= Commodity pool operator =

Business that pools together investments for trading in commodity interests

A Commodity pool operator (CPO) is an individual or organization that solicits or receives funds to use in the operation of a commodity pool, syndicate, collective investment vehicle, investment trust, or similar structure, specifically for trading (buying and selling) of and in commodity interests. Such commodity interests include commodity futures, swaps, options and/or leverage transactions. A commodity pool may refer to organisations or legal structures or vehicles that are used to conduct trading in actual commodities or commodity interests; this can include hedge funds.

A CPO may make trading decisions for its fund, or the fund can be managed by one or more independent commodity trading advisors. The definition of CPO may, in some cases, apply to investment advisors for hedge funds and private funds (including mutual funds and exchange-traded funds).

CPOs are generally regulated by the United States federal government through the Commodity Futures Trading Commission and National Futures Association.

== History ==
In the United States, trading of futures contracts for agricultural commodities dates back to at least the 1850s. In the 1920s, the federal government proposed the first regulation aimed at futures trading and, in 1922, the Grain Futures Act was passed. Following amendments in 1936, this law was replaced by the Commodity Exchange Act. However, it was not until 1974, when the Commodity Futures Trading Commission (CFTC) was established under the Commodity Futures Trading Commission Act, that the "commodity pool operator" was recognized in legislation. At that time the majority of trading was in futures contracts for agricultural commodities, but, as noted by the CFTC, in later years "the futures industry ha[d] become increasingly varied and complex".

In July 2010, the definition of commodity pool operator under the Commodity Exchange Act was expanded by the Dodd-Frank Wall Street Reform and Consumer Protection Act to include "persons operating collective investment vehicles that trade swaps". Prior to this, swaps were not included in the CPO definition.

== Regulation ==
=== Historical regulation ===
Prior to 1974, commodity pool operators were unregulated except for limited requirements to maintain records. In 1979, the CFTC adopted the first comprehensive regulation for commodity pool operators, which was later strengthened by additional rules in 1982 and 1983, increasing the CFTC's oversight of such entities.

The CFTC has authorized the National Futures Association (NFA), which it created in the early-1980s, to carry out processing of registration for certain derivatives industry entities (including CPOs) and to conduct a variety of related regulatory and educational activities.

=== Current regulation and exemptions ===
Under the Commodity Exchange Act, CPOs must register with and conform to the regulations of the CFTC, unless they meet the Commission's criteria for exemption. Additionally, registered CPOs are required to become members of the NFA, which regulates organizations or individuals who conduct futures trading business with public customers. All registered CPOs must follow the CFTC's disclosure requirements and provide the Commission with certain records and reports as required.

Under the CFTC's Rule 4.7, a CPO may be exempt from certain disclosure and reporting requirements if investment in the fund it operates is only open to "qualified eligible persons", including registered commodities and securities professionals and accredited investors. If not all of a CPO's investors are "qualified eligible persons", it may still be exempt from the full disclosure requirements of the CFTC if it engages primarily in securities transactions. Further exemptions from registration include those under CFTC Regulation 4.13 (which states that operators of smaller commodity pools and pools trading at a de minimis level of commodity interests may be exempted, and CFTC Regulation 4.5 (under which certain operators can claim to be excluded based on the definition of "commodity pool operator").

Even if a CPO is exempt from registration, they may still have to follow certain more limited requirements for disclosure and reporting: including that they must provide investors with a fund's offering memorandum, quarterly account statements, and an abbreviated annual report. In addition, the exempt CPO is required to submit a self-executing notice and electronic reports with the NFA. All CPOs are subject to the CFTC's general antifraud authority and general market oversight.

=== Changes following Dodd-Frank ===
On January 26, 2011, following the 2010 enactment of the Dodd-Frank Wall Street Reform and Consumer Protection Act, the CFTC made additions and amendments to the regulation of CPOs. These include two new forms of data collection. The CFTC also introduced requirements for greater reporting of data and amended the requirements for who should register with the CFTC. In particular, and consistent with Dodd-Frank, funds that use (or 'trade') swaps or other commodity interests may be defined as commodity pools, and their operators may be subject to registration with the CFTC, where previously they would not have been. The United States Chamber of Commerce and the Investment Company Institute filed a lawsuit against the CFTC, aiming to overturn these rule changes that effectively required the operators of mutual funds investing in commodities to be registered; however, the lawsuit was unsuccessful and the rule change was upheld by the courts in 2012 and 2013.

== See also ==
- Commodity trading advisor
- Managed futures account
