= Managed futures account =

Type of US investment

A managed futures account (MFA) or managed futures fund (MFF) is a type of alternative investment in the US in which trading in the futures markets is managed by another person or entity, rather than the fund's owner. Managed futures accounts include, but are not limited to, commodity pools. These funds are operated by commodity trading advisors (CTAs) or commodity pool operators (CPOs), who are generally regulated in the United States by the Commodity Futures Trading Commission and the National Futures Association. As of June 2016, the assets under management held by managed futures accounts totaled $340 billion.

== Characteristics ==
Managed futures accounts are operated on behalf of an individual by professional money managers such as CTAs or CPOs, trading in futures or other derivative securities. The funds can take both long and short positions in futures contracts and options on futures contracts in the global commodity, interest rate, equity, and currency markets.

=== Trading strategies ===
Managed futures accounts may be traded using any number of strategies, the most common of which is trend following. Trend following involves buying in markets that are trending higher and selling short in markets that are trending lower. Variations in trend following managers include duration of trend captured (short term, medium term, long term) as well as definition of trend (e.g. what is considered a new high or new low) and the money management/risk management techniques. A theoretical optimal portfolio capturing trends has been derived, and these trends have been widely documented. Other strategies employed by managed futures managers include discretionary strategies, fundamental strategies, option writing, pattern recognition, and arbitrage strategies, among others. However, trend following and variations of trend following are the predominant strategy.

=== Notional funding ===
In many managed futures accounts the dollar amount traded is equal to the amount provided by the investor. However, managed futures also allows investors to leverage their investment with the use of notional funding, which is the difference between the amount provided by the investor (funding level) and the mutually agreed upon amount to be traded (trading level). Notional funding allows an investor to put up only a portion of the minimum investment for a managed futures account, usually 25% to 75% of the minimum. For example, to meet a $200,000 minimum for a CTA that allows 50% notional funding, an investor would only need to provide $100,000 to the CTA. The investment would be traded as if it were $200,000, which would result in double the earnings or losses, as well as double the management fee relative to the actual amount invested. As a result, notional funding can add significant risk to managed futures accounts and investors who wish to use such funding are required to sign disclosures to state that they understand the risk involved.

=== Performance ===
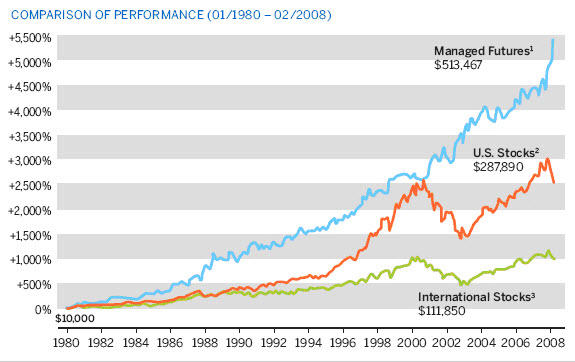
Managed Futures performance history from 1980 to 2008

Managed futures have historically displayed very low correlations to traditional investments, such as stocks and bonds. Following modern portfolio theory, this lack of correlation builds the robustness of the portfolio, reducing portfolio volatility and risk, without significant negative impacts on return. This lack of correlation stems from the fact that markets tend to "trend" the best during more volatile periods, and periods in which markets decline tend to be the most volatile. From 1980 to 2010, the compound average annual return for managed futures was 14.52%, as measured by the CASAM CISDM CTA Equal Weighted Index, while the return for U.S. stocks was 7.04% (based on the S&P 500 total return index). However, managed futures also have high fees. According to data filed with the U.S. Securities and Exchange Commission and compiled by Bloomberg, 89% of the $11.51 billion of gains in 63 managed-futures funds went to fees, commissions and expenses during the decade from Jan. 1, 2003, to Dec. 31, 2012.

== History ==
In the United States, trading of futures contracts for agricultural commodities dates back to at least the 1850s. In the 1920s, the federal government proposed the first regulation aimed at futures trading, and passed the Grain Futures Act in 1922. Following amendments in 1936, this law was replaced by the Commodity Exchange Act. The Commodity Futures Trading Commission (CFTC) was established in 1974, under the Commodity Futures Trading Commission Act. The regulation led to the recognition of a new group of money managers including CTAs. At that time, the funds they operated became known as managed futures. In the late 1970s, the relatively new managed futures funds began to gain acceptance. Although the majority of trading was still in futures contracts for agricultural commodities, exchanges started to introduce futures contracts on other assets, including currencies and bonds. In the 1980s, the futures industry developed significantly following the introduction of non-commodity related futures and by 2004 managed futures had become a $130 billion industry.

== Regulation ==
Managed futures accounts are regulated by the U.S. federal government, through the CTAs and CPOs advising the funds. Most all of these entities are required to register with the Commodity Futures Trading Commission and the National Futures Association and follow their regulations on disclosure and reporting.

The 2010 enactment of the Dodd-Frank Wall Street Reform and Consumer Protection Act led to increased regulation of the managed futures industry. On January 26, 2011, the CFTC made additions and amendments to the regulation of CPOs and CTAs, including two new forms of data collection. The CFTC also introduced regulation to require greater reporting of data and amend its registration requirements. Under the new amended registration requirement, funds that use swaps or other commodity interests may be defined as commodity pools and as such their operators must register with the CFTC, where previously they did not. On 17 April 2012, the United States Chamber of Commerce and the Investment Company Institute filed a lawsuit against the CFTC, aiming to overturn this change to rules that would require the operators of mutual funds investing in commodities to be registered.
