= H.R. 1003 (113th Congress) =

- Long title: To improve consideration by the Commodity Futures Trading Commission of the costs and benefits of its regulations and orders.
- Announced in: the 113th United States Congress
- Sponsored by: Rep. K. Michael Conaway (R, TX-11)
- Number of co-sponsors: 4

Codification
- Acts affected: Commodity Exchange Act
- U.S.C. sections affected: 7 U.S.C. § 19(a),
- Agencies affected: Commodity Futures Trading Commission

Legislative history
- Introduced in the House as H.R. 1003 by Rep. K. Michael Conaway (R, TX-11) on March 6, 2013; Committee consideration by United States House Committee on Agriculture,

H.R. 1003, long title "To improve consideration by the Commodity Futures Trading Commission of the costs and benefits of its regulations and orders" is a bill that was introduced into the United States House of Representatives during the 113th United States Congress. H.R. 1003 would broaden the items for the Commodity Futures Trading Commission (CFTC) to consider when assessing costs and benefits of a proposed regulation. Further, the bill would require the agency to adopt such a regulation only if it determines that the estimated benefits justify the estimated costs.

== Provisions of the bill ==
This summary is based largely on the summary provided by the Congressional Research Service, a public domain source.

H.R. 1003 would amend the Commodity Exchange Act to revise the requirement that the Commodity Futures Trading Commission (CFTC), before promulgating a regulation or issuing an order, consider the costs and benefits of the action. The bill would require the CFTC, through the Office of the Chief Economist, to: (1) assess the costs and benefits, both qualitative and quantitative, of an intended regulation; and (2) propose or adopt a regulation only on a reasoned determination that the benefits justify the costs.

The bill also lists additional mandatory considerations for the CFTC to evaluate in making a reasoned determination of the costs and the benefits, including the impact on market liquidity in the futures and swaps markets, as well as alternatives to direct regulation.

== Congressional Budget Office report ==
H.R. 1003 would broaden the items for the Commodity Futures Trading Commission (CFTC) to consider when assessing costs and benefits of a proposed regulation. Further, the bill would require the agency to adopt such a regulation only if it determines that the estimated benefits justify the estimated costs.

Based on information from the CFTC, the Congressional Budget Office (CBO) estimates that implementing H.R. 1003 would cost $28 million over the 2014-2018 period, assuming appropriation of the necessary amounts. Enacting H.R. 1003 would not affect direct spending or revenues; therefore, pay-as-you-go procedures do not apply.

H.R. 1003 contains no intergovernmental or private-sector mandates as defined in the Unfunded Mandates Reform Act and would not affect the budgets of state, local, or tribal governments.

== Procedural history ==
H.R. 1003 was introduced into the House by Rep. K. Michael Conaway (R, TX-11) on March 6, 2013. It was referred to the United States House Committee on Agriculture, which held hearing about the bill on March 14, 2013. Committee consideration and markup were held on March 20, 2013, when it was ordered to be reported by voice vote. The House Majority Leader Eric Cantor placed the bill on the House Schedule on September 13, 2013 for consideration under a suspension of the rules on September 17.

== Debate and discussion ==
H.R. 1003 was supported by several trad organizations including the Agricultural Retailers Association, the Business Roundtable, the National Association of Corporate Treasurers, the National Association of Manufacturers, and the U.S. Chamber of Commerce. Together they wrote a joint letter in support of the bill arguing that they support "the strong policy imperative for transparent economic analysis as part of the rulemaking process, even for independent regulators, and this legislation will ensure the CFTC balances the costs with the benefits before issuing rulemakings and orders."

According to Paul Schott Stevens, the president and CEO of the Investment Company Institute (ICI), Rep. Conaway sponsored H.R. 1003 in reaction to "significant criticism" of the CFTC's inadequate cost-benefit analysis. This criticism was leveled both by Congress and by the CFTC's own commissioners. According to Stevens, "given the significantly increased volume of rulemaking by the CFTC in recent years, we agree it is critical that the agency be required to conduct a thorough and thoughtful analysis of the costs and benefits of its proposed regulations."

Proponents of the bill argued that it would improve the quality of the rules passed by the CFTC by forcing the CFTC to do more through cost benefit analyses.

Opponents of the bill feared it would make it easier for industry groups to challenge the rules made by the CFTC in court. They also expressed concern that the costs of such rules are often easier to quantify than the proposed benefits, which could lead to costs being overestimated.

== See also ==
- List of bills in the 113th United States Congress
- Commodity Futures Trading Commission
- Commodity Exchange Act
