= Round turn (finance) =

A round turn is a commonly used term in futures trading, managed futures accounts, and forex to represent a single completed trade (both a buy and a sell), as opposed to a side which is half of the full trade – either the buy or the sell.

== Definition ==
As defined by the National Futures Association, a round turn is:

"intended to include all transactions where an actual futures position is closed out or offset. This would include futures positions closed out by delivery, cash settlement, through an exchange for physicals, and as a result of the transfer to the carrying FCM from another FCM of offsetting futures contracts."

Round turns are often tracked to know how many round tables occur in a year for (Commodity Trading Advisors).

=== Round turns per million ===
Unlike mutual funds which report turnover, managed futures have the concept of round turns per million. Round turn per million measures how many ‘round turns’ are done per 1 million invested in a managed futures program.
