= List of United States Supreme Court opinions involving commodity and futures regulation =

This is a chronological list of significant Supreme Court of the United States cases in the area of commodity and futures regulation.

- Ware & Leland v. Mobile County, 209 U.S. 405, 28 Sup. Ct. 526, 14 Ann. Cas. 1031 (1908). Contracts for the sales of cotton for future delivery which do not oblige interstate shipments are not subjects of interstate commerce, and that a state tax on persons engaged in buying and selling cotton for future delivery was held not to be a regulation of interstate commerce or beyond the power of the state.
- Hill v. Wallace, 259 U.S. 44 (1922)
- Board of Trade of City of Chicago v. Olsen, 262 U.S. 1 (1923)
- Trusler v. Crooks, 269 U.S. 475 (1926)
- Wallace v. Cutten, 298 U.S. 229 (1936)
- Commodity Futures Trading Commission v. Schor, 478 U.S. 833 (1986)
