= David Harding (financier) =

British businessman (born 1961)

Sir David Harding
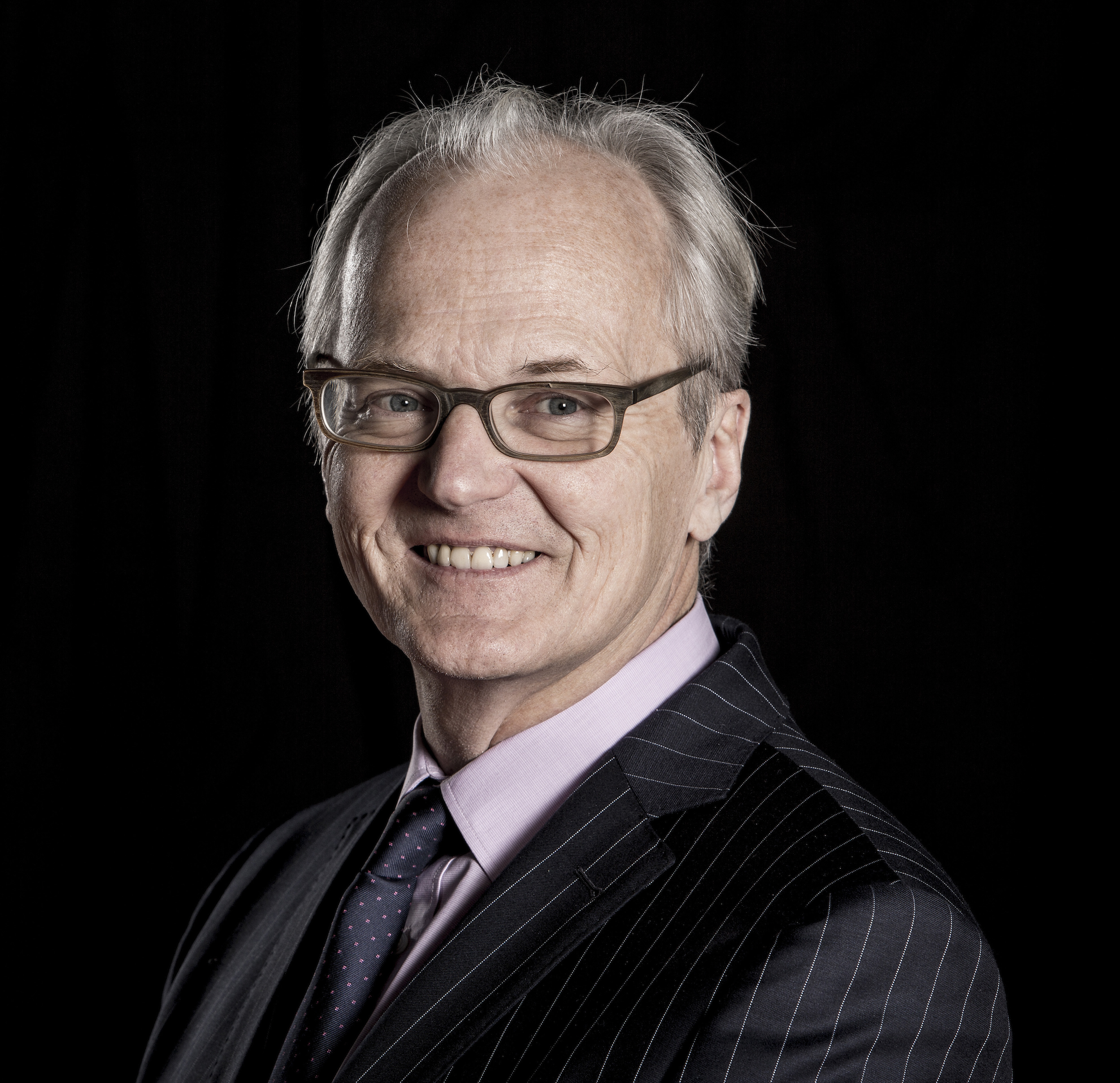
- Born: David Winton Harding; 24 August 1961 (age 65); Oxford, England
- Education: Pangbourne College; University of Cambridge; St Catharine's College, Cambridge
- Occupation: Investment management
- Years active: 1982–present
- Known for: Founder of Winton Group

Sir David Winton Harding (born 24 August 1961) is a British billionaire businessman, and the founder and CEO of Winton Group. He had previously co-founded Man AHL (formerly Adam, Harding & Lueck). His approach favours quantitative investment strategies, using scientific research as the basis of trading decisions.

Harding is also known for his philanthropy, which includes a £100m donation to the University of Cambridge, the second-largest ever donation by a British citizen to a university. Harding has also endowed the Winton Professor of the Public Understanding of Risk in the Statistical Laboratory at Faculty of Mathematics, University of Cambridge, and established the Harding Center for Risk Literacy at the Max Planck Institute for Human Development.

With respect to scientific research, he has established a research programme into the physics of sustainability at Cambridge University's Cavendish Laboratory. Politically, Harding has served as the joint-treasurer of Britain Stronger in Europe and chairman of the BSIE finance committee.

== Education and early career ==
David Winton Harding was born on 24 August 1961, the youngest of four children, and raised in Goring-on-Thames, Oxfordshire. He attended Pangbourne College, Berkshire and was educated at the University of Cambridge where he attended St. Catharine's College. At Cambridge, Harding studied natural sciences and in 1982 he graduated from his BA with first class honours. Later that year he began a traineeship at Wood Mackenzie, a stockbroker. After two years, he joined the futures brokerage firm, Johnson Matthey & Wallace, as a trader in commodity futures.

== Investment management ==
In 1985, Harding became a futures trader at Sabre Fund Management, one of the first commodity trading advisors (CTAs) in the United Kingdom. He drew on his scientific background to design trading programs for futures markets. He remained with the firm for two years, until founding Adam, Harding & Lueck (AHL) in 1987 with Michael Adam and Martin Lueck.

The firm created AHL as a quantitatively focused CTA. In 1989, ED & F Man (which later became the Man Group) purchased a 51 percent stake in the firm. When Man bought the whole firm in 1994, Harding became head of Man Quantitative Research. In 1996, he left to set up his own firm. According to Barron's, Harding had left Man after becoming frustrated by lack of focus on research and the bureaucracy of working in a large firm.

=== Winton Group ===
Harding founded Winton, an investment management firm, in 1997. It was named after his middle name and his father's first name. According to Hedge Fund Review magazine, his aim was to demonstrate that a business can be successful based on empirical scientific research, rather than relying on marketing. Harding recruited scientists to the firm to create a strong research environment and to use quantitative, statistical research of market data to inform his trading decisions.

The fund had been launched in 1997 with $1.6 million in assets; as of 2013, the fund had returned on average 15% net per year. As of February 2016, Winton had over $30 billion in assets under management.

Harding has been described by industry commentators as "one of the pioneers of the hedge fund industry". He has been ranked among the top 50 hedge fund managers worldwide by Alpha magazine, which added him to their "Hedge Fund Hall of Fame", and he was listed at 95 on the Sunday Times Rich List 2016.

In September 2012, Harding was named at the top of a list of Britain's biggest taxpayers. Within 6 days, Harding revealed that "he was paying £34 million in tax on his £87m income."

In 2012 he became the firm's majority owner. Harding had previously served as Winton's president and executive chairman. In 2015 he became CEO.

In April 2016, his net worth was estimated to be £1.1bn.

== Philanthropy ==
Harding has made major donations to educational and research institutions through his Winton Charitable Foundation. The foundation funded a professorship at the Statistical Laboratory of the University of Cambridge, the Winton Professorship of the Public Understanding of Risk, aimed at increasing understanding of the mathematics of risk for individuals and organisations. Harding is also the patron of the Harding Center for Risk Literacy at the Max Planck Institute for Human Development in Berlin, which opened in 2009.

Harding's foundation, the David and Claudia Harding Foundation, has pledged £20 million to the University of Cambridge's Cavendish Laboratory to establish The Winton Programme for the Physics of Sustainability, an advanced research programme to apply theoretical physics to issues of the sustainability of natural resources. The donation to the Cavendish is the largest since the famous laboratory was established in 1874. Harding is one of the administrators of the Winton Fund for the Physics of Sustainability, which manages the programme's funding.

In 2011, Winton began a five-year sponsorship of the Royal Society Prizes for Science Books which was rechristened the Royal Society Winton Prize for Science Books. Harding's foundation has also committed £5m to the Francis Crick Institute in London for cancer research. In 2014, it provided a £5 million donation to the Science Museum in London, the largest single donation in the museum's history, to build a gallery of mathematics.

In 2019 Harding donated £100m to Cambridge University, the largest donation by a British citizen to any university. The funds will go towards supporting the Harding Scholars, a distinguished postgraduate scholarship system for more than 100 PhD students, similar to the Rhodes Scholarship and the Gates Cambridge Scholarship. Additional funding will be used to attract students from under-represented groups, allowing Cambridge to recruit the best and brightest students regardless of their social situation. Harding's £100m benefaction was a landmark donation for UK fundraising efforts and closely followed other major donations by leading US entrepreneurs including Michael Bloomberg, Stephen Schwarzman, and Jaffray Woodriff.

Harding was knighted in the 2022 New Year Honours for services to philanthropy. The Labour Party suggested it was a consequence of his Conservative Party donations.

== Political activity ==
In November 2015, he was announced as joint-treasurer of Britain Stronger in Europe and chairman of the finance committee. In May 2016, it was announced that Harding had donated £3.5 million to the campaign.

Harding is a Conservative Party donor. He donated almost £1 million to the party whilst David Cameron was in power and during the 2019 general election donated £200,000 to the party, stating in an interview that he would consider leaving the country if a Labour government targeted hedge fund companies and increased taxes.

== Personal life ==
Harding has five children and is married to Claudia Harding.
