= Peregrine Financial Group =

American futures brokerage firm

Peregrine Financial Group Inc., commonly known as PFGBest, was an Iowa-based financial firm that operated for over 20 years. It was shut down in July 2012 after it was put under investigation for a $200 million shortfall in customer funds. Peregrine’s chief executive, Russell R. Wasendorf Sr., was arrested and charged with making false statements to the Commodity Futures Trading Commission (CFTC).

The firm filed for bankruptcy on July 10, while listing more than $500 million in assets and over $100 million in liabilities.

== History ==
Peregrine Financial Group was a futures commission merchant and commodities brokerage firm. The firm grew out of founder Russell R. Wasendorf Sr.'s advisory firm, Wasendorf & Son and became Peregrine Financial Group (PFG) in 1990, as Wasendorf started to move his business from Cedar Falls to Chicago. He chose to name his firm after the peregrine falcon, telling the Chicago Sun-Times: "It's the world's fastest predator. It's kind of related in some degree to profiting in the futures market, where you have to act quickly." He incorporated PFG as a futures commission merchant (FCM) in 1992, allowing the firm to earn interest on customer accounts.

In 1998, PFG began developing an online trading platform along with Jerome Bressert. The system was known as BEST for Bressert Electronic Systems Trading and the online trading division of the firm was known as PFGBest. Bressert was forced out of the firm in 2001, leaving his online trading technology with PFG.

Early in its history, the firm faced financial problems. To avoid losing the firm, Wasendorf began to dip into the firm's customer segregated funds to cover certain losses.

In 2007, PFG launched "PFG Best Direct FX Express", an electronic platform for trading forex currencies. That same year, Wasendorf received approval to begin construction of a new $10 million headquarters for PFG in Cedar Falls, Iowa, bringing 70 jobs to Iowa from the firm's Chicago office.

== Embezzlement of customer funds ==
Wasendorf attempted to commit suicide before his arrest and wrote in a confession letter that he had been "using a scheme of false bank statements to embezzle millions of dollars from customer accounts over a period of about 20 years." Congressional hearings questioned why the CFTC had not caught the embezzlement earlier and "the agency’s failure to adequately oversee the National Futures Association, the self-regulatory organization directly responsible for overseeing Peregrine." The firm had been moved by Wasendorf from Chicago in 2009 to a new 18 million dollar building in Cedar Falls, Iowa.

In August 2012, Wasendorf was indicted on "31 counts of lying to regulators.... [He] ... could face up to 155 years in prison and a $7.8 million fine. [He] allegedly stole as much as $215 million from customers over a 20-year period." He pleaded guilty to all charges, and in January 2013 federal judge Linda Reade sentenced him to 50 years of prison.

=== Litigation ===
The CFTC filed a criminal complaint in Cedar Rapids against the Cedar Falls firm Peregrine Financial Group, Inc., and Russell R. Wasendorf, Sr.

Wasendorf was also sued on July 13 by Michael LaSalvia of Naperville, Illinois, who sought class action status for his suit against the CEO and his son. LaSilvia also alleged that Wasendorf had mixed client and firm money. Another client separately sued Wasendorf as well as other company executives in Chicago.

=== Liquidation ===
Michael Eidelman, the receiver for Wasendorf in the bankruptcy of PFGBest, is tracking assets which may be linked to Wasendorf's corporate actions including a $100,000 personal wine collection, a high-end Italian restaurant in Cedar Falls, a jet, and two residences with $1 million estimated value.

The bankruptcy filing specified between 10,000 and 25,000 creditors. The trustee for the firm, Ira Bodenstein, started with the court by identifying 11 clients, primarily owners of warehouse receipts for precious metals, of about 24,000 futures customers with specifically identifiable property eligible to be returned to them.

=== Recovery of Customer Funds ===
As of December 2014, customers were in line to recover 44% of funds held at the firm.

=== Media Coverage ===
Peregrine Financial Group CEO's attempted suicide and his confession to a massive fraud was covered as a documentary on CNBC's American Greed show as Episode 87 under the title "The Falcon & the Con Man"

== Bibliography ==
- Benoit, David (2012-07-10). "PFGBest: The Corporate History". Wall Street Journal. ISSN 0099-9660.
- Berman, Jillian; Gongloff, Mark; Levine, D.M. (2012-07-11). "Russell Wasendorf Sr., Peregrine CEO, Shaped Company And Town In His Image". HuffPost. Archived from the original on 2024-01-28.
- Levine, D. M. (2012-07-16). "Former PFG Employee 'Was Waiting For Something Like That To Happen'". HuffPost.
- "Peregrine founder built empire on lie concealed in a postal box". The Cedar Rapids Gazette. 2012-09-25.
