= Russell Wasendorf =

American fraudster and financier

Russell Wasendorf, Sr.
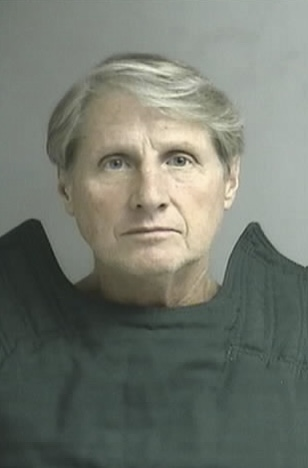
- Booking photo of Wasendorf in 2012, wearing an anti-suicide vest
- Born: 1948 (age 77–78)
- Occupation: Former chief executive of Peregrine Financial Group
- Status: In prison
- Criminal charges: Mail fraud, Embezzlement, Making false statements to the Commodity Futures Trading Commission, Making false statements to a futures association registered under the Commodity Exchange Act
- Penalty: Sentenced to 50 years

Russell Ralph Wasendorf Sr. (born 1948) is the former chairman and chief executive officer of Peregrine Financial Group, also known as PFGBEST, a futures commission merchant (commonly known as a commodity broker) that filed for bankruptcy protection in Chicago in July 2012.

He was arrested in July 2012 following a suicide attempt. In September 2012 he pleaded guilty to embezzling $215.5 million from more than 13,000 customers over the course of 20 years, among other charges. On January 31, 2013, he received a 50-year sentence for fraud.

== Early life ==
Russell Ralph Wasendorf was born in 1948 to Arthur and Ida Wasendorf.

Arthur Wasendorf was born April 18, 1903 in Elma, Iowa. He married Ida Wheeler in 1931. Arthur worked as a meat packer. Russell Ralph was named after a pastor and son who had offered the Wasendorf's a place to stay when money was tight. Arthur died in 1954, when Russ was in kindergarten. Ida later went to work for a local securities broker.

Wasendorf attended high school in Marion, Iowa, and then college at University of Northern Iowa. He graduated from UNI in 1970.

While still a student at UNI, he married Susan Richardson. They had one son, Russell Jr., and divorced soon after. He remarried in 1976 to Connie Brandhorst.

== Career ==
In 1974, while working for the American Soybean Association, he produced a 20-minute documentary on soybeans titled "The Gold That Grows". He later began working on promotional videos and trader-education programs for futures industry newsman Merrill Oster.

Wasendorf established Wasendorf & Son Inc. in 1980 as a rival commodity futures advisory firm to Oster. It was rumored that he took Oster's client list with him. He started the business in the back room of a Cedar Falls, Iowa barber shop. In 1985, he added an introducing broker, Dana Futures.

Wasendorf & Son would eventually become Peregrine Financial Group (PFG) in 1990, as Wasendorf started to move his business from Cedar Falls to Chicago. He chose to name his firm after the peregrine falcon, telling the Chicago Sun-Times: "It's the world's fastest predator. It's kind of related in some degree to profiting in the futures market, where you have to act quickly." He incorporated PFG as a futures commission merchant (FCM) in 1992, allowing the firm to earn interest on customer accounts.

In 1998, PFG began developing an online trading platform along with Jerome Bressert. The system was known as BEST for Bressert Electronic Systems Trading and the online trading division of the firm was known as PFGBest. Bressert was forced out of the firm in 2001, leaving his online trading technology with PFG.

In 2005, Wasendorf contributed $250,000 to Ronald Gidwitz's gubernatorial campaign, suggesting that he thought "he'd make a heck of a governor".

In 2007, Wasendorf received approval to begin construction of a new $10 million headquarters for PFG in Cedar Falls, Iowa, bringing 70 jobs to Iowa from the firm's Chicago office.

Wasendorf is the author or co-author of six books about trading and futures, has been an investor in the BESTDirect Online Trading platform, and in 2001 founded SFO (Stocks, Futures, Options), an industry magazine that ceased publication in 2012.

Wasendorf has engaged in charity work and won a number of awards for contributions to the community. In 2009, he pledged $2 million to University of Northern Iowa's athletic department, the school's largest donation to date.

== PFG collapse ==
On July 9, 2012, the same day that the National Futures Association reported that PFG appeared to be missing at least $200 million in customer funds, Wasendorf attempted to commit suicide by asphyxiation outside company headquarters. Before doing so he left a suicide note admitting to embezzling from the company for nearly two decades. "I have committed fraud. For this I feel constant and intense guilt," he wrote in the note, according to the affidavit.

The bankruptcy filing took place after PFG was put under investigation for a shortfall of at least $200 million in customer funds. The firm was also accused by federal regulators of commingling customer and firm money.

Wasendorf was arrested and charged with making false statements to the Commodity Futures Trading Commission (CFTC). He admitted to stealing at least $100 million from his firm, according to an FBI affidavit that accompanied the criminal complaint unsealed on July 13, 2012, the date of his arrest. On September 17, 2012, Wasendorf pleaded guilty to one count each of mail fraud, embezzlement, making false statements to the Commodity Futures Trading Commission, and making false statements to a futures association registered under the Commodity Exchange Act. In January 2013, federal judge Linda Reade sentenced him to 50 years of imprisonment in a federal penitentiary and to pay $215.5 million in restitution, though she noted that PFG's customers will probably never be made whole.

The fall of PFG was featured in the CNBC series American Greed episode "The Falcon & the Con Man".

== Other businesses ==
Wasendorf was an investor in the Chicago restaurant Harvest on Huron, where Allen Sternweiler was the executive chef. According to the company's website, featured a 400 bottle wine list. Harvest would eventually be retooled as Allen's New American Cafe, in which Wasendorf was the primary investor.

As Wasendorf moved his primary business interests away from Chicago, he opened a new restaurant in Cedar Falls called MyVerona. According to the website for the restaurant, Jordan Barkow began working directly with Sternweiler before being promoted to executive chef. Wasendorf used a recording of 1970s rock band The Knack's smash hit "My Sharona" in the restaurant's advertising, having the chorus modified to "M-M-M-My Verona". On July 27, 2012, attorneys for the band sent a cease and desist letter to Wasendorf and the restaurant. In 2013, the MyVerona building was sold to Tony Tomlyanovich, the owner of Tony's LaPizzeria in Cedar Falls, for $850,000.

== Bibliography ==
- Benoit, David (2012-07-10). "PFGBest: The Corporate History". Wall Street Journal. ISSN 0099-9660.
- Berman, Jillian; Gongloff, Mark; Levine, D.M. (2012-07-11). "Russell Wasendorf Sr., Peregrine CEO, Shaped Company And Town In His Image". HuffPost. Archived from the original on 2024-01-28.
- Levine, D. M. (2012-07-16). "Former PFG Employee 'Was Waiting For Something Like That To Happen'". HuffPost.
- "Peregrine founder built empire on lie concealed in a postal box". The Cedar Rapids Gazette. 2012-09-25.
