= Foreign Exchange Dealers Coalition =

Foreign exchange market industry organization

The Foreign Exchange Dealers Coalition (FXDC) was an alliance of the largest U.S. foreign exchange market dealers, that appears to have closed sometime after 2010. The FXDC partnership was formed in the fall of 2007 to pool industry resources to demonstrate the viability of the forex industry and to ensure fair regulation and oversight that does not hamper freedom of choice, innovation or job creation. The Coalition aimed to provide input to the proposals for major regulation changes at the time, including the required registration for Retail Foreign Exchange Dealers (RFEDs) with the National Futures Association.

== History ==
The FXDC defined a forex dealer as providing online trading services to allow individuals to speculate on rapidly changing foreign exchange rates. Forex Dealer Members (FDMs) are regulated in the United States by the Commodity Futures Trading Commission (CFTC) and National Futures Association (NFA), as well as by national and local regulatory bodies where they conduct business.

The forex industry in the United States was unregulated until December 2000 when the Commodity Futures Modernization Act of 2000 was introduced. After its introduction forex firms had to be members of the CFTC and the self-regulating National Futures Association (NFA), operating under the same guidelines set forth for FCMs in the futures brokerage business. On a regular basis, all forex dealers submitted financial reports to its regulators and were subject to lengthy regulatory audits covering everything from marketing practices to employee training regimens. In addition, many of these long-established regulatory bodies extend specific regulations solely to retail forex dealers, such as higher capital requirements, disclosure statements and the requirement that all dealers disclose to customers that their funds may not be safe in the event of bankruptcy.

The FXDC partnership was formed in the fall of 2007 by a group of the nine largest forex firms in the US at that time, and seems to have been dissolved sometime after 2010.
