= Charles J. Gradante =

Italian-American businessman

- Born: July 30, 1945 (age 81); New York, New York
- Education: LIU C.W. Post, MS in Management, BS in Engineering
- Occupation: Hedge Fund Co-Founder
- Employer: Hennessee Hedge Fund LLC
- Known for: Hedge Fund Pioneer
- Spouse: Elizabeth "Lee" Hennessee-Gradante

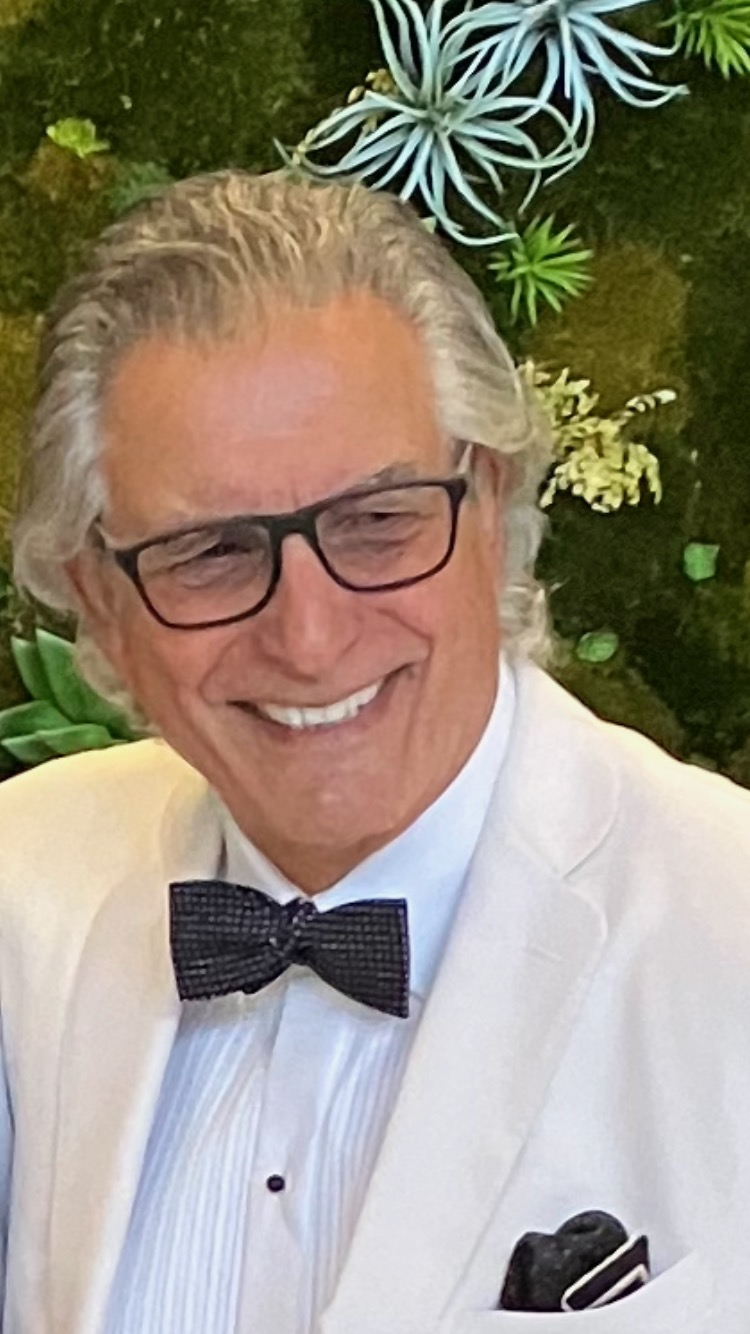
Charles Gradante - Financial Times

Charles J. Gradante (born July 30, 1945) is an Italian-American businessman in the hedge fund industry, appearing on television and before the United States Congress in that role. Sovereign Wealth Fund Institute's PensionDaily.com called Gradante "one of Wall Street's most sought after opinion leaders" for financial and economic areas. Gradante is known as one of the first hedge fund industry executives to spark a legendary debate about the risk of hedge funds growing too large rather than focusing on finding investments where they have a competitive edge; he most recently discussed the issue at a conference hosted by The Palm Beach Hedge Fund Association that was covered by Yahoo Finance and CorpGov.

== Early life and education ==
Gradante was born on July 30, 1945, to Sebastian "Buster" Gradante and Emmauela "Mildred" née Prestigiacomo in the Greenwich Village section of New York City. His father was the founder and CEO of the RCB Transportation Company in New York. Charles graduated from Lindenhurst Senior High School in 1963 with All County and All League honors in football. Gradante received an athletic scholarship for football and baseball at LIU-C.W. Post and played 4 years of varsity baseball. Afterwards, Gradante graduated from LIU C.W. Post where he earned a B.S. in engineering sciences in 1967 and a M.S. in management engineering in 1970. Gradante first became employed by Grumman Aeronautical Engineering Corp. in Bethpage, New York, where he joined a group of engineers building the first lunar landing module. He would then join Pan American World Airways Space Shuttle Design Team.

== Business career ==
In 1971, Gradante pivoted away from engineering and into the financial services industry by joining John Diebold Venture Capital Corporation to advise IBM Corporation on acquisitions in the computer industry. Gradante moved on to Citibank from 1976 to 1986, where he rose to the rank of vice president. In 1986, Gradante left Citibank and became the assistant to the chairman of Drexel Burnham Lambert Ltd. in London, responsible for trading and sales. On October 10, 1990, Gradante became president and CEO of failing Union Chelsea National Bank where he engineered a turnaround and remained until 1995.

== Hennessee Group LLC ==
In 1995, Gradante became the co-director at the Hennessee Hedge Fund Advisory Group which was formed by Elizabeth "Lee" Hennessee-Gradante as a division of E. F. Hutton in 1987. In 1995, with a team of four people and $200 million in assets under advisory, Gradante negotiated the acquisition of Hennessee Hedge Fund Advisory Group by Weiss, Peck & Greer. Since its start in 1987, the Hennessee Hedge Fund Advisory Group provided hedge fund investment research as well as hedge fund performance indexes that have been cited by institutions, hedge fund managers and investors. Additionally, the group published the Hennessee Hedge Fund Review since 1993, which provided monthly outlooks into hedge fund performance and the markets.

In 1997, Gradante and his wife, Elizabeth "Lee" Hennessee-Gradante, took the firm private and co-founded the Hennessee Group LLC. At its peak, this long-short equity hedge fund managed more than $1.6 billion of assets. In December 2012, Hennessee Group LLC sold its hedge fund division to Terrapin Asset Management. However, the group maintained ownership of the Hennessee Hedge Fund Indexes as well as other research services. In 2007, Gradante predicted the looming CDS-CDO home mortgage crisis. The group's research has been frequently quoted in The Wall Street Journal, Barron’s, The New York Times, Forbes, and The Financial Times.

== Bayou Hedge Fund Fraud ==
In July 2005, the Bayou hedge fund fraud unraveled and was reported to the Securities and Exchange Commission. One such client, South Cherry LLC, sued the Hennessee Group alleging that the Bayou fraud could have been and should have been discovered by Hennessee's due diligence process. The lawsuit against Hennessee Group and Gradante was subsequently dismissed in July 2007 by U.S. District Court Judge Colleen McMahon who wrote: "that since Bayou's principals had deceived the entire investment community for over nine years, it was doubtful that Hennessee's due diligence would have uncovered the fraud". The dismissal was upheld on appeal in July 2009.

In the aftermath of the Bernard Madoff hedge fund fraud in December 2008, the Bayou fraud was revisited by the Securities and Exchange Commission and Hennessee Group LLC and Charles Gradante settled similar charges of alleged due diligence failures. Neither Hennessee group LLC nor Gradante admitted any wrongdoing in April 2009.

== SandDollar Capital ==
In 2007, Gradante and his wife co-founded SandDollar Capital LLC, a private equity firm. On July 31, 2007, SandDollar Capital LLC formed an alliance with Barbarian Films LLC. Some of the films created through this alliance include 13, Spread, The Greatest, and Powder Blue.

== 1998 Long-Term Capital Management Downturn ==
In 1998, Charles Gradante was invited by the House of Representatives to explain the collapse of the Long-Term Capital Management hedge fund. In his testimony. Gradante received notoriety in pointing out that "hedging is not inherently bad for markets; the farmer was the first hedger and as such hedge funds use similar strategies". He further pointed out that after the Russian economic crisis of 1998, LTCM developed a flawed, fat-tail risk strategy. Secondly, banks and brokers lent too much capital to LTCM without properly conducting due diligence. Gradante believes that the New York Federal Reserve Bank acted swiftly and brilliantly in avoiding potential systemic risks. He points out that merger arbitrage was negatively affected by LTCM as spreads narrowed and then widened. After the LTCM downturn, Gradante lobbied for increased transparency in the hedge fund industry on national television and in front of Congress. Gradante also advocated for a shorter settlement period, which ultimately came into effect with the adoption of "T+1" settlement in 2024.

== GameStop Debacle ==
In the wake of the GameStop short squeeze of 2021, Gradante spoke at a CorpGov event in Palm Beach where he discussed the standoff between retail investors and hedge funds and the resulting strain put on Robinhood, other large broker dealers and market makers. He appeared at subsequent events with The Palm Beach Hedge Fund Association to discuss inappropriate hedge fund risk management, excessive use of naked shorts and synthetic shorts, the need for regulatory changes with respect to borrowing costs and margin requirements on heavily-shorted stocks. Gradante's videos on the GameStop debacle, where he sided with retail investors, were viewed globally hundreds of thousands of times across various platforms. He further argued the case to use blockchain technology to address multi-day settlement risk: "More broadly, same-day settlement - possibly through the use of blockchain - could eliminate many of the risks associated with real-time trading and multi-day settlements," according to an interview with CorpGov.

== Advisory role ==
Gradante is one of Wall Street's most sought-after experts on matters of the stock market, the global economy, hedge fund strategy, and asset allocation. He has testified before the United States House of Representatives as a hedge fund industry expert discussing the systemic risk in the wake of long-term capital management. He also participated in a U.S. Securities and Exchange Commission Roundtable on hedge funds and a CFTC Roundtable on CPO and Commodity Pool Industry Issues. Furthermore, the Senate Banking Committee also sought Gradante's opinion on the issue of hedge fund regulations, the role of hedge funds in providing liquidity to markets, and potential systemic risks associated with hedge funds. Gradante was one of the few investment advisors to predict the stock market crash of 2008–2009.

Gradante has co-hosted and made guest appearances on Bloomberg Television, Fox News, CNN Financial News and CNBC's Squawk Box and Street Signs.

Gradante contributed to the book, Expert Financial Planning: Investment Strategies from Industry Leaders and Investors Guide to Hedge Funds.

From 2002 to 2005, Gradante was a member of the board of trustees of Regent University.

In 2009, Gradante pioneered new ways to monitor the hedge fund systematic risk to the capital markets and hedge fund fraud surveillance, especially the "Gradante Gatekeeper Control Concept".

== Awards and honors ==
On May 8, 2005, Gradante was honored with the Distinguished Alumni Award from the C.W. Post Campus of Long Island University.

On May 26, 2015, Gradante was inducted into the Lindenhurst Senior High School Hall of Fame.

== Personal life ==
Gradante met Elizabeth Lee Hennessee in December 1991, and they married on October 31, 1992, at the St. Bartholomew's Episcopal Church in New York. Gradante has three children and two grandchildren. He currently resides in Florida and New York. His wife died on October 29, 2016. Her mother Mary Francis Dillon of Raleigh, NC was a member of Colonial Dames and Daughters of the American Revolution. At the time of her death, both organizations were in the final phase of her admittance. Since 1992, Gradante has acted as trustee to the DP Foundation, a 501(c)(3) nonprofit, while also serving on the boards of the Palm Beach Hedge Fund Association and CorpGov. Gradante is a published poet and amateur abstract artist. In April 2025 Gradante published 154 of his poems in the book "Love Tango" released on Amazon. He is a patron of The Palm Beach Opera, The Palm Beach Symphony, The Norton Museum, Palm Beach Jazz, and Arts Garage.
