= Gradante =

Gradante is a surname. Notable people with the surname include:

- Anna-Maria Gradante (born 1976), German judoka
- Charles J. Gradante (born 1945), American businessman
