= Future Trading Act =

United States federal law

Futures Trading Act
- Other short titles: Futures Trading Act of 1921
- Long title: An Act taxing contracts for the sale of grain for future delivery, and options for such contracts, and providing for the regulation of boards of trade, and for other purposes.
- Enacted by: the 67th United States Congress
- Effective: August 24, 1921

Citations
- Public law: Pub. L. 67–66
- Statutes at Large: 42 Stat. 187

Codification
- Titles amended: 7 U.S.C.: Agriculture
- U.S.C. sections amended: 7 U.S.C. ch. 1 § 1

Legislative history
- Introduced in the House as H.R. 5676 by Jasper N. Tincher (R-KS) on May 3, 1921; Committee consideration by House Agriculture Committee; Passed the House on May 13, 1921 (269-69); Reported by the joint conference committee on August 23, 1921; agreed to by the House on August 23, 1921 (341-9) and by the Senate on August 23, 1921 (passed); Signed into law by President Warren G. Harding on August 24, 1921

United States Supreme Court cases
- Hill v. Wallace, 259 U.S. 44 (1922); Trusler v. Crooks, 269 U.S. 475 (1926)

The Future Trading Act of 1921 (Pub. L. 67–66, 42 Stat. 187) was a United States Act of Congress, approved on August 24, 1921, by the 67th United States Congress intended to institute regulation of grain futures contracts and, particularly, the exchanges on which they were traded. It was the second federal statute that attempted to regulate futures contracts after the short lived Anti-Gold Futures Act of 1864.

The act imposed a tax of 20 cents a bushel on all contracts for the sale of grain for future delivery other than those on exchanges regulated by the U.S. Department of Agriculture that met standards set out in the statute. Twenty cents a bushel was considered a large sum by the standards of the day.

The Act was held to be unconstitutional by the U.S. Supreme Court in Hill v. Wallace on May 15, 1922. About four years later, on January 11, 1926, the Court announced a related decision in Trusler v. Crooks.

The Grain Futures Act of 1922 was ruled constitutional in Board of Trade of City of Chicago v. Olsen.
