= Short-term trading =

Short-term trading refers to those trading strategies in stock market or futures market in which the time duration between entry and exit is within a range of few days to few weeks.

There are two main schools of thought: swing trading and trend following. Day trading is an extremely short-term style of trading in which all positions entered during a trading day are exited the same day.

Short term trading can be risky and unpredictable due to the volatile nature of the stock market at times. Within the time frame of a day and a week many factors can have a major effect on a stock's price. Company news, reports, and consumer’s attitudes can all have a positive or negative effect on the stock going up or down. According to Zweig (2006), "In an article in a women's magazine many years ago we advised the readers to buy their stocks as they bought their groceries, not as they bought their perfume" (p. 8). This means doing the research to spot the best opportunities and leaving the emotion and outside appeal out of the decision to buy or sell. Simply watching the news or reading financial statements will not prepare one to have success in the short term. By the time news comes out the markets have already responded and most of the potential gains for investors are gone. Buying or selling a stock that does not have much volume can move it up or down. Small investors have little effect but large mutual funds and hedge funds can determine the minute-to-minute pricing of stocks through supply and demand (Cramer, 2005, p. 96).

Watching whether a stock is trending up or down can be a sign as to sell or buy in the short run. This is called the moving average or the average price of a stock over a specific period of time. As a stock is trending upward throughout a day or two it could be an opportunity for gains and as a stock trends downward it could be a great opportunity to short the stock. Many analysts use chart patterns in an attempt to forecast the market. Formulas and market theories have been developed to conquer short term trading. According to Masteika and Rutkauskas (2012), when viewing a stock's chart pattern over a few days, the investor should buy shortly after the highest chart bar and then place a trailing stop order which lets profits run and cuts losses in response to market price changes (p. 917–918). Historically, on average the stock markets lowest weekday is Mondays which offers a potential sale on any given stock (Lynch, 2000). Along with that, since 1950 most of the stock market's gains have occurred from November to April. Investors can use these known trends and averages to their advantage when trading.

Due to the risk of short-term trading, small investors are often advised to limit short term trading and lean more towards value investing or buying and holding a position for the long term. According to Israelov and Katz (2011, p. 34), "Our suggestion (for long term investors) is to use short-term information for trade modification." This strategy has the value investor reviewing his stocks balance sheets, market signals, and charts every couple months in order to buy more or sell.
