= Wallace v. Cutten =

- Supreme Court of the United States

Argued April 27, 1936 Decided May 18, 1936
- Full case name: Wallace, et al. v. Arthur W. Cutten
- Citations: 298 U.S. 229 (more) 56 S. Ct. 753; 80 L. Ed. 1157; 1936 U.S. LEXIS 710

Holding
- Authority under section 6(b) of the Grain Future Act is limited to suspending a trader who was currently violating provisions Act, not to punishing violations that occurred in the past.

Court membership
- Chief Justice Charles E. Hughes Associate Justices Willis Van Devanter · James C. McReynolds; Louis Brandeis · George Sutherland; Pierce Butler · Harlan F. Stone; Owen Roberts · Benjamin N. Cardozo

Case opinion
- Majority: Brandeis, joined by unanimous

Laws applied
- Grain Futures Act

Wallace v. Cutten, 298 U.S. 229 (1936), was a case in which the Supreme Court of the United States held that the authority of the United States Secretary of Agriculture under the Grain Futures Act was limited to prevent continued violation of the act, not past violations.

== Background ==
The Secretary of Agriculture served a complaint upon the Respondent, Arthur W. Cutten on April 11, 1934 alleging that Cutten had not reported his net position in futures that he controlled to the Grain Futures Administration when he had commitments in excess of 500,000 bushels. The complaint also alleged that he conspired with other grain firms to hide his net position from the Grain Futures Administration, and he reported false information to the Administration.

Cutten was barred from trade for two years after a hearing before a commission composed of the Secretary of Agriculture, Attorney General, and Secretary of Commerce. Cutten successfully appealed his claim that the sanctions could not be applied to behavior that had ceased at the time of the hearing to the Seventh Circuit, and the court set aside the prior judgment. The government appealed the verdict to the U.S. Supreme Court.

== Opinion of the Court ==
The Court held that Section 6(b) of the Grain Futures Act could only be applied to ongoing activity, not activity that had ceased at the time of trial. The government argued that 6(b) had to apply retroactively due to the nature of ongoing investigations into reporting irregularities. The Respondent argued that the government had other remedies, so even if 6(b) were strictly construed, it would not limit the government's ability regulate the Respondent's ability to trade in grain futures. The Court declined to discuss any other possible remedies the government may have had, including section 9, and instead constructed 6(b) strictly. The Seventh Circuit decision was affirmed.

== See also ==
- Arthur W. Cutten
- List of United States Supreme Court cases on commodity and futures regulation
