= Harding Professor of Statistics in Public Life =

Professorship at the University of Cambridge

The Harding Professorship of Statistics in Public Life (formerly known as the Winton Professorship of the Public Understanding of Risk) is a professorship within the Statistical Laboratory of the University of Cambridge. It was established in 2007 in perpetuity by a benefaction of £3.3m from the Winton Charitable Foundation, later known as the David and Claudia Harding Foundation. It is the only professorship of its type in the United Kingdom. There is an associated internet-based program devoted to understanding uncertainty.

== List of Harding Professors ==
- David Spiegelhalter (2007–2020)
- John Aston (2021–)

== See also ==
- David Harding
