= SFO (disambiguation) =

SFO is the IATA code for the San Francisco International Airport.

SFO may also refer to:

- San Francisco Opera
- Santa Fe Opera, New Mexico, US
- Serious Fraud Office (United Kingdom)
- Serious Fraud Office (New Zealand)
- Single family office, managing a family's wealth
- Specialist Firearms Officer of UK police
- Stanford-le-Hope railway station, Essex, England (National Rail station code SFO)
- Station facility owner of a UK train operating company
- Subfornical organ, in the brain
- Stocks, Futures and Options Magazine, 2001-2012
