= TSPTALK =

TSP TALK is an online web communications website and forum established for federal employees and military personnel. It was originally created in 2004 by former federal employee and computer specialist Tom Crowley.

Though the board includes topics on various areas, the principal topic of the board is discussion surrounding investment strategies of various Thrift Savings Plan (TSP) retirement funds, specifically oriented toward individuals who preferred to change strategies depending on overall market conditions. The purpose was to help educate shareholders about investment planning and self-help.

Some investment styles and subjects were highlighted in fedsmith.com, another publication aimed at federal employees. The article comments included references to several competing websites, of which TSP TALK was the most often cited by readers. TSP TALK was identified in a trade publication for federal executives in November 2006 as one of several sites providing collaboration and discussions relating to federal employee investments. At the time, federal employees shared discussions of investment strategies, allocation theories, and held competitions on a member invented tracking listing showing daily returns. TSPTALK.COM first appeared in major government employee press article in a November 2006 article published in GOVEXEC.COM. Several other federal employee newspaper and publication articles followed.

== Controversy and regulation ==
Shortly after the 2006 article highlighted the activities of participants, the number of participants grew, and the Federal Retirement Thrift Investment Board (FRTIB), the TSP's oversight agency, began efforts to terminate the activities of the members. People were learning different investment styles and strategies, and shifting from a "buy and hold" mentality, to one of several different philosophies. These included swing trades, where a person would move part or all of their funds into a sector fund, and/or single-fund investing, where members invested solely in one fund for short periods of time, before reverting to the safety of the "G" fund, or government treasury funds. Web tracking showed an average of roughly 9 thousand unique visitors a day.

TSP TALK members became known as TSP TALKERS, and posted a wide range of information, including investment chart theory, reading charts, detecting trading signals, and occasionally political commentary.

The website became controversial in mid-2007 and early 2008, when the FRTIB (Federal Retirement Thrift Investment Board) cited frequent reallocation of savings by members of the group, and issued a ban on trades of more than two moves per month. The stated intention was to reduce costs for the funds. The board proposed new regulations to counter employees controlling their own investment funds. The changes were published as a notice of federal rule making published in the Federal Register on January 16, 2008, and were proposed to be effective March 31, 2008. TSP TALK members responded by creating a petition and submitted more than 4,000 signatures opposing the move. However, despite shareholder opposition, and as a result, changed federal regulations restricting moves between funds to two per month between all funds, and further moves to the G Fund only. As a result of the ban, trading costs actually increased, rather than decreased. For 2009, costs increased 32%.
