= Sentinel Management Group =

- Company type: Private
- Industry: Finance
- Founder: Philip Bloom
- Headquarters: Northbrook, Illinois, United States of America
- Key people: Philip Bloom (Founder); Eric A. Bloom (CEO)

Sentinel Management Group was a cash-management firm based in Northbrook, Illinois.

== Background ==
Sentinel invested for clients such as managed-futures funds, high-net-worth individuals and hedge funds that want to be able to withdraw their cash quickly. Investments included short-term commercial paper, foreign currency, investment-grade bonds and Treasury notes, according to the Website. They oversaw approximately $1.6 billion. It was founded by Philip Bloom and the CEO was his son, Eric A. Bloom.

== Events ==
According to an August 13, 2007 client letter posted on thestreet.com, the company contacted the Commodity Futures Trading Commission asking for approval to halt redemptions. The letter stated in part that Sentinel Management Group is "concerned that we cannot meet any significant redemption requests without selling securities at deep discounts to their fair value and therefore causing unnecessary losses to our clients."

On August 14, the National Futures Association visited Sentinel's offices to review the company's records and prepare a report. The NFA found that "Sentinel failed to maintain adequate books and records, including records to demonstrate the location" of some accounts.

Late on Friday, August 17, 2007 the firm filed for Chapter 11 bankruptcy protection. The filing stated that Sentinel estimated assets and liabilities as both exceeding $100 million, and estimated that it had over 200 creditors. The law firm of Goldberg Kohn Bell Black Rosenbloom and Moritz Ltd. was hired to represent them in the bankruptcy petition. The bankruptcy was filed after a judge sought to block Sentinel from selling assets to the hedge fund company Citadel Investment Group LLC. This stopped the withdrawals, which caused two brokerages, Farr Financial Inc. and Velocity Futures LP, to sue Sentinel.

On August 20, 2007, the NFA report was presented in bankruptcy court. That same day, the SEC filed a complaint in the U.S. District Court in Chicago, alleging that Sentinel had defrauded clients in two ways. First, that Sentinel improperly commingled $460 million in securities from client's investment accounts into Sentinel's proprietary "house account", and secondly, that Sentinel used securities from their client's accounts as collateral to obtain a $321 million line of credit and other leveraged financing. Sentinel allegedly disguised these acts by providing falsified account statements.

On June 1, 2012, Eric A. Bloom (CEO) and Charles K. Mosley head trader were indicted on federal fraud charges for allegedly defrauding more than 70 customers of more than $500 million before the firm collapsed in August 2007.

On March 25, 2014, the chief executive officer of the bankrupt Sentinel Management Group, Inc., was convicted of defrauding more than 70 customers of more than $500 million before the firm collapsed in August 2007. The defendant, ERIC A. BLOOM, misappropriated securities belonging to customers by using them as collateral for a loan that Sentinel obtained from Bank of New York Mellon Corp., which was used, in part, to purchase millions of dollars' worth of high-risk, illiquid securities, not for customers but for a trading portfolio maintained for the benefit of Sentinel's officers, including Bloom, members of his family, and corporations controlled by the Bloom family.
