= Jess Greenberg =

Musical artist and YouTuber (born 1994)

- Born: 20 December 1994 (age 31); London, England
- Genres: Acoustic rock
- Instruments: Guitar, vocals

Jess Greenberg (born 20 December 1994) is an English YouTube personality, singer, and acoustic guitarist from London.

== Biography ==
Greenberg started performing publicly at an early age. In an interview, she recounted performing Elvis Presley's "Can't Help Falling in Love" at age four during a trip to St. Tropez, singing for an audience at the Hotel Byblos. "I requested 'Can't Help Falling in Love' by Elvis, and the performer asked if I'd sing it. I remember being so excited."

She later described the impact of the 2003 Jack Black film School of Rock on her musical interests: "I remember that changing my view of music completely. I started listening to AC/DC, Guns N' Roses, Red Hot Chili Peppers … and I realized how much I loved rock music." Greenberg has also cited Jimi Hendrix as "one of my biggest inspirations."

Greenberg began posting cover recordings of songs on YouTube in 2010 at age 15. In December 2012, she was selected as Female Artist of the Month by Star Central magazine. She gained wider recognition after winning Ryan Seacrest's "Totally Covered Summer" competition in August 2013 for her cover of "Get Lucky" by Daft Punk. Greenberg also attracted significant attention for her cover of AC/DC's "Highway to Hell" in August 2013.

In 2012, Greenberg stated that although she aspired "to be a [professional] musician," she intended to study economics at University College London. She later pursued a degree in Statistics, Economics, and Finance after completing her A-levels.

Following her graduation, Greenberg joined Goldman Sachs as a financial analyst. In October 2016, she left Goldman Sachs to work as an analyst at Winton Capital, where she remained until October 2020. In November 2020, she became an associate at BlackRock in London, where she continues to work.

== YouTube ==
As of February 2025, Greenberg's YouTube channel had over 1.39 million subscribers and more than 207 million total views.

In August 2014, Greenberg's cover of "Enter Sandman" by Metallica was featured by the online edition of Sports Illustrated, which described it as "the best-looking Metallica cover you'll see today". In October 2014, Greenberg was featured on the website of Guitar World magazine for her covers of Led Zeppelin's "Rock and Roll" and "Whole Lotta Love", performed with "solos and all" in conjunction with the release of the remastered version of their album, Led Zeppelin IV.

Greenberg was featured in a March 2015 article in Metro UK by Caroline Westbrook. Westbrook noted that Greenberg, then 20 years old, had accumulated over 70 million views on YouTube and was on her way to becoming an "internet star." She acknowledged that while Greenberg had received attention for her physical appearance, it was her musical talent that kept her in the spotlight.

== See also ==
- List of YouTube personalities
