= Arthur W. Cutten =

American businessman (1870–1936)

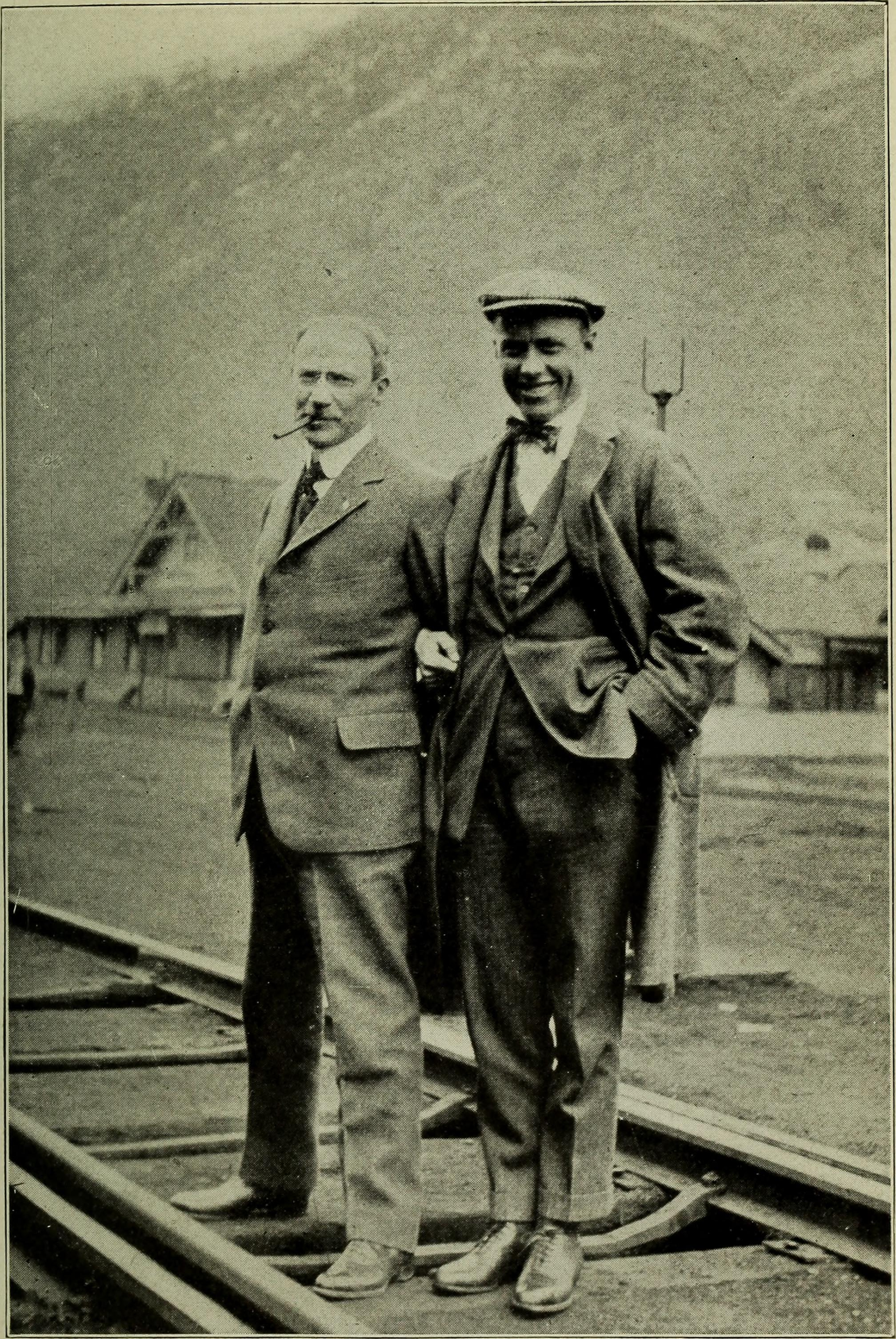
Cutten (left) with Chick Evans

Arthur William Cutten (July 6, 1870 – June 24, 1936) was a Canadian-born businessman who gained great wealth and prominence as a commodity speculator in the United States. He was called to appear before the Banking and Currency Committee in regard to the causes of the Wall Street crash of 1929. He was under indictment for tax evasion upon his death in Chicago in 1936.

== Early life ==
Born in the rural community of Guelph, Ontario, Arthur Cutten was the second of nine children of Walter Hoyt Cutten (1844–1915), a prominent Guelph barrister, and his wife Annie McFadden.

These nine children were:

1. Walter Edward Cutten (1868–1912)
2. Arthur William Cutten (1870–1936)
3. Lionel Forbes Cutten (1871–1938)
4. Marion Mabel Katherine Cutten (1872–1873)
5. Evelyn Mary 'Lenore' Cutten (1874–1945)
6. Albert Patrick Henry 'Harry' Cutten (1876–1949)
7. Charles Lawrence S. Cutten (1877–1900)
8. Annie Constance 'Connie' Cutten 1879–1944)
9. Ralph James M. Cutten (1887–1970)

After studying at Guelph Collegiate, in 1888 a young Arthur Cutten left home, making his way to the United States where he settled in the rapidly growing city of Chicago. Hired by commodity broker A. S. White & Co., he worked as the company's bookkeeper for $4 a week. Cutten's employer was part of a growing business community that made Chicago a major economic bridge between the established financial community in New York City and the emerging farm producers of the American Midwest. Having grown up in a farming community, Arthur Cutten understood the up and down nature of farm production and his job with the Chicago broker afforded him the opportunity to learn the intricacies of trading in commodities on the Chicago Board of Trade.

After working at the brokerage house for some time, Arthur Cutten felt confident enough to approach his boss with a request to open a trading account. Dismissed out of hand by his employer because of his lowly position and modest means, the frugal Arthur Cutten used his limited savings from his employment income to begin speculating on commodity prices through the purchase of forward contracts. While highly risky, speculating on the future price of commodities could bring enormous profits on a very small amount of invested capital. Cutten built a small fortune speculating on the price of several products, but most notably by capitalizing on the rising prices during the boom in demand for Midwest wheat. By 1906, his investments had made him a very wealthy young man, and he left his employer to set up his own investment operation with a seat on the Chicago Board of Trade. In the next few years, he made and lost a fortune betting on the price of cotton but accepted losses as a normal part of the business of speculating, and continued to successfully invest.

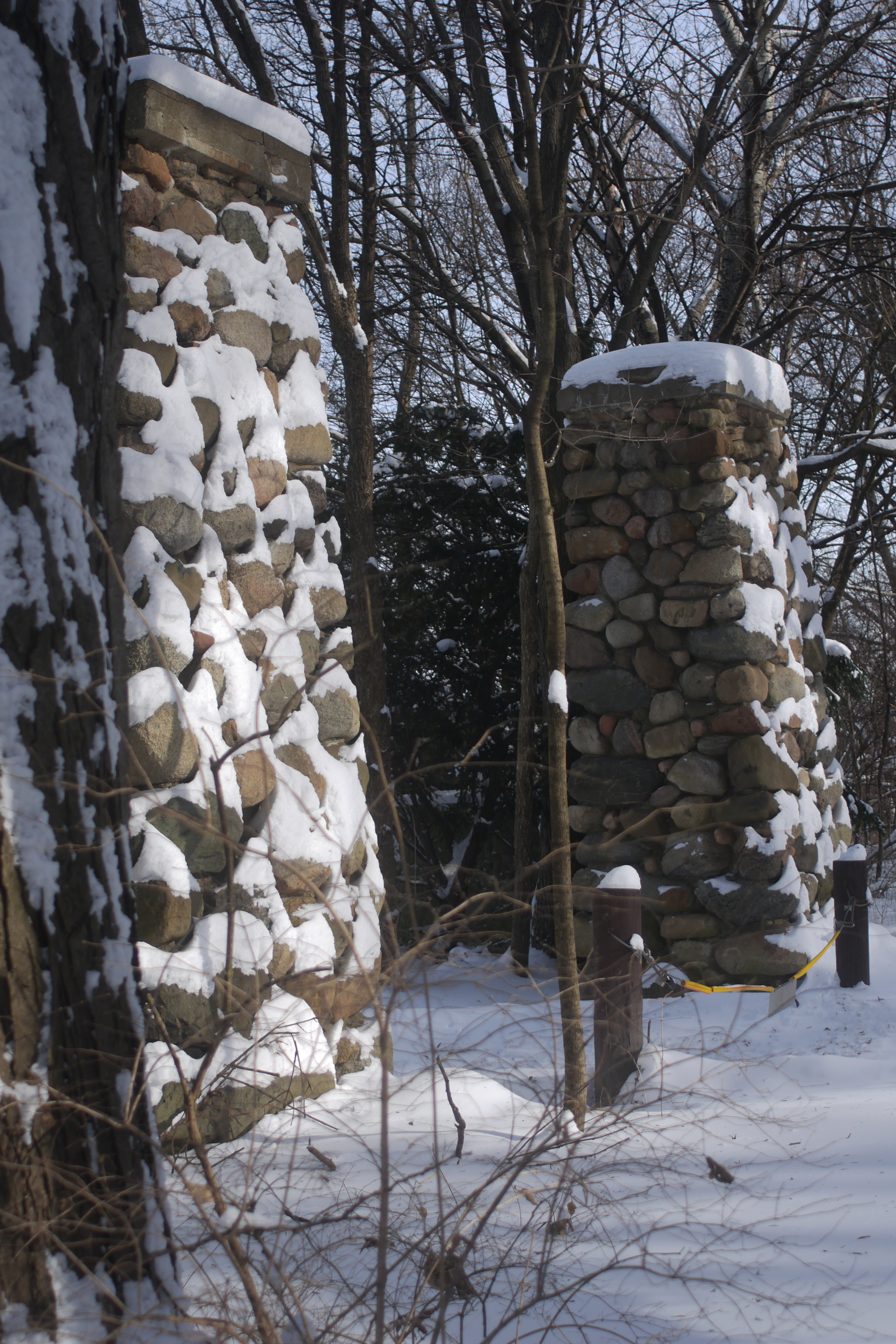
Stone gates at the entrance of Arthur W. Cutten's estate formerly known as Sunny Acres Farm near property owned by Joy Morton, founder of the Morton Salt Company, in what is now Hidden Lake Forest Preserve, DuPage, County, Illinois.

Arthur Cutten frequently referred to himself as a "dirt farmer", and in 1912 he bought a 500-acre (2 km^{2}) farm property adjacent to property owned by Joy Morton, founder of the Morton Salt Company, not far from Chicago in DuPage County, Illinois, in what is now the Hidden Lake Forest Preserve. Cutten called his home "Sunny Acres Farm" and there built a large mansion with extensive gardens that included two 12-foot-high (3.7 m), 5^{1}/_{2}-ton statues representing agriculture and industry; these once stood on the second-floor ledge above the main entrance to the old Chicago Board of Trade Building by W.W. Boyington, which had been torn down in 1929 to make way for the new CBOT building designed by Holabird & Root.

== Philanthropy in Guelph ==
Arthur Cutten never forgot his roots in rural Ontario and donated funds for the construction of a number of community charities and local projects. During the early part of his career he donated to the Woodlawn Cemetery and the YMCA. In 1925–26 he donated a carillon, organ, choir loft, and stained glass to St. George's Anglican Church. His most memorable gift is the Cutten Fields golf course. Construction began at the height of his financial success around 1929, and the course opened in 1931. The golf course property was eventually purchased by the University of Guelph, and the golf club remains in operation in 2015.

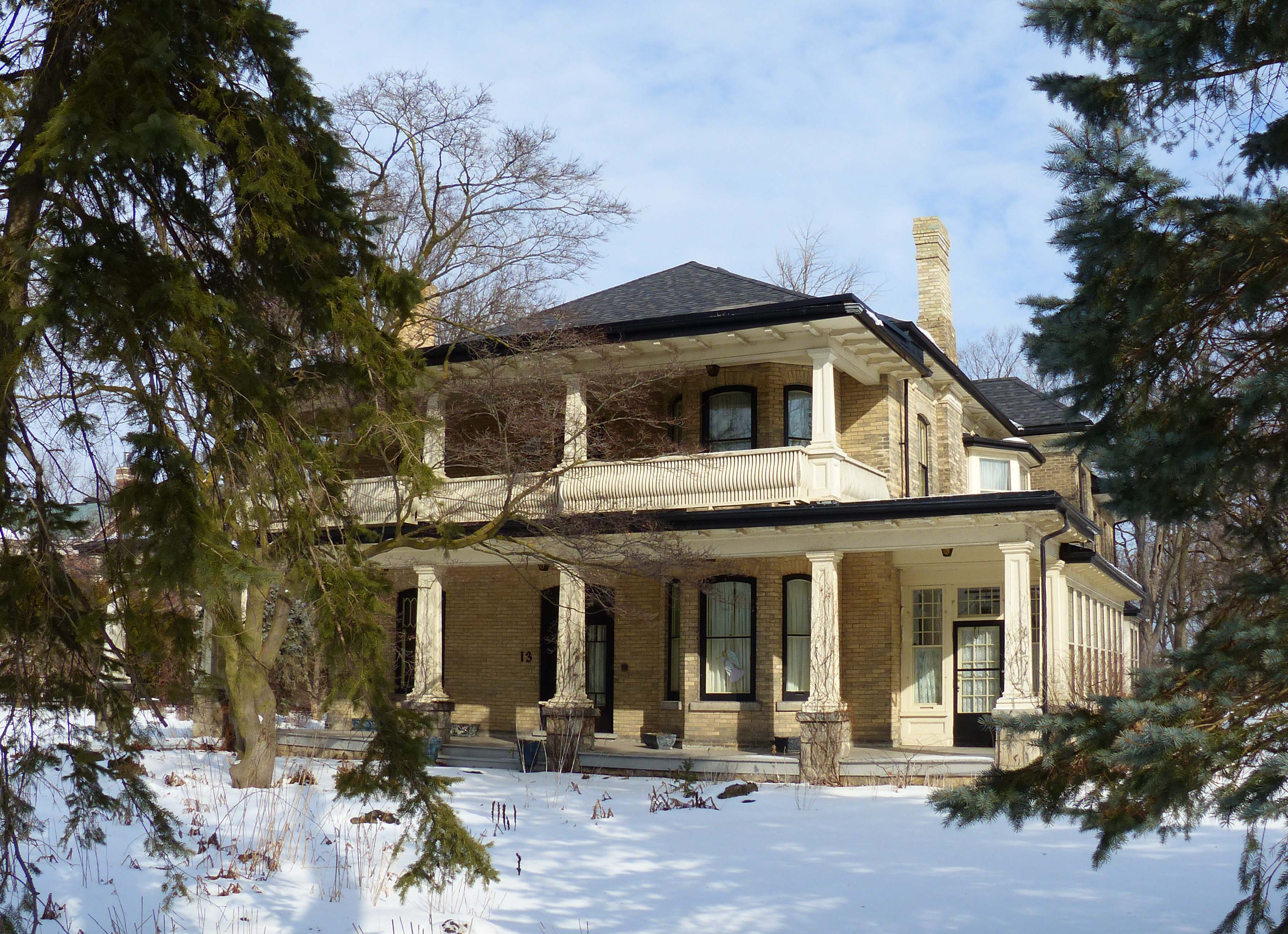
1905 gift to his siblings

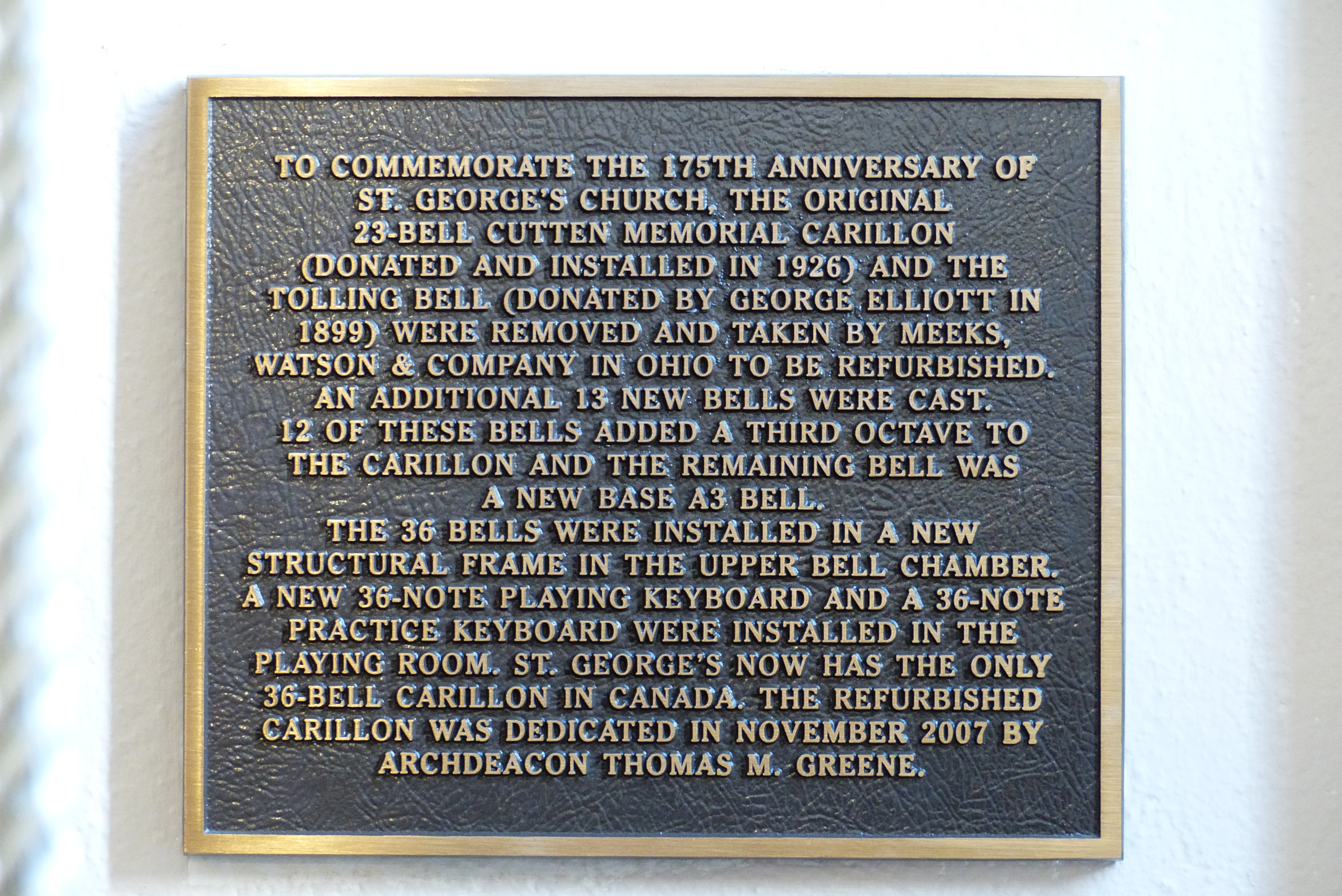
1926 carillon in St. George's Church

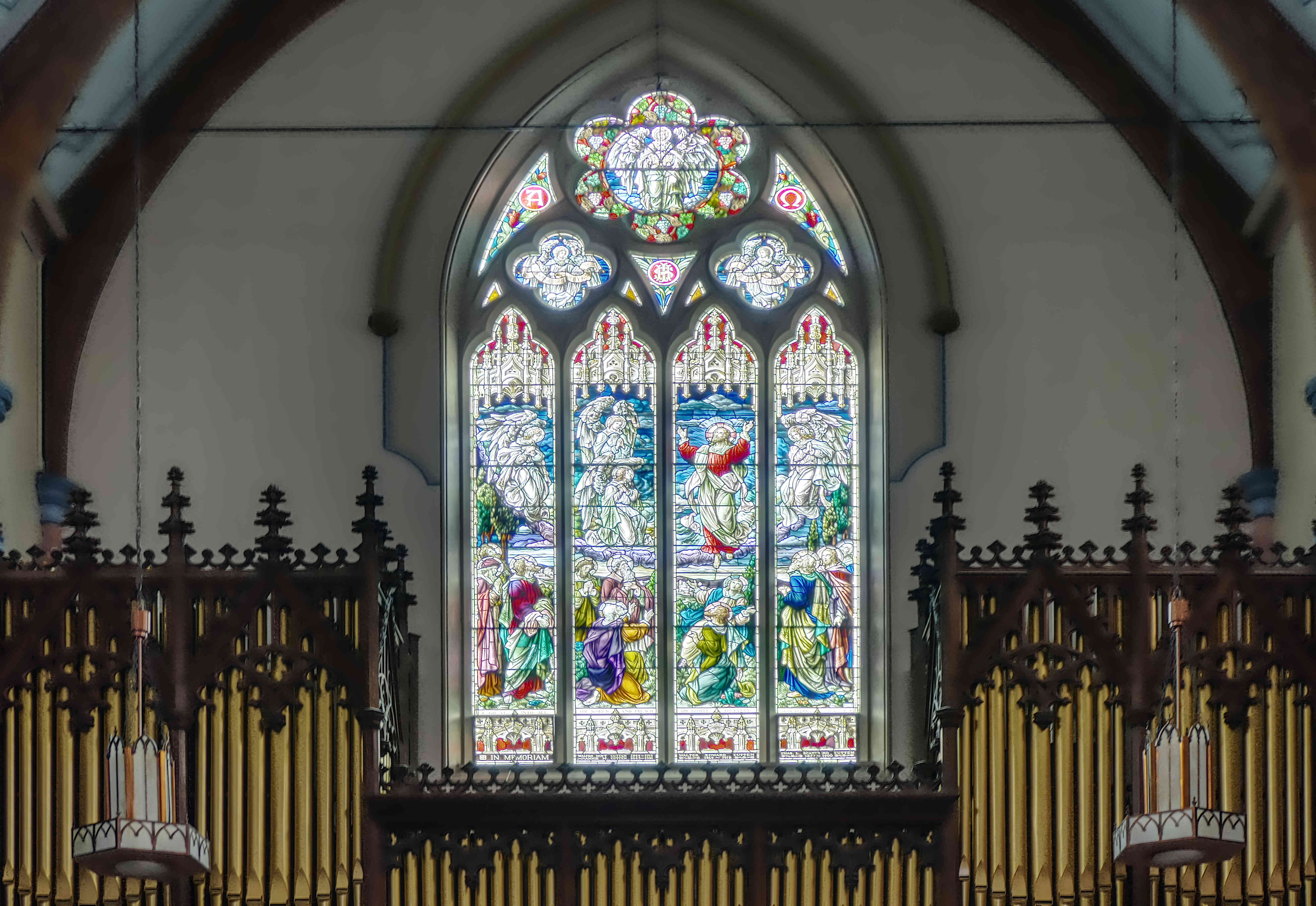
Stained glass in St. George's Church

== Speculation charges and death ==
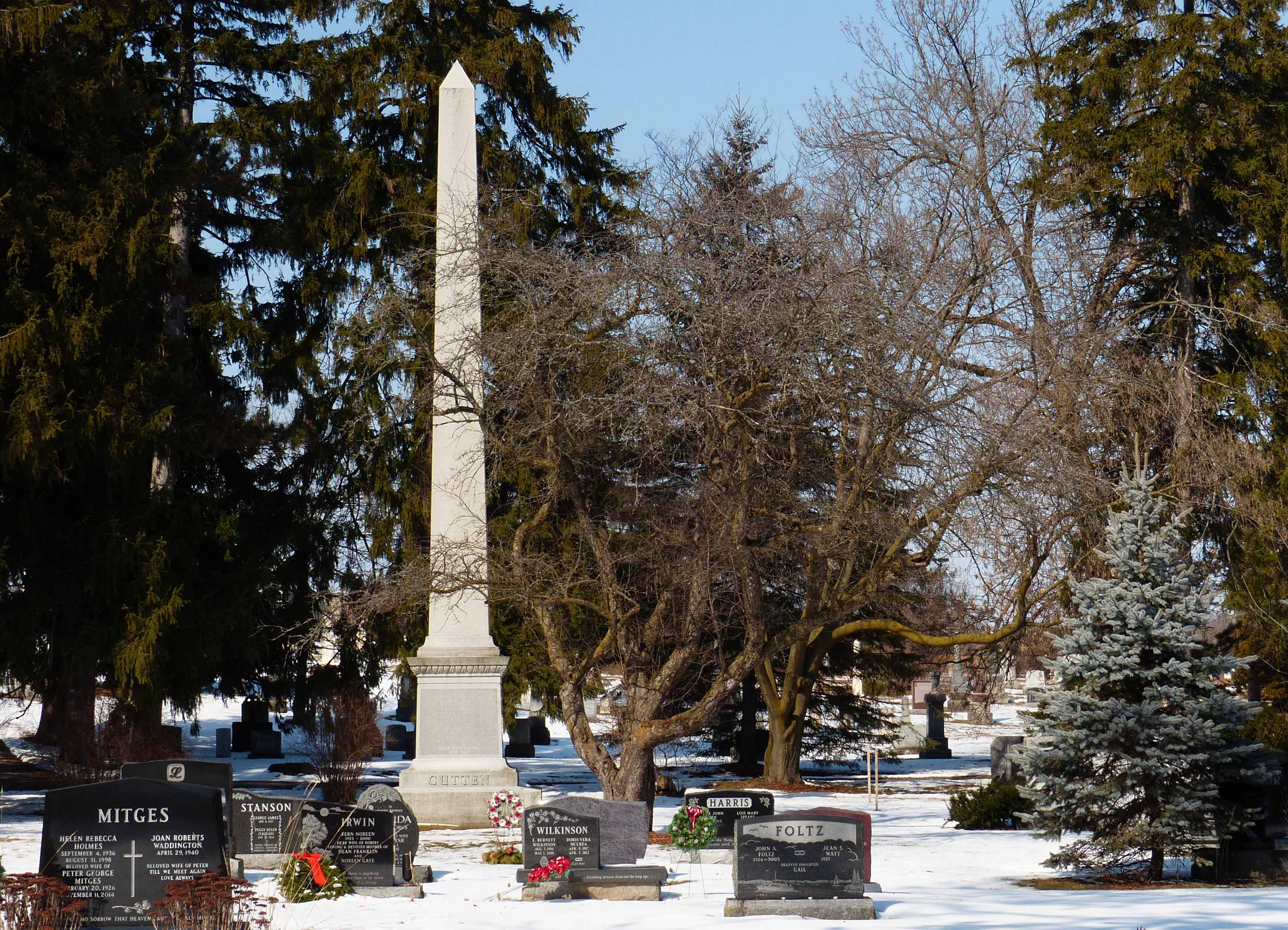
Cutten's grave in Guelph

During the boom years of the 1920s, Cutten rose to national prominence as one of the United States' most important commodities and stock speculators. He acquired a home in Atlantic City, New Jersey, and made himself an important player on Wall Street, where his success eclipsed even that of the renowned stock speculator Jesse Livermore, with whom he often battled as a bull vs. the often bearish short seller Livermore. In the crash of 1929, Livermore's fortune reached new heights, while Cutten's dwindled (but Livermore died broke several years later). In 1925, farm prices began a steady fall, from which they would not permanently recover for more than 15 years. Nevertheless, at the time Arthur Cutten remained optimistic about the American economy and was featured in a cover story of the December 10, 1928, issue of Time in a profile as one of the leading market "Bulls" of the Big Bull Market of the 1920s. However, less than a year later Cutten had lost more than $50 million as a result of the Wall Street Crash of 1929. The ensuing investigation of the crash by the United States Senate's Pecora Commission brought a public outcry over rich speculators such as Cutten who had made huge amounts of money by forming trading pools to manipulate market prices. New legislation was introduced to end market manipulation, and the U.S. government targeted certain of the high-profile speculators.

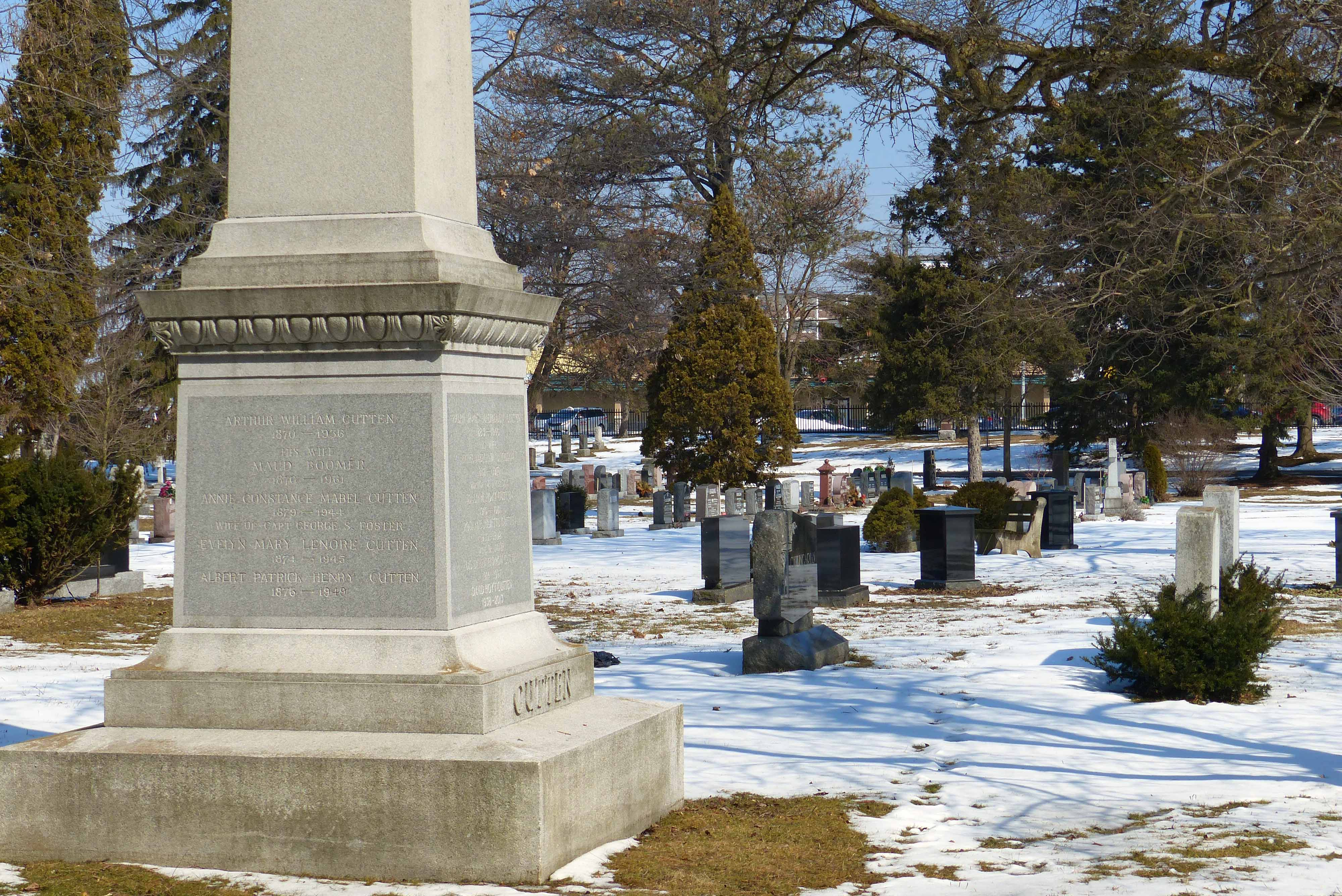
The base of Cutten's monument

Henry A. Wallace, the then United States Secretary of Agriculture charged Cutten with improper trading activities and tried to have him barred from trading on all futures exchanges in the United States. This ultimately went to the US Supreme Court in the case of Wallace v. Cutten, 298 U.S. 229 (1936)

The government then went after him for income tax evasion. The tax suit would only be settled by the executors of his estate, because Arthur Cutten, his fortune vastly depleted by the stock market crash and the cost of lawyers to defend him from the government lawsuits, died in Chicago of a heart attack a few weeks short of his sixty-sixth birthday. His body was brought back to his Canadian birthplace and interred in the family plot in Guelph's Woodlawn Cemetery.

== See also ==
- "Guelph's Wheat King: Arthur Cutten", by Pat Montague, originally published in The Wellington Business Digest, Vol. 1, Issue 5, April 1985
