= Commodity Futures Trading Commission Act of 1974 =

U.S. legislative act

- Long title: An Act to amend the Commodity Exchange Act to strengthen the regulation of futures trading, to bring all agricultural and other commodities traded on exchanges under regulation, and for other purposes.
- Enacted by: the 93rd United States Congress
- Effective: October 23, 1974

Citations
- Public law: 93-463
- Statutes at Large: 88 Stat. 1389

Codification
- Titles amended: 7 U.S.C.: Agriculture
- U.S.C. sections amended: 7 U.S.C. ch. 1 § 4a

Legislative history
- Introduced in the House as H.R. 13113 by William R. Poage (D-TX) on February 27, 1974; Committee consideration by House Agriculture, Senate Agriculture and Forestry; Passed the House on April 11, 1974 (281-43); Passed the Senate on September 9, 1974 (passed); Reported by the joint conference committee on September 27, 1974; agreed to by the House on October 9, 1974 (375-4) and by the Senate on October 10, 1974 (agreed); Signed into law by President Gerald Ford on October 23, 1974

Commodity Futures Trading Commission (CFTC) Act of 1974 (P.L. 93-463) created the Commodity Futures Trading Commission, to replace the U.S. Department of Agriculture's Commodity Exchange Authority, as the independent federal agency responsible for regulating the futures trading industry. The Act made extensive changes in the basic authority of Commodity Exchange Act of 1936, which itself had made extensive changes in the original Grain Futures Act of 1922. (7 U.S.C. 1 et seq.).

The H.R. 13113 legislation was passed by the 93rd U.S. Congressional session and signed into law by the 38th President of the United States Gerald Ford on October 23, 1974.
