= Commodity trading advisor =

US financial regulatory term for an advisor in trading futures contracts

A commodity trading advisor (CTA) is US financial regulatory term for an individual or organization who is retained by a fund or individual client to provide advice and services related to trading in futures contracts, commodity options and/or swaps. They are responsible for the trading within managed futures accounts. The definition of CTA may also apply to investment advisors for hedge funds and private funds including mutual funds and exchange-traded funds in certain cases. CTAs are generally regulated by the United States federal government through registration with the Commodity Futures Trading Commission (CFTC) and membership of the National Futures Association (NFA).

== Characteristics ==
=== Trading activities ===
A CTA generally acts as an asset manager, following a set of investment strategies utilizing futures contracts and options on futures contracts on a wide variety of physical goods such as agricultural products, forest products, metals, and energy, plus derivative contracts on financial instruments such as indices, bonds, and currencies. The trading programs employed by CTAs can be characterized by their market strategy, whether trend following or market neutral, and the market segment, such as financial, agricultural or currency.

There are three major styles of investment employed by CTAs: technical, fundamental, and quantitative. Technical traders invest after analysing chart patterns. They often employ partially automated systems, such as computer software programs, to follow price trends, perform technical analysis, and execute trades. Successful trend following, or using technical analysis techniques to capture swings in markets may drive a CTA's performance and activity to a large degree. In 2010, Dr. Galen Burghardt, adjunct professor at the University of Chicago's Booth School of Business, found a correlation of 0.97 between a subset of trend following CTAs and a broader CTA index from the period 2000–2009, indicating that speculative technical trend following had been dominant within the CTA community. Fundamental traders attempt to forecast prices by analyzing supply and demand factors, amongst other market information, in their attempt to realize profits. Other non-trend following CTAs include short-term traders, spread trading and individual market specialists. Fundamental CTA's typically invest based on analysis of the core markets they are trading, by analysing weather patterns, farm yields, understanding oil drilling volumes etc. Quantitative CTA's do statistical or quantitative analysis on market price patterns and try to make predictions based on such research. Many Quantitative CTA's have backgrounds in science, mathematics, statistics and engineering.

=== Compensation ===
A CTA is often compensated through management fees calculated as an annual percentage of equity in the fund and incentive fees calculated as a percentage of new trading profits. Usually no incentive fees are charged if the CTA does not generate a profit exceeding a hurdle rate or high-water mark. For investors it is noteworthy to consider the impact of the risk free rate and the impact that has on hurdle rates and compensation for a particular manager.

=== Performance ===
CTA Performance has been challenging over the last decade and investors have debated the beneficial characteristics of CTAs and trend followers at length. While one can argue that markets trends have been dominated by central banks' actions, thereby limiting the potential of trends to develop, one can also argue that central bank policy has started several trends in risky assets. Investors need to carefully judge the investment program, where past performance has not been indicative of future results but where research-oriented efforts have been a clear focus for managers trying to raise assets and outcompete other futures managers. That said, most investors evaluate CTA based on past performance using a variety of different techniques. CTA performance data tends to be freely available to qualified investors and can be found for instance at BarclayHedge, EurekaHedge, NilssonHedge and a large number of other hedge fund databases.

== History ==
In the United States, trading of futures contracts for agricultural commodities dates back to at least the 1850s. The first Federal regulation aimed at futures trading was proposed in the early 1920s, leading to the passage of the Grain Futures Act in 1922. In 1936, this law was replaced by an amended version named the Commodity Exchange Act. The "commodity trading advisor" was first recognized in legislation in 1974, when the Commodity Futures Trading Commission (CFTC) was established under the Commodity Futures Trading Commission Act. The name CTA was adopted since the advisors originally operated predominantly within the commodities markets. Later, trading expanded significantly following the introduction of derivatives on other products including financial instruments.

In July 2010, the definition of commodity trading advisor under the Commodity Exchange Act was expanded by the Dodd-Frank Wall Street Reform and Consumer Protection Act to include "persons who provide advice on swap transactions". Prior to this, swaps were not included in the CTA definition.

== Regulation ==
=== Historical regulation ===
In 1979, the CFTC adopted the first comprehensive regulation for commodity trading advisors, which was later strengthened by additional rules in 1983 and 1995. The additional rules in 1983 increased the CFTC's oversight of such advisors and authorized the National Futures Association (NFA) to carry out processing of registration for entities including CTAs. Those adopted in 1995 aimed to increase disclosure by CTAs leading to increased knowledge and understanding for investors.

=== Current regulation ===
Under the Commodity Exchange Act, CTAs must register with and conform to the regulations of the CFTC, including providing records and reports, unless they meet the Commission's criteria for exemption. Registered CTAs must also become members of the NFA if they manage funds or provide advice to members of the public.

Under the Commodity Exchange Act qualifying individuals may be exempted from CTA registration with the CFTC, including if their primary business is not as a CTA, they are registered with the Securities and Exchange Commission as an investment advisor, and if they have not provided trading advice to more than 15 persons. If an individual is exempt from registration, they must still file with the NFA. A CTA is exempt from registration with the NFA if they have provided commodity trading advice to fewer than 15 people and do not generally use the title commodity trading advisor, or if they provide advice only through publications, a computerized system or seminars.

Nonetheless, exempt CTAs are still regulated in some form. They are still subject to CFTC rules concerning market manipulation as well as the anti-fraud provisions of the CEA. They additionally need to file a public notice disclosing their existence and exempt status. They must provide an offering memorandum to their investors, as well as a quarterly account statement and an annual report. In addition, exempt CTAs are subject to "special call" provision, where they are, amongst other things, required to file special reports to the CFTC. These reports are used for market surveillance as well as for investigations or litigation cases.

=== Changes following Dodd-Frank ===
On January 26, 2011, following the 2010 enactment of the Dodd-Frank Wall Street Reform and Consumer Protection Act, the CFTC made additions and amendments to the regulation of CTAs, including two new forms of data collection. The CFTC also increased disclosure requirements and amended the registration criteria. Due to these changes, advisors managing funds that use swaps or other commodity interests may be defined as CTAs, subject to registration with the CFTC. The United States Chamber of Commerce and the Investment Company Institute filed a lawsuit against the CFTC, aiming to overturn this change to rules that would require the operators of mutual funds investing in commodities to be registered, but the lawsuit was unsuccessful and the rule change was upheld.

=== Exemption from registration under the Investment Advisers Act of 1940 ===
If a commodity trading advisor engages in significant advisory activities regarding securities, it could be required to register under the Investment Advisers Act of 1940 (Advisers Act). However, most commodity trading advisors are able to rely on an exemption from registration set forth in Section 203(b)(6) of the Advisers Act. This exemption is available to registered commodity trading advisors whose business does not consist primarily of acting as an investment adviser.
