= Hill v. Wallace =

- Supreme Court of the United States

Argued January 11, 1922 Decided May 15, 1922
- Full case name: Hill et al. v. Wallace, Secretary of Agriculture et al.
- Citations: 259 U.S. 44 (more) 42 S. Ct. 453; 66 L. Ed. 822; 1922 U.S. LEXIS 2459

Holding
- The Futures Trading Act of 1921, approved August 24, 1921. 42 Stat. 187, c. 86, which attempted to institute Federal regulation of grain futures contract trading by imposing a prohibitive tax on futures contracts traded on any market other than those that met the requirements of the statute and were regulated by the Secretary of Agriculture was an unconstitutional exercise of the taxing power of Congress.

Court membership
- Chief Justice William H. Taft Associate Justices Joseph McKenna · Oliver W. Holmes Jr. William R. Day · Willis Van Devanter; Mahlon Pitney · James C. McReynolds; Louis Brandeis · John H. Clarke

Case opinions
- Majority: Taft, joined by McKenna, Holmes, Day, Van Devanter, Pitney, McReynolds, Clarke
- Concurrence: Brandeis

Laws applied
- US Constitution Article I, Sec. 8.

Hill v. Wallace, 259 U.S. 44 (1922), was a U.S. Supreme Court decision overturning the legality of the Futures Trading Act of 1921. The law, approved August 24, 1921, by the U.S. Congress attempted to institute Federal regulation of grain futures contract trading by imposing a prohibitive tax on futures contracts traded on any market other than those that met the statute's requirements and were regulated by the Secretary of Agriculture. The court found it was an unconstitutional exercise of the taxing power of Congress. Congress responded to the Court's decision by passing the Grain Futures Act in September 1922 based on the Commerce Clause. The Grain Futures Act was held to be constitutional by the Court in Board of Trade of City of Chicago v. Olsen (1923)

== See also ==
- List of United States Supreme Court cases, volume 259
