= E. Lee Hennessee =

American businesswoman

- Born: September 1, 1952; Raleigh, North Carolina
- Died: October 29, 2016 (aged 64); West Palm Beach, Florida, U.S.
- Education: Randolph-Macon Woman's College
- Occupation: Hedge Fund Co-Founder
- Employer: Hennessee Hedge Fund LLC
- Known for: Hedge Fund Pioneer, Philanthropy
- Spouse: Charles J. Gradante

Elizabeth Lee Hennessee (September 1, 1952 – October 29, 2016), also known as Lee Hennessee-Gradante, was an American pioneer hedge fund manager, noted as one of the most powerful women in New York, she was also campaign finance chair for Elizabeth Dole's presidential run. Hennessee and her husband, Charles J. Gradante, founded and managed the Hennessee Group LLC hedge fund for many years.

== Early life and education ==
Hennessee was born on September 1, 1952, to William E. Hennessee and Mary Frances Dillon in Raleigh, North Carolina. Her father was the senior vice president of advertising and tobacco sales at the Dillon Supply Company. Lee graduated from Randolph-Macon Women's College. After graduating, Hennessee worked as a teacher for one year.

== Business career ==
In 1976, Hennessee started her business career at Thomson McKinnon Securities, where she executed institutional and retail sales. Later, Hennessee founded the first and prominent hedge fund consultancy. She started the Hennessee Hedge Fund Advisory Group in 1987 as a division of E.F. Hutton, later moving it to Shearson Lehman, Republic National Bank, and the investment firm Weiss, Peck and Greer. In 1997, along with her husband, Charles J. Gradante, she transformed the operation into a stand-alone company, the Hennessee Group LLC. In July 2005, the Bayou hedge fund fraud unraveled and was reported to the Securities and Exchange Commission, but the lawsuit against Hennessee Group LLC was dismissed in July 2007.

In 1999, Hennessee served as a finance chair for Republican presidential candidate Elizabeth Dole. In 2005, she served as finance chair for the New York City Billy Graham Crusade.

Hennessee broke ground as a woman on male-dominated Wall Street, creating a hedge fund index and becoming a co-founder of 100 Women in Hedge Funds. Hennessee was a featured hedge fund expert in the media such as The New York Times, The Wall Street Journal, and CNBC. The Hennessee Group managed as much as $1.6 billion and helped wealthy clients choose hedge funds. In May 2007, Hennessee was selected as one of New York's 50 most powerful women.

In 2013, Hennessee Group sold off its hedge fund advisory to Terrapin Asset Management. It retained its Hennessee Hedge Fund Index.

== Personal life ==
Hennessee met Charles J. Gradante in 1991, and they married on October 31, 1992, at the St. Bartholomew's Episcopal Church in New York.

October 29, 2016, Hennessee was found dead in her Trump Plaza home in West Palm Beach. She was 64. Hennessee is survived by her husband, her mother and two brothers, William and Grover (who is known as Dillon) Hennessee.

== Philanthropy ==
Hennessee was a trustee of Palm Beach Atlantic University and national chairwoman and founding member of Easter Seals Florida's annual Kentucky Derby charity event. She served as a finance chair for Elizabeth Dole's presidential campaign and the 2005 New York City Billy Graham Crusade. In addition, Hennessee co-founded the New York City Christian Women's Fellowship, which folded into Campus Crusade. She was widely reported to be active in Palm Beach charities, including the Junior League, the March of Dimes, Palm Beach Island Cats, HomeSafe, the It Happened To Alexa Foundation and the Salvation Army. In 2016, Hennessee was honored by the Salvation Army and acted as the chairwoman of the Salvation Army's 45th. Annual Gala, held at Mar-a-Lago Estate in Palm Beach, Florida.

== Awards and honors ==
In 2007, The New York Post named Hennessee to its list of the city's 50 most powerful women.
