= Paul Schott Stevens =

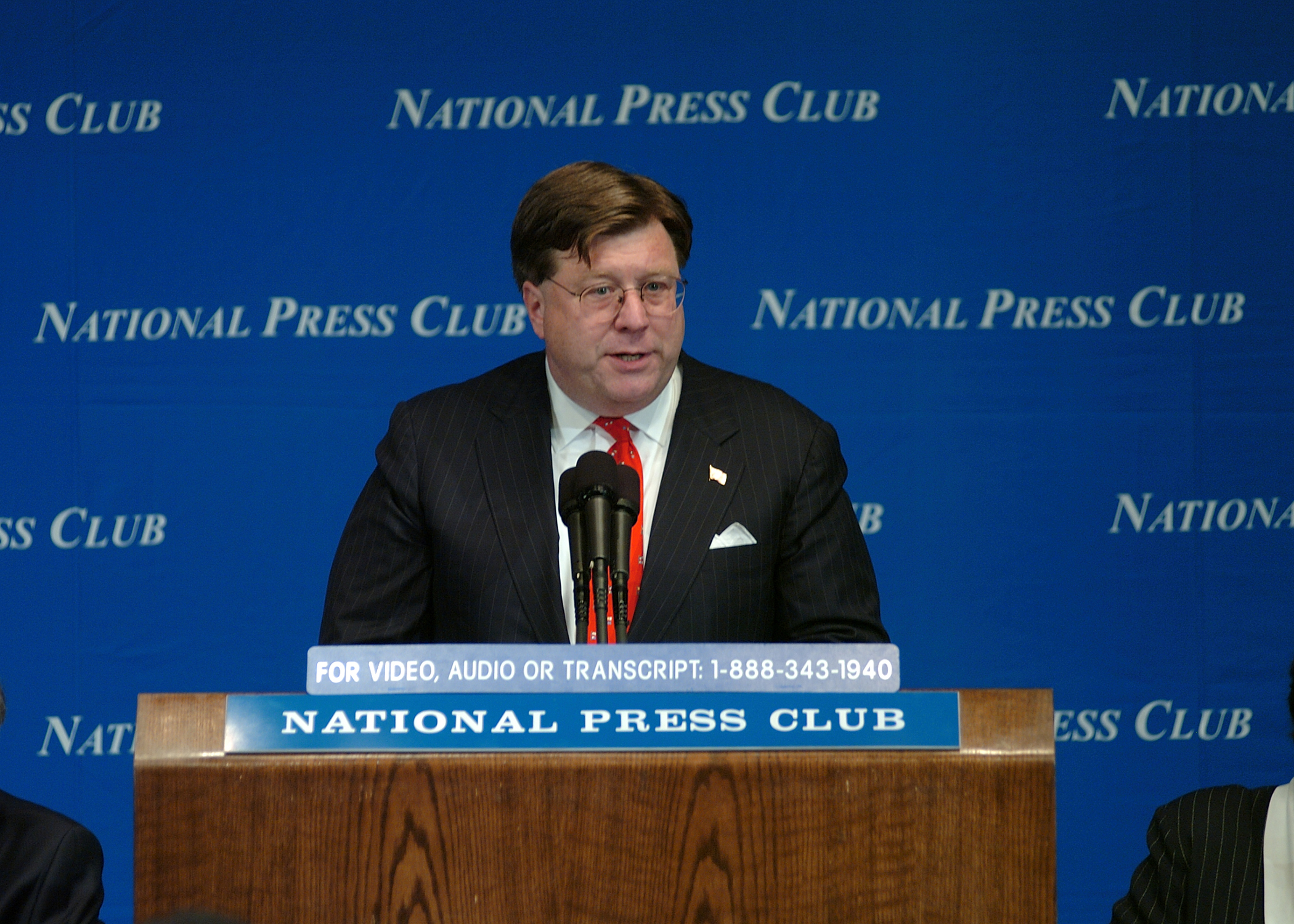
- Paul Schott Stevens addresses an audience at the National Press Club in June 2004.
- Born: November 19, 1952 (age 73); New Orleans, LA
- Education: Yale University, University of Virginia
- Occupations: President, Investment Company Institute
- Years active: 2004–2020
- Spouse: Joyce (Pilz)
- Awards: Medal for Distinguished Public Service

Paul Schott Stevens is an American attorney who served as the president of Investment Company Institute from 2004 to 2020. He served on the National Security Council under President Ronald Reagan.

== Education and early law career ==
Paul Schott Stevens was born November 19, 1952, in New Orleans, Louisiana. He graduated magna cum laude with a B.A. from Yale University in 1974, and received a J.D. from the University of Virginia in 1978. Following his graduation, Stevens practiced law in Washington, D.C., and was a partner in the firm of Dickstein, Shapiro and Morin. In 1984 he was part of a team representing Edwin Meese during an investigation by the Independent Counsel prior to his confirmation as Attorney General. In 1992, Stevens argued before the United States Supreme Court in Saudi Arabia v. Nelson, representing the respondents. From 1980 to 1983, he was also an adjunct lecturer in law at the Washington College of Law at the American University.

== Government service ==
From September 1985-July 1986, Stevens served as Deputy Director and General Counsel of President Reagan's Blue Ribbon Commission on Defense Management, also known as the Packard Commission. In January 1987, President Reagan appointed him Special Assistant to the President for National Security Affairs and the first Legal Adviser of National Security Council. He appointed Stevens Executive Secretary of the National Security Council in November of the same year, replacing Grant S. Green Jr., who assumed responsibilities at the Department of Defense.

In 1989, Stevens joined the transition team for Sen. John Tower, following his nomination for Secretary of Defense by President George H. W. Bush. After Tower's nomination was rejected, Stevens remained at the Pentagon, serving Dick Cheney as Executive Assistant to the Secretary of Defense. Upon leaving government service, he was awarded the Medal for Distinguished Public Service, the Defense Department's highest civilian decoration.

== Continued involvement in national security affairs ==
From 2002 to 2006, Stevens served as a member of the Markle Task Force on National Security in the Information Age. Established by the Markle Foundation, the task force was a bipartisan collaboration of national security experts from six presidential administrations, as well as senior information technology executives and privacy and civil liberties advocates. In its reports, the task force recommended ways to use information and information technology to establish national information systems that would both protect privacy and prevent terror. Many of the task force's recommendations informed the 9/11 Commission Report and were later incorporated in executive orders and legislation.

Stevens is a member of the Council on Foreign Relations. From 1995 to 1998, he chaired the American Bar Association's Standing Committee on Law and National Security.

== President of Investment Company Institute ==
Stevens first joined the Investment Company Institute (ICI) in 1993, serving as the organization's general counsel until 1997. He was then general counsel for mutual funds and international enterprise at Charles Schwab & Co. in San Francisco from 1997 to 1999, and a partner in the Financial Services Group at the Washington D.C. law firm of Dechert LLP from 1999 to 2004.

On June 1, 2004, Stevens rejoined the ICI as its president, replacing Matthew Fink, who retired after 33 years with the organization. During his tenure, he has led ICI's efforts on a number of issues. He has stressed ICI's role in promoting ethical behavior within the industry, testifying before the U.S. Senate that ICI has "said loudly and clearly from the very beginning, if any member, any participant in this industry has violated the law, they should have the book thrown at them."

Since the 2008 financial crisis, he has led ICI's work surrounding money market fund reform, as well as the passage and implementation of the 2010 Dodd-Frank Act, which was passed with the intent of making the U.S. financial system more transparent and accountable to avoid another economic crisis. He also is a very vocal proponent of investment funds and defined contribution plans as a means for providing for retirement savings. As a part of this, he is an advocate of the 401(k), although he has stressed that the program isn't perfect and can be improved.

He also directed the 2011 launch of ICI Global, an expansion that seeks to advance common interests and promote public understanding of issues related to international funds, managers and investors, including both regulated U.S. and non-U.S. based funds publicly offered to investors worldwide. He has been vocally critical of financial transaction taxes, both in the United States and abroad.

== Associations and affiliations ==
Stevens serves on the board of directors of ICI Mutual Insurance Co. He is a member of the executive board of the Boy Scouts of America's National Capital Area Council. He is also member of the financial committee of the Catholic Diocese of Arlington, VA. He is a member of the board of directors for the Franciscan Monastery of the Holy Land, as well as a member of the Life Guard Society of Historic Mount Vernon.

He has been a member of the board of advisers at the Morin Center for Banking and Financial Law at Boston University Law School, and was a member of Yale College's University Librarian's Development Council. In the fall of 1990, he was resident in Tokyo as a US-Japan Leadership Fellow.

== Congressional testimony ==
Stevens has testified before Congress on a number of fund-related issues, including financial stability and economic growth, money market funds, the Volcker Rule, market stability and investor confidence, and strengthening worker retirement security.

== Bibliography ==
- "Room for 'Maneuver': Some Policy Issues in the Iran-Conra Affair", Paul Schott Stevens, Houston Journal of International Law, 1988
- "The National Security Council: Past and Prologue", Paul Schott Stevens, Strategic Review, 1989
- "The Reagan NSC: Before and After", Paul Schott Stevens, Perspectives on Political Science, 1990
- "Mutual Funds, Investment Advisers, and the National Securities Markets Improvement Act", Paul S. Stevens and Craig S. Tyle, The Business Lawyer, 1997
- U.S. Armed Forces and Homeland Defense: The Legal Framework, Paul Schott Stevens, CSIS, 2001
- "Patriotic Acts: Financial Institutions and the War Against Terrorism", Paul Schott Stevens and Thomas C. Bogle, Annual Review of Banking Law, 2002
- "The Just Demands of Peace and Security: International Law and the Case Against Iraq", Paul Schott Stevens, Andru E. Wall, Ata Dinlenc, The Federalist Society for Law and Public Policy Studies, 2002

== Personal life ==
Stevens and his wife, Joyce Stevens (formerly Pilz), live in Alexandria, Virginia. They have four sons.
