= Winton Group =

British investment management firm

Winton Group, Ltd
- Type: Private
- Industry: Hedge fund
- Founded: February 1997; 29 years ago
- Founder: David Harding
- Headquarters: London, England
- Revenue: ▼£265 million (2017) ▼£267 million (2016)
- AUM: US$ 10 billion (as of late 2023)
- Number of employees: 175 (2023)
- Website: www.winton.com

Winton Group (including Winton Capital Management) is a British investment management firm founded by David Harding. In the United States, Winton Group is registered with the Securities and Exchange Commission as an investment advisor and with the Commodity Futures Trading Commission as a CTA, and is authorised by the Financial Conduct Authority in the UK.

The company trades on more than 100 global futures markets in a wide variety of asset classes and on global equity markets. The firm was launched with $1.6 million in 1997, reached a peak of $28.5 billion in assets under advisement, before dropping to $7.3 billion by late 2020.

Winton Group has six offices around the world: London, New York, Hong Kong, Shanghai, Sydney, and Abu Dhabi.

== History ==
=== Early years ===
In 1996, investment manager David Harding left Man AHL (formerly Adam, Harding and Lueck), a systematic managed futures fund and created Winton. Using Harding's middle name, the firm began trading in October 1997. Winton employs statisticians, engineers and physicists, to pursue investment strategies based on scientific research and analysis. According to Harding, Winton had difficulty attracting clients as a commodity trading advisor (CTA), because investors preferred hedge fund strategies that focused on the equity market rather than futures contracts. However, using fees that were different from industry standards, the firm was able to secure investors.

=== Company milestones ===
- In 2005, the firm launched the Winton Evolution Fund, which was designed as a multi-strategy fund investing in a variety of financial instruments and securities.
- In July 2007, Petershill Fund, a private equity fund set up by Goldman Sachs Asset Management International, acquired a 9.99% stake in Winton.
- In 2007, Winton was ranked as the third largest CTA by the industry journal Absolute Return.
- In 2007 it became founding member of the Hedge Fund Standards Board, which sets a voluntary code of standard of best practice endorsed by its members.
- In 2008, Winton was named Real Business's "most profitable" company and was ranked the third largest private finance company in Britain by The Daily Telegraph.
- In late 2008, the company opened offices in Hong Kong, their first outside of the UK.
- In 2010, the company launched the Winton Global Equity Fund which received UCITS approval in Europe.
- In September 2012, Winton became research consultants with Fortune SG Fund Management of Shanghai to help develop China's first managed futures fund.
- In 2013, media coverage reported that the firm's founder had paid nearly £521 million in British taxes since 2006, including £133 million in 2011 alone.
- In 2014 the company opened offices in New York, Sydney, and Tokyo. Shanghai offices followed in 2015.
- In 2016, Winton's San Francisco office opened.
- Also in 2016, Petershill Fund sold its stake in Winton to Affiliated Managers Group, and Winton changed the name of its holding company from Winton Capital Management to Winton Group.
- In 2018, Hivemind Technologies Ltd., a software company that specialises in creating structured data, spun out from Winton.

== Organization ==
=== Operations ===
David Harding is the company's founder and chief executive officer. Approximately 70% of the firm's employees own shares or share options in the company. Winton employs approximately 175 staff members.

More than 100 of the firm's employees are academics doing mathematical research and studying statistical relationships and trading patterns. These specialists are organized into research teams, which peer review and test new strategies, gather data and identify trends. While quant hedge funds broadly have struggled for several years just following the 2008 financial crisis, Winton remains a top recruit of quantitative minds.

The majority of the firm's clients reside outside the UK and many are from the United States.

=== Investment strategy ===
Since its inception, Winton has traded as a commodity trading advisor (CTA). It is regulated by the Commodity Futures Trading Commission as a CTA and by the Financial Conduct Authority in the UK. Winton is also registered with the U.S. Securities and Exchange Commission as an investment advisor.

The firm refers to itself as a "modern investment management company" and employs managed futures strategies using data analysis and modelling to follow trends in global futures markets such as commodities and bonds. After establishing the Winton Evolution Fund and Winton Global Equity Strategy, the firm began offering multi-strategy and equity investment programs that invest in equity markets around the world.

Winton uses research and quantitative data analysis to identify favourable trends in the market and its focus on research differentiates it from its industry companions. In recent years, Winton has further developed its statistical research, focusing on big data; according to the Financial Times, in 2013 its machines processed "the equivalent of 30m King James bibles' worth of information every day". In April 2013, Winton was featured in the BBC2 program Horizon: The Age of Big Data for its use of scientific analysis of data, particularly for its capture and processing of large data sets including historical data for the markets that it trades in and newly produced data from thousands of companies.

Winton's trading is automated and systematic and uses computer algorithms to trade futures in financial assets including equities, currencies, bonds, commodities, livestock and energy in over 100 futures markets worldwide. Winton uses a mix of long-term and short-term trading as part of its strategy and combines uncorrelated strategies to maximize their risk-return ratio. According to the firm, it uses the same mathematical tools, for research, statistical data analysis, stock selection, and futures investments. From around 2008, the Winton Fund has increased its allocation to cash equities.

=== Assets under advisement ===
When Winton launched in October 1997, it held $1.6 million in assets. Over the next 3 years the assets held by the firm grew to over $150 million at the end of 2000. By 2004, the firm's seventh year in operation, its assets under advisement reached $1 billion. In the mid-to-late 2000s, the firm experienced large inflows of capital, leading to its assets under advisement increasing rapidly from $4.8 billion in mid-2006, to $12.4 billion in 2009. Between 2010 and 2012, Winton's total assets under advisement increased by almost $15 billion, from $13.7 billion in June 2010 to $28.5 billion in February 2012. As at December 2017, Winton's assets under advisement totaled $28.5 billion. Following a year of significant losses, including more than 20% in their main fund, Winton's assets under advisement dropped to $7.3 billion by late 2020.
