= Commodity broker =

Agent facilitating trades in commodity markets

A commodity broker is a firm or an individual who executes orders to buy or sell commodity contracts on behalf of the clients and charges them a commission. A firm or individual who trades for his own account is called a trader. Commodity contracts include futures, options, and similar financial derivatives. Clients who trade commodity contracts are either hedgers using the derivatives markets to manage risk, or speculators who are willing to assume that risk from hedgers in hopes of a profit.

== History ==
Historically, commodity brokers traded grain and livestock futures contracts. Today, commodity brokers trade a wide variety of financial derivatives based on not only grain and livestock, but also derivatives based on foods/softs, metals, energy, stock indexes, equities, bonds, currencies, and an ever growing list of other underlying assets. Ever since the 1980s, the majority of commodity contracts traded are financial derivatives with financial underlying assets such as stock indexes and currencies. Since the implementation of the Volcker rule in 2014, the number of commodity trading houses and individual brokers has dwindled.

A page from the 1869–1870 Macon directory featuring two companies that advertise as commission merchants

== Types ==
Firms and individuals who are often collectively called commodity brokers include:

Floor Broker/Trader: an individual who trades commodity contracts on the floor of a commodities exchange. When executing trades on behalf of a client in exchange for a commission he is acting in the role of a broker. When trading on behalf of his own account, or for the account of his employer, he is acting in the role of a trader. Floor trading is conducted in the pits of a commodity exchange via open outcry. A floor broker is different from a "floor trader". The floor trader also works on the floor of the exchange but makes trades as a principal for his or her own account or for the floor trader's firm.

Futures Commission Merchant (FCM): a firm or individual that solicits or accepts orders for commodity contracts traded on an exchange and holds client funds to margin, similar to a securities broker-dealer. Most individual traders do not work directly with a FCM, but rather through an IB or CTA.

Introducing Broker (IB): a firm or individual that solicits or accepts orders for commodity contracts traded on an exchange. IBs do not actually hold customer funds to margin. Client funds to margin are held by a FCM associated with the IB.

Commodity Trading Advisor (CTA): a firm or individual that, for compensation or profit, advises others, on the trading of commodity contracts. They advise commodity pools and offer managed futures accounts. Like an IB, a CTA does not hold customer funds to margin; they are held at a FCM. CTAs exercise discretion over their clients' accounts, meaning that they have power of attorney to trade the clients account on his behalf according to the client's trading objectives. A CTA is generally the commodity equivalent to a financial advisor or mutual fund manager.

Commodity Pool Operator (CPO): a firm or individual that operates commodity pools advised by a CTA. A commodity pool is essentially the commodity equivalent to a mutual fund.

Registered Commodity Representative (RCR)/Associated Person (AP): an employee, partner or officer of a FCM, IB, CTA, or CPO, duly registered and licensed to conduct the activities of a FCM, IB, CTA, or CPO. This is the commodity equivalent to a registered representative.

== Regulation ==
A single firm or individual may be registered and act in more than one capacity.

In the United States, an individual working in any of the above roles must pass the Series 3 National Commodity Futures Examination administered by the Financial Industry Regulatory Authority (FINRA). With few exceptions, most individuals who act as a FCM, IB, CTA, and CPO, as well as their RCR/APs, are required to register with the Commodity Futures Trading Commission (CFTC), and be members of the National Futures Association (NFA). Floor brokers/traders who are members or employees of a commodity exchange generally do not need to be members of the NFA, as they are regulated by the exchange.

== Exchanges ==
Commodity brokers can trade commodities on various exchanges, which specialize in trading a certain commodity type. The common commodity exchanges include the New York Mercantile Exchange (NYMEX) that trades in a variety of commodities, Chicago Board of Trade (CBOT) that trades in wheat, rice, soybeans, oats, corn, silver, gold, and ethanol, and the Intercontinental Exchange (ICE) that trades in crude oil, electricity, and natural gas. Others include the CME Group, Kansas City Board of Trade, London International Financial Futures and Options Exchange, and the New York Board of Trade.

== See also ==
- Broker – Person who arranges transactions between a buyer and a seller for a commission
- Commodities exchange
- Commodity (type of good) – Fungible item produced to satisfy wants or needs
- Derivative (finance) – Type of financial contract
- Futures contract – Standardised contract to buy or sell an asset at a future date
- Hedge (finance) – Investment position used to offset potential losses in another asset
- Hedge fund – Privately pooled investment fund using diverse strategies to seek high returns
- Option (finance) – Right to buy or sell a certain thing at a later date at an agreed price
- Speculation – Engaging in risky financial transactions
