= Jaffray Woodriff =

American businessman

Jaffray Piers Woodriff (born April 8, 1969, in Virginia) is the co-founder and CEO of Quantitative Investment Management (QIM), a $1 billion hedge fund. Woodriff founded QIM with Michael Geismar and Greyson Williams in 2003. Woodriff attended the University of Virginia from 1987 to 1991.

QIM is run out of Woodriff's hometown of Charlottesville, Virginia. Woodriff uses a "Black Box" statistical approach to making investing decisions.

Forbes listed Woodriff as one of the highest-paid fund managers in 2011. In 2012 Jack Schwager's book "Hedge Fund Market Wizards" profiled Woodriff as one of the top hedge fund managers in the world at that time. Woodriff has been critical of stock market structure exploited by high-frequency trading on his Twitter account.

== Personal life ==
Jaffray Woodriff has been honored with a U.S. Squash Special Recognition Award for his leadership and substantial contributions to the sport of squash in the U.S.A. The building of the University of Virginia's McArthur Squash Center at Boar's Head Sports Club, where the U.S. Squash Championships was held, was made possible by donating $12.4 million from the Quantitative Foundation, where Woodriff serves as a trustee.

In 2016, Woodriff began partnering with SP@CE, an "innovation infrastructure" based in Charlottesville, Virginia, and in 2017 announced he would implement SP@CE's plans to build a 140,000 sq. ft. "innovation hub" to support local technology companies and the incubation and development of startup companies.

Woodriff's Quantitative Foundation donated $120 million to the University of Virginia in 2019 to create a School of Data Science. The gift is the largest of its kind that the university has ever received.

== Controversy ==
In 2017 and 2018, Woodriff was involved in a legal dispute over allegations that Woodriff proceeded with implementing SP@CE's planned Charlottesville innovation hub without further involvement by SP@CE, in breach of an agreement to grant the founder of SP@CE an ownership interest in the project.
