= Commodity pool =

A commodity pool is an investment structure where many individual investors combine their moneys and trade in futures contracts as a single entity in order to gain leverage. They are analogous to mutual funds wherein a fund is similarly set up expressly for trading in equity, except that mutual funds are open to public subscription whereas commodity pools and hedge funds are private.

Commodity pools are also called "managed futures funds". The name "commodity pool" is a National Futures Association (NFA) legal term. In the United States, the Commodity Futures Trading Commission (CFTC) and the NFA, as opposed to the Securities and Exchange Commission, regulate commodity pools.

Many hedge funds are commodity pools. Funds that trade in commodities, which include many of the largest funds engaged in macro-strategies, are registered with the Commodity Futures Trading Commission as commodity pools and as commodity trading advisors (CTAs). In an address to the Securities Industry Association in 2004, Sharon Brown-Hruska, acting director of the CFTC, said that 65 of the top 100 funds in 2003 were commodity pools, and 50 out of the 100 largest hedge funds were CTAs in addition to being commodity pools.

== See also ==
- List of traded commodities
- Managed futures account
