= Swing trading =

Speculative trading strategy

Swing trading is a speculative trading strategy in financial markets where a tradable asset is held for one or more days in an effort to profit from price changes or swings. A swing trading position is typically held longer than a day trading position, but shorter than buy-and-hold investment strategies that can be held for months or years. Profits can be sought by either buying an asset or short selling. Momentum signals (e.g., 52-week high/low) have been shown to be used by financial analysts in their buy and sell recommendations that can be applied in swing trading.

== Swing trading methods ==
Using a set of mathematically based objective rules for buying and selling is a common method for swing traders to eliminate the subjectivity, emotional aspects, and labor-intensive analysis of swing trading. The trading rules can be used to create a trading algorithm or "trading system" using technical analysis or fundamental analysis to give buy and sell signals.

Simpler rule-based trading approaches include Alexander Elder's strategy, which measures the behavior of an instrument's price trend using three different moving averages of closing prices. The instrument is only traded Long when the three averages are aligned in an upward direction, and only traded Short when the three averages are moving downward. Trading algorithms and systems may lose their profit potential when they obtain enough of a mass following to curtail their effectiveness: "Now it's an arms race. Everyone is building more sophisticated algorithms, and the more competition exists, the smaller the profits," observes Andrew Lo, the Director of the Laboratory for Financial Engineering, for the Massachusetts Institute of Technology.

Identifying when to enter and when to exit a trade is the primary challenge for all swing trading strategies. However, swing traders do not need perfect timing—to buy at the bottom and sell at the top of price oscillations—to make a profit. Small consistent earnings that involve strict money management rules can compound returns over time.

== See also ==
- Dow theory
- Trend following
