= Trend following trading =

Trading strategy

Trend following or trend trading is a trading strategy according to which one should buy an asset when its price trend goes up, and sell when its trend goes down, expecting price movements to continue.

There are a number of different techniques, calculations and time-frames that may be used to determine the general direction of the market to generate a trade signal, including the current market price calculation, moving averages and channel breakouts. Traders who employ this strategy do not aim to forecast or predict specific price levels; they simply jump on the trend and ride it. Due to the different techniques and time frames employed by trend followers to identify trends, trend followers as a group are not always strongly correlated to one another.

Trend following is used by commodity trading advisors (CTAs) as the predominant strategy of technical traders. Research done by Galen Burghardt has shown that between 2000-2009 there was a very high correlation (.97) between trend following CTAs and the broader CTA index.

== Definition ==
Trend following is an investment or trading strategy which tries to take advantage of long, medium or short-term moves that seem to play out in various markets. Traders who employ a trend following strategy do not aim to forecast or predict specific price levels; they simply jump on the trend (when they perceive that a trend has established with their own particular reasons or rules) and ride it. These traders normally enter in the market after the trend "properly" establishes itself, betting that the trend will persist for a long time, and for this reason they forego the initial turning point profit. A market "trend" is a tendency of a financial market price to move in a particular direction over time. If there is a turn contrary to the trend, they exit and wait until the turn establishes itself as a trend in the opposite direction. In case their rules signal an exit, the traders exit but re-enter when the trend re-establishes.

Some traders may exit the market when they perceive a downtrend in order to minimize losses and to avoid becoming ‘trapped’ in a stock that has fallen well below their held cost average. Conversely, traders may "let the profits run" when the market trend goes as expected until exhausted, at which point profits are taken. Some traders may set a specific stop limit or sell once a certain return has been met, or sell at a point once unrealized profits begin diminishing as a stock falls back down.

This trading or "betting with positive edge" method involves a risk management component that uses three elements: number of shares or futures held, the current market price, and current market volatility. An initial risk rule determines position size at time of entry. Exactly how much to buy or sell is based on the size of the trading account and the volatility of the issue. Changes in price may lead to a gradual reduction or an increase of the initial trade. On the other hand, adverse price movements may lead to an exit from the entire trade.

In the words of Tom Basso, in the book Trade Your Way to Financial Freedom

Let's break down the term Trend Following into its components. The first part is "trend". Every trader needs a trend to make money. If you think about it, no matter what the technique, if there is not a trend after you buy, then you will not be able to sell at higher prices..."Following" is the next part of the term. We use this word because trend followers always wait for the trend to shift first, then "follow" it.

The key reasons for trending markets are a number of behavioral biases that cause market participants to over-react:

Herding: After markets have trended, some traders jump on the bandwagon, and thus prolonging the herding effect and trends.

Confirmation Bias: People tend to look for information that confirm their views and beliefs. This can lead investors to buy assets that have recently made money, and sell assets that have declined, causing trends to continue.

Risk Management: Some risk-management models will sell in down markets as, for example, some risk budgets have been breached, and buy in up markets as new risk budgets have been unlocked, causing trends to persist.

"Don't fight the tape" is a term that means do not bet or trade against the trend in the financial markets, i.e., if the broad market is moving up, do not bet on a downward move. The term "tape" refers to the ticker tape used to transmit the price of stocks. It is analogous to the trader's maxim, "The trend is your friend."

== Considerations ==
- Price: One of the first rules of trend following is that price is the main concern. Traders may use other indicators showing where price may go next or what it should be but as a general rule these should be disregarded. A trader need only be worried about what the market is doing, not what the market might do. The current price and only the price tells you what the market is doing.
- Money management: Another decisive factor of trend following is not the timing of the trade or the indicator, but rather the decision of how much to trade over the course of the trend.
- Risk control: Cut losses is the rule. This means that during periods of higher market volatility, the trading size is reduced. During losing periods, positions are reduced and trade size is cut back. The main objective is to preserve capital until more positive price trends reappear.
- Rules: Trend following should be systematic. Price and time are pivotal at all times. This technique is not based on an analysis of fundamental supply and demand factors.
- Diversification: Research published by hedge fund manager Andreas Clenow shows that cross asset diversification is an essential part of professional trend following.

== Example ==
A trader would identify a security to trade (currencies/commodities/financials) and would come up with a preliminary strategy, such as:

- Commodity: soybean oil
- Trading approach: long and short alternately.
- Entrance: When the 50 period simple moving average (SMA) crosses over the 100 period SMA, go long when the market opens. The crossover suggests that the trend has recently turned up.
- Exit: Exit long and go short the next day when 100 period SMA crosses over 50 period SMA. The crossover suggests that the trend has turned down.
- Stop loss: Set a stop loss based on maximum loss acceptable. For example, if the recent, say 10-day, average true range is 0.5% of current market price, stop loss could be set at 4x0.5% = 2%. Conventional wisdom on stop losses set the risk per trade anywhere between 1%-5% of capital for a single trade; this risk varies from one trader to another.

The trader would then backtest the strategy, using actual data and would evaluate the strategy. The simulator would generate estimated number of trades, the fraction of winning/losing trades, average profit/loss, average holding time, maximum drawdown, and the overall profit/loss. The trader can then experiment and refine the strategy. Care must be taken, however, to avoid over-optimization.

It is possible that a majority of the trades may be unprofitable, but by "cutting the losses" and "letting profits run", the overall strategy may be profitable. Trend trading is most effective for a market that is quiet (relative low volatility) and trending. For this reason, trend traders often focus on commodities, which show a stronger tendency to trend than on stocks, which are more likely to be mean reverting (which favors swing traders).

In addition to quiet low volatility markets, where trend following strategies perform well, trend trading is also very effective in high volatility markets (market crash). Trend traders "short" the market and benefit from the downside market trend.

== See also ==
- Algorithmic trading
- Day trading
- Swing trading

Related phenomena:

- Business cycle
- Chart pattern
- Herd behavior
- Mean reversion (finance)
