= Board of Trade of City of Chicago v. Olsen =

- Supreme Court of the United States

Argued February 26, 1923 Decided April 16, 1923
- Full case name: Board of Trade of City of Chicago, et al. v. Olsen, U.S. Atty., et al.
- Citations: 262 U.S. 1 (more) 43 S. Ct. 470; 67 L. Ed. 839

Case history
- Prior: Bill in equity dismissed, N.D. Ill.

Holding
- The Grain Futures Act did not exceed the powers of Congress under the Commerce Clause.

Court membership
- Chief Justice William H. Taft Associate Justices Joseph McKenna · Oliver W. Holmes Jr. Willis Van Devanter · James C. McReynolds; Louis Brandeis · George Sutherland; Pierce Butler · Edward T. Sanford

Case opinions
- Majority: Taft, joined by McKenna, Holmes, Van Devanter, Brandeis, Butler
- Dissent: McReynolds, Sutherland

Laws applied
- U.S. Const. art. I, sec. 8, cl. 3; 42 Stat. 998, c. 369 (Grain Futures Act)

Board of Trade of City of Chicago v. Olsen, 262 U.S. 1 (1923), is a United States Supreme Court decision in which the Court upheld the Grain Futures Act as constitutional under the Commerce Clause of the United States Constitution.
