= Grain Futures Act =

United States federal law

- Other short titles: Grain Futures Act of 1922; Grain Standards Act
- Long title: A bill for the prevention and removal of obstructions and burdens upon interstate commerce in grain, by regulating transactions on grain future exchanges, and for other purposes.
- Enacted by: the 67th United States Congress
- Effective: September 21, 1922

Citations
- Public law: 67-331
- Statutes at Large: 42 Stat. 998

Codification
- Titles amended: 7 U.S.C.: Agriculture
- U.S.C. sections amended: 7 U.S.C. ch. 1 § 1

Legislative history
- Introduced in the House as H.R. 11843 by Jasper N. Tincher (R-KS) on June 1, 1922; Committee consideration by House Agriculture Committee, Senate Agriculture and Forestry Committee; Passed the House on June 27, 1922 (211-76); Signed into law by President Warren G. Harding on September 21, 1922

United States Supreme Court cases
- Board of Trade of City of Chicago v. Olsen, 262 U.S. 1 (1923)

The Grain Futures Act (ch. 369, 42 Stat. 998, 7 U.S.C. § 1) is a United States federal law enacted September 21, 1922 involving the regulation of trading in certain commodity futures, and causing the establishment of the Grain Futures Administration, a predecessor organization to the Commodity Futures Trading Commission.

The bill that became the Grain Futures Act was introduced in the United States Congress two weeks after the US Supreme Court declared the Futures Trading Act of 1921 unconstitutional in Hill v. Wallace 259 U.S. 44 (1922). The Grain Futures Act was held to be constitutional by the US Supreme Court in Board of Trade of City of Chicago v. Olsen 262 US 1 (1923).

In 1936 it was revised into the Commodity Exchange Act (CEA). The act was further superseded in 1974 by establishing the Commodity Futures Trading Commission. In 1982 the Commodity Futures Trading Commission created the National Futures Association (NFA).

== See also ==
- National Futures Association
- Commodity Exchange Act
- Commodity Futures Trading Commission
- Futures exchange
- Futures contract
