= Investment Company Institute =

Industry-owned regulated investment fund organization

- Formation: 1940
- Purpose: To encourage adherence to ethical standards by industry participants; advance the interests of funds, their shareholders, directors, and investment advisers; and promote public understanding of mutual funds and other investment companies.
- Location: Washington, DC
- Chair: Andrew R. Schlossberg
- Vice Chairman: George H. Walker
- President and CEO: Eric J. Pan
- Main organ: Board of governors
- Website: www.ici.org
- Formerly called: National Association of Investment Companies

The Investment Company Institute (ICI) is a global association of regulated funds, including mutual funds, exchange-traded funds, closed-end funds, and unit investment trusts in the United States, and similar funds offered to investors in jurisdictions worldwide. ICI encourages adherence to ethical standards, promotes public financial literacy about funds and investing, and advances the interests of investment funds and their shareholders, directors, and advisers.

== History ==
Following the stock market crash of 1929 that presaged the Great Depression, Congress passed a series of acts related to securities and financial regulation. One of these, the Investment Company Act of 1940, clearly defined the responsibilities of investment companies. This same year, what would become ICI was established in New York as the National Committee of Investment Companies, an organization to aid in the administration of the act. It became the National Association of Investment Companies (NAIC) in 1941, and then the Investment Company Institute in 1961.

=== ICI Global ===
In 2011, ICI expanded internationally with the launch of the London-based ICI Global, which seeks to advance the interests of international funds, managers, and investors, including both regulated U.S. and non-regulated U.S. based funds publicly offered to investors worldwide. In 2013, ICI Global expanded into Asian markets with the opening of an office in Hong Kong, and in 2020, ICI opened an office in Brussels.

== Role in regulation and education ==
As an association made up of U.S. investment companies, including mutual funds, closed-end funds, exchange-traded funds (ETFs), and unit investment trusts (UITs), ICI encourages adherence to ethical standards among its members. It advocates for meaningful disclosure for investors from funds and provides investor education. It also provides data and commentary to the SEC to advise its regulatory process and submits official comment letters and briefs in response to proposals around new financial regulations as well as legal decisions.

ICI's research department includes economists and research analysts who collect and disseminate data on all types of registered investment companies; in 2020, they released more than 300 statistical reports examining various aspects of the industry, as well as 20 research and policy publications. In addition, ICI aims to promote the interests of directors, stockholders, and investment counselors as well as the investment funds themselves. The organization has two continuing professional education programs, including a Continuing Professional Education (CPE) program for Certified Public Accountants and a Continuing Legal Education (CLE) program for attorneys.

== Political role ==
ICI lobbies on behalf of investment companies and sometimes advocates directly to the public on issues important to its members. It also donates to federal candidates through its political action committee. ICI PAC raised $1,676,728, plus $947,200 more, directly for federal candidates during the 2020 election cycle, supporting the reelection of 222 lawmakers on both sides of the aisle.

== Membership ==
ICI membership is open to Securities and Exchange Commission-registered investment companies (mutual funds, closed-end funds, ETFs, and UITs), their investment advisers, and underwriters, as well as investment managers sponsoring regulated funds offered to investors in jurisdictions worldwide. As of September 2020, ICI membership included 8,669 mutual funds, 5,426 closed-end funds, 1,775 exchange-traded funds (ETFs), and 3,262 unit investment trusts (UITs) in the United States, and 17,524 non-U.S. funds. As of January 2022, ICI's members manage total assets of US$32.3 trillion in the United States, serving more than 100 million U.S. shareholders, and US$9.6 trillion in assets in other jurisdictions.

== Leadership ==
ICI is run by a board of governors, responsible for setting policies and overseeing the activities of the organization. The organization's staff is based in its offices in Washington, DC, London, Hong Kong, and Brussels.
