= Commodity Exchange Act =

1936 federal law regulating commodities trading

- Other short titles: Commodity Exchange Act of 1936
- Long title: An Act to amend the grain futures act to prevent and remove obstructions and burdens upon interstate commerce in grains and other commodities by regulating transactions therein on commodity futures exchanges, to limit or abolish short selling, to curb manipulation, and for other purposes.
- Enacted by: the 74th United States Congress
- Effective: June 15, 1936

Citations
- Public law: 74-675
- Statutes at Large: 49 Stat. 1491

Codification
- Titles amended: 7 U.S.C.: Agriculture
- U.S.C. sections created: 7 U.S.C. ch. 1 § 1

Legislative history
- Introduced in the House as H.R. 6772; Committee consideration by Senate Agriculture and Forestry Committee; Passed the Senate on May 29, 1936 (62-16); Signed into law by President Franklin D. Roosevelt on June 15, 1936

Major amendments
- Dodd–Frank Wall Street Reform and Consumer Protection Act; Economic Growth, Regulatory Relief and Consumer Protection Act

Commodity Exchange Act (ch. 545, 49 Stat. 1491, enacted June 15, 1936) is a federal act enacted in 1936 by the U.S. government, with some of its provisions amending the Grain Futures Act of 1922.

The act provides federal regulation of all commodities and futures trading activities and requires all futures and commodity options to be traded on organized exchanges. In 1974, the Commodity Futures Trading Commission (CFTC) was created as a result of the Commodity Exchange Act, and in 1982 the National Futures Association (NFA) was created by CFTC.

== See also ==
- Grain Futures Act
- National Futures Association
- Commodity Futures Trading Commission
- Futures exchange
- Futures contract
- Commodity Futures Modernization Act of 2000
