= National Futures Association =

United States self-regulatory organization for derivatives

National Futures Association (NFA)
- Founded: 1982
- Headquarters: 320 South Canal, #2400, Chicago, IL 60606
- Key people: Thomas W. Sexton, President, CEO; Alicia Crighton, Chair
- Products: Registration Screening, Rulemaking, Rule Compliance, Rules Enforcement, Member Education, Market Regulation, Investor Protection, Investor Resources, Investor Outreach, Dispute Resolution, Arbitration
- Website: www.nfa.futures.org

The National Futures Association (NFA) is the self-regulatory organization (SRO) for the U.S. derivatives industry, including on-exchange traded futures, retail off-exchange foreign currency (forex), and over-the-counter (OTC) derivatives (swaps). NFA is headquartered in Chicago and maintains an office in New York City. NFA is a non-profit, independent regulatory organization. NFA does not operate any markets and is not a trade association. NFA is financed from membership dues and assessment fees, and membership is mandatory for many market participants.

== History ==
NFA was created by the Commodity Futures Trading Commission (CFTC) in September 1981 and began regulatory operations in 1982.

== Responsibilities ==
NFA's chief responsibilities include registering firms and individuals who want to do business in the derivatives industry, monitoring trades in that industry, creating rules and best practices, taking disciplinary actions against members who don't follow the rules, providing member education (through workshops, webinars and conferences), mediating member and customer disputes, and providing investor education and protection.

== Member News and Notices ==
One of the NFA's main functions is to provide up-to-date information to all members, subscribers, investors and the regulators. The NFA News section provides links to information on NFA enforcement actions, press releases, notices to members, updated rule submissions, testimonies and more.

== Governance ==
The NFA is governed by a board of directors. The board meets four times a year. NFA's board also selects individuals to serve on NFA Committees.

== External Articles ==
- New Outsourced Compliance Guidance – Implications for CFTC-Registered Private Fund Managers at JDSupra
- July 7, 2021: NFA Adopts CPO Reporting Requirement for Distress Events: Compliance Rule 2-50 in effect as of June 30, 2021
