= Peter Borish =

American investor

Peter F. Borish
- Education: B.A. (Economics), University of Michigan (1981); M.A. (Public Policy), the Gerald R. Ford School of Public Policy at the University of Michigan (1982)
- Occupations: Investor and trader
- Employers: Computer Trading Corporation (chairman and CEO); Charitybuzz (founding investor)
- Known for: Founding partner and second-in-command at Tudor Investment Corporation; Chairman of OneChicago, LLC; Chairman of the Foundation for the Study of Cycles; Founding board member of the Robin Hood Foundation; Founding board member of Math for America.
- Spouse: Julie Borish

Peter Borish is chairman and CEO of Computer Trading Corporation (CTC), an investment and advisory firm. Borish sits on the board of CIBC Bank USA. He is an investor and advisor to Citrini as well as an independent director on the board of RMB Funds.

Previously, through CTC, Borish was chief strategist of Quad Group and its affiliated companies. In his role, Borish was engaged in recruiting new talent for Quad and working with the founding partners on business strategy. In addition, he helped traders develop a methodology to enhance their performance by serving as a trading coach. Borish is chairman and CEO of Computer Trading Corporation (CTC), and a current investor and advisor to 444 Capital.

Borish is also a founding investor in Charitybuzz.

Borish formerly worked at the Federal Reserve Bank of New York, was founding partner and second-in-command at Tudor Investment Corporation, was chairman of OneChicago, LLC, and was chairman of the non-profits Foundation for the Study of Cycles and The Institute for Financial Markets.

He is also a founding board member of both the Robin Hood Foundation and Math for America.

== Education ==
Peter Borish earned a B.A. in economics from the University of Michigan in 1981. He also earned an M.A. in public policy from the Gerald R. Ford School of Public Policy at the University of Michigan in 1982.

== Career ==
Peter Borish has served as the Chief Strategist of Quad Group LLC, an investment management firm, since 2013. Additionally, Borish has served as the president and CEO of Computer Trading Corporation, an actively managed fund focused on macroeconomic investing, since 1995, where he created the trade and risk management models his company uses to manage assets in the derivatives market. Borish also served as the CEO and member of the board of Twinfields Capital Management, a global macro hedge fund focused on the fixed income sector, from 2005 to 2008. Borish was a founding partner of Tudor Investment Corporation, a global investment firm, where he served as the director of research from 1985 to 1994.

In addition to the foregoing leadership positions, Borish has also served as a board advisor of ValueStream Labs, an accelerator for financial services technologies, since 2013 and as a trustee of RMB Investors Trust, an open-end management investment company since 2015.

Borish has engaged in substantial philanthropy and nonprofit work, having helped found, and, since 1988, having served on the board of directors of, the Robin Hood Foundation, which funds New York City educational projects for disadvantaged children. Additionally, since 1991, Borish has been a trustee of the Institute for Financial Markets (IFM), a nonprofit dedicated to participating in the development of standards and fostering best practices initiatives in the financial services industry. From 2006 until 2013, Borish served as a member of the board of directors at Charitybuzz, a charitable initiative raising funds through auctions featuring celebrity encounters. Borish was also a member of the board of the Futures Industry Association. and he also served as special advisor to the board of directors of the Chicago Board of Trade. In addition, Borish was also a member Market Risk Advisory Committee of the Commodity Futures Trading Commission (CFTC) during the pandemic.

Borish's career began at the Federal Reserve Bank of New York in 1982, where he monitored foreign exchange futures and options until 1985.

== Philanthropy ==
Borish is a founding board member of the Robin Hood Foundation (along with Paul Tudor Jones and Glenn Dubin), a charitable organization that attempts to alleviate problems caused by poverty in New York City. He is also a founding board member of Math for America, a nonprofit organization that seeks to improve mathematics education in United States public schools.

He is also a mayoral appointee to the New York City Department of Youth & Community Development

== Personal life ==
He is married to Julie Borish.
