= Investment outsourcing =

Outsourcing of Investment Management responsibilities

Investment outsourcing is the process whereby institutional investors and high-net-worth families engage a third party to manage all or a portion of their investment portfolio. This arrangement can include functions such as establishing the asset allocation, selecting investment managers, implementing portfolio decisions (both strategic and tactical), providing on-going oversight, performing risk management and other areas of portfolio management. Investment outsourcing goes by many names including fiduciary management, outsourced chief investment officer (OCIO), CIO in a box, and implemented consulting.

Outsourced investment management is a large and growing market segment with over a trillion dollars currently managed by outsourced managers. According to a survey of outsourcers by aiCIO magazine, the volume of outsourced assets increased 200% between 2007 and 2011.

The outsourcing trend began with smaller institutions that could not or did not want to build an internal investment team. According to a study by the Family Wealth Alliance, approximately four in ten wealthy families have outsourced discretionary investment authority. The trend is even clearer among families with less than $500 million in assets where two-thirds have outsourced management. Similarly, just 11% of college endowments between $100 and $500 million internally manage their portfolios and instead rely on outsourced managers. Increasingly, however, it is not just small investors seeking to outsource. There has been a marked increase in the number of multibillion outsourcing engagements since the 2008 financial crisis as firms grapple with increasing complexity and the need for better risk management.

== History ==
Donald E. Callaghan and Jonathan Hirtle, Chief Executive Officer for Hirtle, Callaghan & Co., pioneered the outsourced Chief Investment Officer (OCIO) model, which serves family groups and organizations that do not employ fully staffed investment departments. For his OCIO innovations, Hirtle has been dubbed the "Oracle of Outsource."

== Outsourcing models ==
The model by which outsourced CIOs service clients is still evolving in this nascent business. One common model is to outsource all decision making including asset allocation, manager selection and monitoring. The OCIO reports back to the client but the burden is largely lifted from the client and placed on the new provider. Among OCIOs utilizing this approach, there is a "continuum of outsourcing approaches and providers: manager-of-manager programs; funds-of-funds; former CIOs offering a diversified model portfolio." The common thread amongst these approaches is the use of commingled funds or model portfolios which creates economies of scale for the OCIO.

A different model is pursued by a growing subset of the OCIO universe. The members of this group work alongside the client's staff – not as a replacement to them. According to investment industry newsletter FundFire, "An increasing number of CIOs see outsourcing not as a threat to their job, but as a source of complementary expertise and advice, as well as investment opportunities." Many of the firms offering this more customized model also offer traditional investment consulting services to institutions and see OCIO as a natural extension of these services. Four of the five largest OCIOs as of March 31, 2019 have roots in investment consulting: Cambridge Associates, Mercer, Russell Investments, and Aon.

== Fees ==
The management fees charged by outsourced managers vary widely based upon a number of factors, but are generally between 0.1% and 1%, with some firms also charging an incentive fee in addition to their base management fee. In a panel discussion organized by CIO magazine, representatives for three different firms discussing the rise in investment outsourcing gave ranges of between 0.25% and 0.65%, with some of the difference explained by the use of internal or proprietary funds or a purely open-architecture approach. In some quarters, discontent has been voiced about investment outsourcing firms which allocate client capital to proprietary products charging a second layer of fees.

== Investment outsourcers by assets ==
The next two tables use data from Charles Skorina & Company's "Ultimate Outsourcer’s List" and is divided into two categories: 1) outsourcers who advise on a diverse set of mandates including pensions, non-profits and family trusts and 2) university endowment-style outsource managers. The list curated by Skorina & Company is more expansive than the other most commonly referenced list prepared by Pensions & Investments (P&I). The P&I list counts only the top 25 and is available only to paid subscribers.

Firm name	Assets under management
Russell Investments	$96.0 billion
SEI	$64.7 billion
Mercer	$51.0 billion
Willis Towers Watson	$50.0 billion
State Street Global Advisors	$41.0 billion
BlackRock	$55.0 billion
Northern Trust	$20.0 billion
Clearbrook Financial	$30.0 billion
Strategic Investment Group	$21.2 billion
PFM Asset Management	$1.6 billion
Hall Capital Partners	$30.0 billion
Morgan Stanley (Graystone Consulting)	$22.0 billion
Hirtle Callaghan	$22.0 billion
NEPC	$17.0 billion
Partners Capital Investment Group	$48.0 billion
Marquette Associates	$13.0 billion
UBS	$12.8 billion
Wilshire Associates	$9.7 billion
Pyramis Global	$6.7 billion
Spruce Private Investors	$3.2 billion
Spider Management Company	$3.1 billion
Angeles Investment Advisors	$2.1 billion
FEG Investment Advisors	$20 billion
Post Rock Advisors	$1.1 billion
Balentine	$1.4 billion
Goldman Sachs	$25.0 billion
JPMorgan Chase	$23.0 billion
Athena Capital Advisors	$5.8 billion
BNY Mellon Asset Management	unknown
Fortress Partners Funds	$1.8 billion
New Providence Asset Management	$2.4 billion
Rockefeller Financial	$10.0 billion
Salient Partners	$17.0 billion
Fiduciary Asset Management	$2.0 billion
SECOR Asset Management	$7.5 billion
Pacific Global Advisors	$20.0 billion
Verger Capital Management	$2.2 billion

== Consultants push into outsourcing ==
In the general investment outsourcing area, where outsourcers serve a variety of clients including pension funds, non-profits and families, the business grew out of investment consulting firms and to a lesser extent large banks and money managers. In the early 1970s, as corporate pension plans were implementing ERISA, investment consulting firms came of age. Large organizations often had both in-house investment staffs and investment committees populated by sophisticated professionals. These groups wanted to make all important decisions themselves, and therefore they looked to the consultants only for recommendations, especially regarding asset allocation and manager selection. "In other words, investment consulting began, and remained for many decades, a non-discretionary, advisory-only model for delivering investment advice. The consultants made recommendations, but the clients decided what to do." Northern Trust was the first firm to offer an outsourced model in 1979 followed a year later by Russell Investments.

Investment consultants have been eager to exit the "largely unsatisfactory, low-margin, and litigious business" and "keen to move into what is perceived as a significantly better business model, where fees are asset-based." These consulting firms typically have large staffs and experience consulting on a large (multibillion-dollar) scale. On the other hand, "critics assert that consultants suffer from a lack of competence as portfolio managers, and that their experience with the administration of a fund is nonexistent." Others have raised concerns about the possibility for conflicts of interests when consultants attempt to move into the outsourced CIO business. British advisory firm Allenbridge Epic, after surveying 11 OCIOs, concluded that several lacked transparency and suffered from conflicts of interest.

== Pension investment outsourcing ==
One of the first institutional scale investment outsourcing arrangements occurred in 1986. Three investment managers who had worked for IBM's pension fund left the company and formed SASCO Capital. They managed a portion of the IBM pension plan but IBM also kept a large portion of the assets and investment team in-house. Another early example of pension fund investment outsourcing involved General Dynamics. In November 1994 General Dynamics became the first client when its treasurer formed a new outsourced investment firm, Fiduciary Asset Management. At the time of General Dynamics’ initial allocation, this was a $2.5 billion mandate. In 2001 another of the early large pension outsourcing arrangements occurred when Xerox hired General Motors Asset Management (GMAM) to manage its $4 billion defined benefit pension plan. This move was prompted, in part, by the departure of two senior Xerox professionals to run other investment plans. As part of the arrangement, Xerox's chief investment officer joined GMAM. Following GM's bankruptcy, in 2010 Xerox took back the management of its pension assets.

Other early examples of pension fund investment outsourcing included Brown & Williamson, Weyerhauser, Maytag, ADM and K-Mart.

In the United States, movement toward outsourcing by state, county or municipal pension plans has been slower than corporate pensions. This is despite the difficulty that many public pension funds have recruiting and retaining qualified staff, particularly in alternatives such as hedge funds, private equity and real assets such as real estate, oil & gas and infrastructure.

The most high-profile outsourcing attempt involves the San Diego County Employees Retirement Association. The association's board of trustees hired Lee Partridge, who created a firm called Integrity Capital, as their "outsourced CIO" in 2009. The pension system kept three staff investment officers, who were in charge of the fund's private market investments, which totaled 30% of the fund. This arrangement sparked controversy among certain groups in San Diego. In 2010, Integrity Capital merged with Salient Partners, and Partridge and Salient continued to fulfill the original contract. In 2012, Salient won a competitive bid to continue to oversee the $9.1 billion plan. On June 5, 2014, the entirety of the San Diego investment program, including the private market assets that had been managed by investment staff, was outsourced to Salient.

In June 2012, the San Jose Police & Fire Department Retirement Plan and the San Jose Federated City Employees' Retirement System were known to be exploring outsourcing the management of their plans. Internal research prepared for San Jose estimated that an outsourcer would charge between 0.3% and 1.0% to manage their $2.646 billion plan, but thought it would be recovered through higher returns.

Beyond outsourcing, pension fund investment teams have occasionally grown to take in other, unrelated, assets. Previously the Weyerhauser/Morgan Stanley and General Motors Asset Management examples were noted. Other examples include Owens-Illinois, General Electric and American Airlines. In 1987, Owens-Illinois’ investment management subsidiary, Harbor Capital Advisors, launched five mutual funds targeting defined contribution plans. American Airlines’ AMR Investment Services (now called Beacon Funds) has its own family of mutual fund products. GE Investments offers a variety of funds to others, in addition to managing mutual funds. Fiduciary Asset Management, one of the early total plan outsourcers, instead of taking on additional outsourcing clients, created a team that invests in master limited partnership and now manages nearly $4 billion in external capital. Fiduciary Asset Management was previously owned by Piper Jaffray.

== Endowment model outsourcing ==
The outsourced investment model for universities, foundations and non-profits was pioneered by Commonfund. In 1971 Commonfund was created as a result of a Ford Foundation funded study which found that small endowments chronically underperformed. More recently, the success of university endowments such as Yale, Harvard and Stanford to generate attractive returns prompted a number of former endowment investment teams to open outsourced CIO firms. These firms include (alphabetically): Agility (University of Colorado), Global Endowment Management (Duke Endowment and Duke University), Investure (University of Virginia), Makena Capital (Stanford University), Morgan Creek (University of North Carolina at Chapel Hill), Spider Management (University of Richmond), TIAA-CREF (Rice University) and Verger Capital Management (Wake Forest University).

The fees charged by endowment style outsourced managers vary widely based upon a number of factors including size and complexity. In general, fees charged by endowment outsourcing managers tend to be higher than generalist outsourcers. The primary difference stems from the experience and expertise that endowment-style firms usually have in areas such as hedge funds, private equity and real assets. Endowment OCIO fees range between 0.35% and 1.5% with most groups charging an incentive fee as well. Commonfund (and its affiliates Commonfund Capital and Commonfund Asset Management), one of the true pioneers in the outsourced endowment model, quote a complex schedule of fees which they summarize this way: "Commonfund Capital’s fees for separate accounts ranges from 50-100 basis points, with varying ranges with respect to the carried interest." An analysis of Commonfund Asset Management's Form ADV Part 2 filing with the SEC for a hypothetical $1 billion account with a 50% equity allocation, 30% in hedge funds and 20% in fixed income would result in total management fees of 85 basis points plus an unspecified level of carried interest.

Firm name	Assets under management
Commonfund	$25.2 billion
Makena	$19.4 billion
Partners Capital Investment Group	$16.2 billion
Morgan Creek	$1.8 billion
Investure	$27.6 billion
The Investment Fund for Foundations ("TIFF")	$9.2 billion
Cambridge Associates	$7.3 billion
Global Endowment Management	$8.3 billion
Agility (Perella Weinberg)	$6.1 billion
Edgehill Endowment Partners	$4.1 Billion
HighVista	$3.5 billion
CornerStone Partners	$10.0 billion
Spider Management Company	$3.1 billion
TIAA Endowments	$2.4 billion
New Providence Asset Management	$2.4 billion
Mangham Partners	$2.3 billion
Angeles Investment Advisors	$2.1 billion
Okabena Advisors	$1.3 billion
Verger Capital Management	$2.2 billion
Lowe, Brockenbrough & Company (Bespoke Strategies)	$1.2 billion
