= Engineers Gate =

Quantitative asset management firm based in New York

Engineers Gate Manager LP
- Company type: Private
- Industry: Investment Management
- Founded: 2014; 12 years ago
- Founder: Glenn Dubin
- Headquarters: New York City, U.S.
- Key people: Greg Eisner (CEO)
- Products: Hedge funds Quantitative finance
- AUM: US$4 billion (2025)
- Number of employees: 179 (2025)
- Website: www.eglp.com

Engineers Gate Manager LP (Engineers Gate) is an American quantitative investment management firm headquartered in New York City.

== History ==
In early 2014, Engineers Gate was founded by Glenn Dubin who held a majority stake in it and was also its chairman. Paul Tudor Jones was an early backer of the firm and held an equity stake of at least 10%. The name of the firm comes from one of the entrances to New York City's Central Park. It focused on quantitative investing and hired people with mathematical backgrounds from firms such as S.A.C. Capital Advisors and Citadel LLC. Engineers Gate was supposed to be a follow up to Dubin' success story in founding Highbridge Capital Management. The idea was to create a quantitative computer driven platform to manage the money of Dubin as well as a few institutional investors.

In October 2015, CPP Investments became the largest investor in Engineers Gate.

Since its founding up to 2019, Engineers Gate had a positive return each year with an annualized performance of 5% although returns were below investor expectations. In June 2019, Engineers Gate pitched investors at a high-profile Goldman Sachs event at the Yankee Stadium buts shied away from providing key details, including specific performance data. Prospective clients were required to return documents before leaving the room. In August 2019, it was revealed that Dubin had ties to Jeffrey Epstein which including helping arrange the deal of selling Highbridge to JPMorgan Chase. Low returns combined with unwanted notoriety, led Dubin working to contain the damage for Engineers Gate which included trying to win over new investors to raise $500 million. CPP Investments was reported to have grown frustrated with the firm's low returns as well as management and was scrutinizing its investment in it.

In January 2020, Dubin announced he would retire from the financial industry to focus on private investments. As a result he would step down from his position turning over both power and ownership to the firm's management. The firm's president Greg Eisner who already ran most day-to-day operations would become CEO. Dubin stated his exit had nothing to do with his ties to Epstein. Instead Dubin made his decision to exit after a large investor threatened to withdraw its funds.

In February 2020, Blackstone Inc. replaced CPP Investments as the largest investor in Engineers Gate after CPP Investments withdrew its holdings due to aforementioned concerns.

In February 2022, it was reported that Millennium Management, LLC and Point72 Asset Management were separately in talks to buy Engineers Gate. This came at a time where hedge funds faced an extremely tough environment for raising capital as well as pressures on fees from investors and spiraling costs.

In May 2024, it was reported that Engineers Gate was opening an office in Singapore to expand its coverage in Asia. At that time, the firm had offices in New York and London.

In June 2025, Business Insider reported that Engineers Gate had double digits gain since 2023 which marked a sharp turn from 2020.
