= 12-12-12 =

2013 documentary film

- Distributed by: The Weinstein Company
- Release date: October 29, 2013
- Country: United States
- Language: English

12-12-12 is a documentary film that premiered on October 29, 2013 at the Directors Guild of America theater on Sunset Boulevard in Hollywood.

Filmed from 23 different camera angles, the documentary was originally to have been two separate films, made by two separate production groups, one headed by Sir Paul McCartney, and one from the Robin Hood Foundation's film team. After production crews encountered one another at Madison Square Garden during filming, the two teams joined forces to create a single film using both companies' equipment and resources.

On December 12, 2012, some of entertainment's most iconic names came together at Madison Square Garden for a historic concert to benefit the victims of Hurricane Sandy, 12-12-12: The Concert for Sandy Relief.

It was produced jointly by James Dolan, Executive Chairman of The Madison Square Garden Company; John Sykes, President of Entertainment Enterprises for Clear Channel Media Holdings.; and Harvey Weinstein, co-founder and chairman of The Weinstein Company, and presented by Chase with all proceeds going to the Robin Hood Relief Fund.

12-12-12 covers behind-the-scenes and onstage moments from the historic concert -- "the largest gathering of old British musicians ever in Madison Square Garden" an until-then unprecedented gathering of musicians, performers, and public figures who took the stage or worked behind the scenes to raise over fifty million U.S. dollars in one night for the Robin Hood Hurricane Sandy Relief Fund and to quickly distribute the entirety of the funds to organizations helping victims in New York, New Jersey and Connecticut. Edited in a roughly sequential fashion, the film is at once: a documentary about community heroism; a concert film; and an exploration of the wide range of efforts needed to produce such a concert, from gathering the artists, to planning the event, through load-in and rehearsal, solving "money problems" and technical issues with web-based donations, and finally the performances themselves.
