= Brooke Harlow =

American businesswoman

- Born: D. Brooke Harlow
- Education: El Colegio de México
- Alma mater: Yale University (BA)
- Occupation: Chief Commercial Officer
- Employer: Balyasny Asset Management
- Spouse: Kevin Scott Lynyak (m. 2007)

D. Brooke Harlow is an American businesswoman, currently working as the Chief Global Affairs Officer at Balyasny Asset Management. Previously she was Chief Commercial Officer of the Managed Funds Association. Working as a Managing Director at Highbridge Capital Management and J.P. Morgan Chase in the past, Brooke Harlow has done communications work with companies such as Burson-Marstellar and CNN.

== Education ==
Harlow graduated from Yale University in 1996 with a B.A. in American Studies. She was named a Rotary Scholar in 1997, and studied at El Colegio de México as part of the Masters in International Relations program in Mexico City, Mexico.

== Career ==
Since 2023, Brooke Harlow has been the Chief Global Affairs officer with Balyasny Asset Management. Prior to that she was the Chief Commercial Officer at the Managed Funds Association. She also served as Executive Director of the private foundation the Center For Alternative Investment Education. Harlow was the Executive Vice President and Managing Director for Marketing and Communications at the Managed Funds Association from 2009 until 2018.

Before joining MFA, Harlow was Managing Director of Communications and Public Affairs at New York-based hedge fund manager Highbridge Capital Management,. She also served as the firm’s spokesperson.

Prior to her work with Highbridge Capital, Harlow was Vice President of Investment Bank Marketing and Communications at JP Morgan Chase for six years.

Harlow served as a senior associate in the public affairs practice at Burson-Marsteller in Washington, D.C., and worked as a field producer for CNN in Washington, D.C. and Mexico City.

== Other activities ==
Ms. Harlow is a life member of the Council on Foreign Relations, a member of the Women's Board of the Boys Club of New York City, and an advisor to the Center for Public Leadership at Harvard University. She is a member of the National Press Club in Washington, D.C. Harlow is a board member of the Surgeons OverSeas (SOS) Board of Directors, and a Sustaining Angel at 100 Women in Hedge Funds. Harlow is also a supporter of the Museum of the City of New York, the Central Park Conservancy women’s committee and the Horticultural Society of New York. Harlow has been published on issues related to regulation and legislation around the hedge fund industry and is a frequent speaker and moderator on topics related to and about the media and the alternative investment industry.

== Personal life ==
Brooke married Kevin Scott Lynyak on June 16, 2007.
