= Puth =

Puth may refer to:

== People ==
- Charlie Puth (born 1991), American singer, songwriter and record producer
- David Puth, American financial services executive
- Johannes Puth (1900–1957), German politician
- Karl Puth (1891–1955), German cinematographer
- Klaus Puth (born 1957), German caricaturist and illustrator
- Stephen Puth (born 1994), American singer-songwriter

== Places ==
- Puth, Netherlands, village in Limburg, Netherlands
- Moru Puth, mountain in South Sudan
- Morua Puth, hill in Kenya
- Kasteel Puth, castle in South Limburg (Netherlands)
