= Save the Music Foundation =

Non-profit organization

Save The Music Foundation
- Save the Music Foundation
- Formation: 1997
- Founder: John Sykes
- Headquarters: New York, New York
- Executive director: Henry Donahue
- Awards: Governors' Award from the Academy of Television Arts & Sciences; George Foster Peabody Award; Cable Television Public Affairs Association Golden Beacon Award
- Website: savethemusic.org
- Formerly called: VH1 Save the Music

Save the Music Foundation (STM), formerly known as VH1 Save the Music, is an American 501(c)(3) nonprofit that supports music education in public schools. Working directly with communities to address systemic inequities in music education and create sustainable programs, Save the Music has donated more than $78 million in instruments and music technology equipment to approximately 2800 public schools since it was founded in 1997.

== Background ==
Save the Music was founded in response to the budget cuts of the 1990s that decreased arts education in public schools, particularly in urban areas. Although research demonstrated its positive impact on math, literacy, and science skills, in addition to cognitive, cultural, and social development, children's access to music education in public schools was reduced. In New York City, only one-third of elementary schools had music teachers, and the availability of musical instruments for students was limited.

In 1997, John Sykes, then the president of VH1, participated in the "Principal for a Day" program at PS 58, an elementary school in Brooklyn. He founded Save the Music after seeing the school's fifth-grade orchestra playing instruments that were held together with duct tape and learning that the school's music program was shutting down due to funding cuts.

In January 2025, Save The Music announced that it was officially ending its affiliation with Paramount Global, the parent company of VH1.

== History ==
=== Launch, early expansion ===
Save the Music was formally launched during the April 1997 broadcast of VH1 Honors, an annual awards show. Performers including Stevie Wonder and James Taylor encouraged viewers to donate their used musical instruments to local school systems, and the importance of music education for children was addressed by Celine Dion, Sheryl Crow, Alice Cooper, Emmylou Harris, and then-president Bill Clinton, among others.VH1 Honors raised $150,000 for Save the Music. In 1998, Divas Live, a VH1 show created specifically to benefit Save the Music, premiered with Mariah Carey, Dion, Gloria Estefan, Aretha Franklin, Carole King, and Shania Twain, drawing what was then VH1's largest audience. Music education programs in Los Angeles and New York were in place by late 1997, and following the first Divas Live, Save the Music expanded to Las Vegas, Detroit, and New Orleans.

In 2001, Save the Music expanded to communities in 43 cities. A program in partnership with the ASCAP Foundation, the Diane Warren Association, and Warner Records also provided sheet music, band arrangements, folios, and method books to STM beneficiary schools. In 2002, an STM campaign to rebuild music education programs in 65 schools in the Milwaukee area won the Golden Beacon Award from the National Governer's Association.

In 2007, with $40 million in new instruments donated to restored music programs in 1500 elementary and middle schools in 100 cities, STM celebrated its 10th anniversary with a fundraiser that honored Bill and Hillary Clinton. Among others, Mariah Carey, Bon Jovi, John Mayer, and an orchestra composed of students who received STM grants performed at the event, which raised more than $2 million for the foundation.

=== Advocacy, J Dilla Music Tech Grant, Hometown 2 Hometown ===
In addition to related advocacy initiatives, STM has addressed elected officials and policymakers on Capitol Hill and lobbied for congressional bills such as the Every Student Succeeds Act. Tools for grassroots advocacy are available to the public on the Save The Music website.

The J Dilla Music Tech Grant, a program for public high school students focused on electronic music, was developed in partnership with Arizona State University and Pharrell Williams' creative collective. Piloted in Philadelphia, Miami, Brooklyn, and Newark high schools in 2018 and officially launched in 2019, the grant funds recording and production training, instruments, audio equipment, and computer hardware and software for public high schools. Save The Music supports recipients for 10 years.

In 2019 STM launched Hometown 2 Hometown, an annual Nashville-based awards ceremony and fundraising event that honors musicians and others in the country music community for their contributions to music education. Funds raised through Hometown 2 Hometown are used to develop music technology programs in Nashville and the hometowns of honorees including Leslie Fram, Mickey Guyton, Trisha Yearwood, Maren Morris, and Brittney Spencer.

Save the Music's 20th anniversary event in 2017 featured Queen Latifah, DJ Khaled, and Steve Aoki. In 2023, STM marked its 25th anniversary with LA Music Saves, a concert and fundraiser in Los Angeles that honored LL Cool J, Cindy Mabe, Becky G, and Adam Blackstone. Money raised at the event supported the restoration of music education programs in Los Angeles and funded new music programs for 50 Los Angeles-area schools.

== Artist involvement ==
Artists have been significantly involved with Save the Music since 1997. Beyoncé, Lady Gaga, Bono, Miley Cyrus, Becky G, Wyclef Jean,Jelly Roll, Elton John,Alicia Keys, Paul McCartney, and Ed Sheeran have made direct donations, performed at events, and/or appeared on behalf of STM in public service announcements and other awareness campaigns. Bill Clinton has been one of the foundation's most active advocates. Beyoncé, Kelly Clarkson, Katy Perry, and Britney Spears, among others, have promoted music education for children as Save the Music ambassadors.
