= Salient =

Salient may refer to:

- Salient (military), a battlefield feature that projects into enemy territory
- Salient (geography), an elongated protrusion of a territory
- Salient (heraldry), an adjective describing a heraldic beast in a leaping attitude
- Salient pole, a projecting electromagnetic pole of a field coil
- SALIENT, SALt Irradiation ExperimeNT, a thorium molten salt reactor
- Salient (magazine), Victoria University of Wellington student publication
- Salient Software, a utility software company between 1990 and 1992, taken over by Fifth Generation Systems, meanwhile Symantec / Norton
- Salient Partners, an asset management firm
- Salient CRGT, a US government IT services firm based in Fairfax, Virginia

== See also ==
- Salience (disambiguation)
