= Hirtle (surname) =

Hirtle is a surname. Notable people with the surname include:

- Alana Hirtle, Canadian politician
- Jonathan Hirtle, American businessman
