= Robin Hood Foundation =

Charitable organization in New York City

- Founded: 1988; 38 years ago
- Founder: Paul Tudor Jones; Peter Borish; Glenn Dubin; David Saltzman; Maurice Chessa
- Type: Venture philanthropy
- Purpose: Poverty reduction
- Location: New York, New York, United States
- Region served: New York City
- Method: Combining investment principles and philanthropy to assist programs that target poverty.
- Revenue: $132,189,791 (2019)
- Expenses: $157,218,464 (2015)
- Website: robinhood.org

Robin Hood is a charitable organization which attempts to alleviate problems caused by poverty in New York City. The organization also administers a relief fund for disasters in the New York City area. In 2017, Wes Moore became the first CEO. In September 2021, Richard Buery Jr. replaced Moore as the CEO.

== History ==
Founded in 1988 and named after the heroic outlaw from English folklore, Robin Hood was conceived by hedge fund manager Paul Tudor Jones and co-founded with Peter Borish and Glenn Dubin.

The foundation combines investment principles and philanthropy to assist programs that target poverty in New York City.

Funding for the organization's activities comes from donations and fund raising efforts. In 2009, George Soros gave the foundation a US$50 million contribution over three years. The money reportedly helped the organization raise significantly more than that amount, as it was contingent on Robin Hood's board members matching that donation.

As of 2016, the foundation was No. 79 on the Forbes 100 Largest U.S. Charities list.

In 2017, Robin Hood appointed author and veterans advocate Wes Moore as its CEO. Moore grew up in poverty in the Bronx before becoming a Rhodes scholar at the University of Oxford, a paratrooper and captain in the 82nd Airborne, and investment banker at Citigroup. Moore succeeded David Saltzman who was the executive director since co-founding the organization.

Wes Moore stepped down as CEO of Robin Hood in May 2021. Derek Ferguson, who served as Robin Hood's Chief Operating Officer since December 2017, stepped into the role of Interim Chief Executive Officer until a permanent replacement was identified. As of September 2021, Richard Buery Jr. joined Robin Hood as the new chief executive officer. Buery served in leadership roles with Robin Hood partners Achievement First and Children's Aid, and as a Deputy Mayor of New York City.

In May 2022, during Robin Hood's annual event to benefit poverty-fighting efforts in New York, the company announced the launch of a new $100 million Child Care Quality and Innovation Initiative for New York City. The fund was created from commitments of $50 million from Robin Hood, $25 million from Ohanian's 776 Foundation, and $50 million from New York City. Additionally, the annual event raised $126 million, all of which supported poverty-fighting programs citywide.

== Events ==
In 2001, The Concert for New York City provided funds for the organization in response to the September 11 attacks, raising $35 million.

In 2010, a key supporter gave every family with children on welfare in New York State $200 to buy school supplies.

After Hurricane Sandy in 2012, the 12-12-12: The Concert for Sandy Relief concert also provided funds for the foundation's efforts, with $35 million in ticket sales and $50 million total.

In May 2020, Robin Hood, along with iHeartMedia held a virtual hour-long telethon called Rise Up New York! aimed at supporting the residents of New York who had been heavily impacted by the COVID-19 pandemic in the United States. The event raised over $115 million.

== Grant making ==
Robin Hood funds more than 300 nonprofit organizations. The organization aligns its grant making approach with life-stage milestones for economic mobility: early childhood, school-age children, young adults, and adults & household supports. Robin Hood also makes grants to support capacity building, policy advocacy, and special initiatives. Since its founding in 1988, Robin Hood has invested $3 billion to fight poverty in New York City.

== Reception ==
Robin Hood was featured in Fortune's 18 September 2006 issue, where the article states that the foundation is "one of the most innovative and influential philanthropic organizations of our time". On September 16, 2013 the news show 60 Minutes aired a report on Jones and how the Foundation has given away more than 25 million dollars.

== Board of Directors and notable members ==
Robin Hood's Board of Directors includes a cross section of notable leaders from a variety of sectors, such as finance and business; sports and entertainment; government; philanthropy; education, and entertainment. The current chair of the Board is Kenneth G. Tropin, chairman and Founder of Graham Capital Management.

Notable board members, past and present include:

- Lee Ainslie, Maverick Capital
- Lloyd C. Blankfein, Goldman Sachs
- Peter Borish, Twinfields Capital
- Geoffrey Canada, Harlem Children's Zone
- Tom Brokaw, NBC News
- Richard Chilton, Chilton Investment
- Steven A. Cohen, SAC Capital
- Glenn Dubin, Highbridge Capital
- Marian Wright Edelman, Children's Defense Fund
- Richard S. Fuld Jr., Lehman Brothers
- Jeffrey R. Immelt, General Electric
- Paul Tudor Jones II, Tudor Investment
- Marie-Josée Kravis, Hudson Institute
- Kenneth G. Langone, Invemed Associates
- Doug Morris, Universal Music
- Daniel Och, Och-Ziff Capital
- Gwyneth Paltrow, Actress
- Robert Pittman, Pilot Group
- David Puth, J.P. Morgan Chase
- Diane Sawyer, ABC News
- Alan D. Schwartz, Guggenheim Partners
- John Sykes, MTV Networks
- Marta Tienda, Princeton University
- Harvey Weinstein, Weinstein Co.
- Dirk Edward Ziff, Ziff Brothers
