= Henry Swieca =

American businessman (born 1957)

- Born: Henry Alexander Swieca; 1957; Washington Heights, Manhattan, New York
- Education: Stony Brook University (B.A.); Columbia Business School (M.B.A)
- Occupation: Hedge fund manager
- Known for: co-Founder of Highbridge Capital Management
- Spouse: Estee Tobaly
- Children: 4

Henry Alexander Swieca (born 1957) is the co-founder and former Chief Investment Officer of Highbridge Capital Management and the founder of Talpion Fund Management.

== Early life ==
Swieca grew up in a Jewish family in Washington Heights, Manhattan, New York. He is the son of two Holocaust survivors from Poland who emigrated from France in 1955.

Swieca graduated from SUNY Stony Brook was later accepted into Columbia Business School on a two-year deferment. He graduated in 1982 or 1983.

== Career ==
Swieca began his career trading stocks with $50,000 that his parents left for him. He was able to support his brother through medical school with the money he made from investing. After graduation, Swieca worked at Merrill Lynch, becoming one of the founding traders on the New York Futures Exchange where he traded equity index options. He later joined Dillon Read as an institutional investor advisor.

=== Swieca Group at E.F. Hutton ===
In 1984, Swieca and Glenn Dubin formed the Dubin and Swieca Group at E.F. Hutton. They pioneered the integration of traditional securities investments and derivative investment strategies.

=== Highbridge Capital Management ===
In 1992 Swieca started Highbridge Capital Management with childhood friend Glenn Dubin. Swieca served as the firm's chief investment officer from inception to its acquisition. They sold a 55% stake to JP Morgan Chase in 2004 and substantially all remaining shares in 2009. As Highbridge CIO, he guided the firm through multiple market cycles as it achieved one of the best risk adjusted returns in the hedge fund industry.

=== Talpion Fund Management ===
Swieca currently runs his family office, Talpion Fund Management, which invests proprietary money in a hedge fund-like structure as well as direct fixed income investing. In 2012 he seeded Clearline Capital, an equity investor. The family office has also branched into direct real estate investing, as well as venture capital under the name QB1 Ventures.

== Philanthropy ==
Swieca is on the board of The National World War II Museum and resigned from the board of The Columbia Graduate School of Business in October 2023 after serving since 2014.

== Personal ==
Swieca is married to Israeli American Estee Tobaly with whom he has four children. Swieca practices Orthodox Judaism. Swieca owns a summer residence in Atlantic Beach, New York.
