= Glenn Dubin =

American hedge fund manager (born 1957)

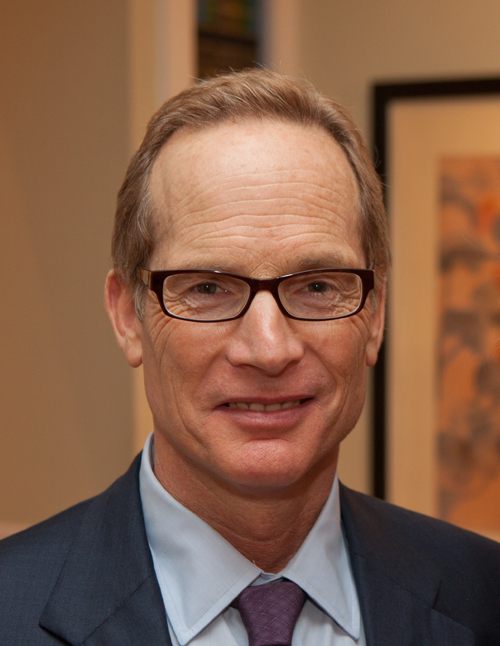
- Dubin in 2010
- Born: Glenn Russell Dubin; April 13, 1957 (age 69); New York City, US
- Education: Stony Brook University (BA)
- Occupation: Hedge fund manager
- Known for: Co-Founder, Highbridge Capital Management; Founder, Engineers Gate; Investor, Castleton Commodities International
- Spouse: Eva Andersson (m. 1994)
- Children: 3

Glenn Russell Dubin (born April 13, 1957) is an American billionaire hedge fund manager and the Principal of Dubin & Co. LP, a private investment company. He is the co-founder of Highbridge Capital Management, founder of Engineers Gate, and a founding board member of the Robin Hood Foundation.

== Early life ==
Glenn Russell Dubin was born to a Jewish middle-class family in the Washington Heights section of upper Manhattan, New York. He is the oldest son of Harvey and Edith Dubin. His father was a taxi driver who later worked in dress manufacturing. His mother emigrated to the United States from Austria and worked as a hospital administrator.

Dubin attended public school at Washington Heights's P.S. 132 and received a bachelor's degree in economics from Stony Brook University, where he was a member of the school's football team and lacrosse club. In May 2012, he was the keynote speaker at Stony Brook University's commencement and received an honorary degree of Doctor of Letters for his contributions to finance and philanthropy.

== Career ==
Dubin began his career in finance as a retail stock broker at E. F. Hutton & Co. in 1978. At Hutton, Dubin worked with Paul Tudor Jones.

In 1984, Dubin and his childhood friend Henry Swieca founded Dubin & Swieca Capital Management, an early fund of funds that constructed multi-manager hedge fund portfolios guided by modern portfolio theory. In 2005, the firm was renamed Corbin Capital Partners, as Dubin and Swieca were no longer involved in its day-to-day management. The name reportedly originated from a Washington Heights intersection where the founders met when they were 5 years old.

In 1992, Dubin and Swieca founded Highbridge Capital Management, an institutional alternative-asset management firm, with $35 million in capital. It is named after the aqueduct between Washington Heights and the Bronx. In late 2004, J. P. Morgan Asset Management—a division of JPMorgan Chase—purchased a majority interest in Highbridge for $1.3 billion.

Between 2004 and 2007, Highbridge grew to over $35 billion in assets under management. In 2006, Highbridge invested as a joint venture in Louis Dreyfus Group to increase their access to and control of energy delivery within trading markets.

In July 2009, J. P. Morgan Asset Management completed its purchase of substantially all remaining shares of the firm. After the purchase, Dubin remained Highbridge's chief executive.

In October 2012, it was announced that Dubin, Paul Tudor Jones, and Timothy Barakett were among a group of investors buying the merchant energy operation then called Louis Dreyfus Highbridge Energy ("LDH Energy") and renamed it Castleton Commodities International, LLC.

In 2013, Dubin founded the quantitative-trading firm Engineers Gate Manager LP. As of 2017, the company, along with Dubin's family office, was headquartered at Hudson Yards.

In 2015, CCI acquired Morgan Stanley's Global Oil Merchanting business, creating one of the world's largest independent energy merchants. Dubin was the non-executive chairman and remains a member of the board of directors and the firm's lead shareholder.

In January 2020, Dubin announced he was retiring from the hedge fund industry to focus on private investments and philanthropy through his family office, Dubin & Co.

== Philanthropy ==
In 1987, Dubin was asked by his fellow hedge fund manager and friend Paul Tudor Jones to join him and Peter Borish in a venture philanthropy project Jones had conceived and started. The resulting Robin Hood Foundation has raised and granted more than $3 billion to fight poverty in New York City. Dubin has served on the board since its founding, is a former board chair, and sits on the Jobs and Economic Security subcommittee.

In 2010, Dubin established the Dubin Fellowship for Emerging Leaders at the Center for Public Leadership at Harvard's Kennedy School with a $5 million gift. He had formed a relationship with the school two years earlier while speaking before the school's students. The fellowship provides tuition for up to ten students each year. Dubin also serves on the Kennedy School's Dean's executive committee.

In 2010, the Dubin family donated $4.3 million to Stony Brook University toward the creation of the Dubin Family Athletic Performance Center in the Stony Brook Indoor Sports Complex. In 2015, the Dubin family donated $5 million toward the creation of Stony Brook University's Indoor Training Facility, which opened in 2020.

Dubin is a trustee of the Mt. Sinai Medical Center. He and his wife, Eva Andersson-Dubin, funded the Dubin Breast Center of the Tisch Cancer Institute at Mount Sinai in 2010.

On April 19, 2012, Dubin and Andersson-Dubin signed The Giving Pledge, created by Bill Gates and Warren Buffett. The commitment of the pledge is to give away at least 50% of their wealth to charity within their lifetimes.

In 2024, Dubin and Andersson-Dubin gave $10 million to the New York Climate Exchange.

== Political donations ==
Dubin donates to Democratic Party causes, giving $75,000 in 2019. He donated to the congressional campaigns of Abigail Spanberger, Gil Cisneros, Max Rose, Dan McCready, and Elaine Luria. He also donated $1,000 each to the 2020 presidential campaigns of Steve Bullock and Michael Bennet. Pete Buttigieg received $2,800.

In 2023, Dubin donated $100,000 to a Super PAC supporting the Republican presidential candidate Vivek Ramaswamy.

== Relationship with Jeffrey Epstein ==
There are several connections between Dubin and Jeffrey Epstein. Epstein invested millions in Dubin's hedge fund and helped JPMorgan acquire Dubin's firm. Epstein had also dated Dubin's wife, Eva Andersson-Dubin, for nearly a decade starting in the 1980s, and was the godfather of Dubin’s children.

=== JP Morgan suspicious transaction report ===
In 2019, JPMorgan Chase included transactions involving Dubin in a suspicious activity report covering approximately 4,700 Epstein-linked transactions totaling more than $1 billion. The report said the transactions as a whole were potentially related to reports of human trafficking, but did not describe the nature of the transactions involving Dubin or Epstein's role in them. A spokesperson for Dubin said the transactions were unrelated to Epstein's crimes. Dubin has not been charged with any crime in connection with Epstein.

=== Giuffre lawsuit allegations ===
In 2024, documents pertaining to Virginia Giuffre's 2015 civil suit against Ghislaine Maxwell were unsealed. In a deposition, Giuffre testified that Maxwell had instructed her to "have sex with Glenn Dubin" and others. The Dubins said they were "outraged by the allegations" and "categorically reject them".

In the same civil suit, one of Dubin's former chefs, Rinaldo Rizzo, testified in a 2016 deposition that in late 2004 or early 2005, Epstein and Maxwell visited the Dubins' home in Palm Beach and brought a teenage girl along. Rizzo said the girl told him that she was 15 and that Epstein and Maxwell had taken her passport and phone and tried to make her have sex on Epstein's island; he also said Eva Dubin announced the girl would be working for the family as a nanny. According to Rizzo, he saw the girl a month later on a flight to Sweden on the Dubins' private plane. Rizzo said the plane stopped at a different airport en route, the girl disembarked, and he "never saw or heard from her again". The Dubins have denied Rizzo's allegation, citing flight logs that show their plane did not stop at any other airports en route to Sweden and that the only minors on the logs are their own children.

In 2026, a spokesperson for the couple said: "As the Dubins have said for years, they were horrified by the allegations against Jeffrey Epstein. Had they been aware of Epstein's vile and unspeakable conduct, they would have cut off all ties long ago and certainly never allowed him to be in the presence of their children."

== Personal life ==
In 1987, Dubin married Elizabeth Saltzman, an associate editor at Vogue magazine. The marriage ended in divorce. In 1994, Dubin married Eva Andersson, a physician. They have three children. He first saw her on the New York Post's Page Six in a modeling photo.

The Dubins live in Manhattan. From 2006 to 2016 they owned the sprawling apartment on Fifth Avenue that formerly belonged to Jacqueline Kennedy Onassis. In 2024, they bought a 4,100-square-foot condominium for one of their daughters. They also live part-time in their Palm Beach, Florida home; own the 7,000-acre Castleton Ranch in Colorado's Gunnison County; and maintain residences in Westchester County, New York, and Gothenburg, Sweden.
