= 12-12-12: The Concert for Sandy Relief =

Benefit concerts held in 2012

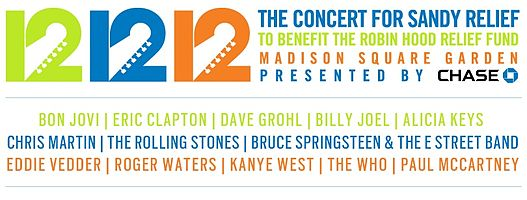
- Genre: Benefit concert
- Dates: December 12, 2012
- Locations: Madison Square Garden; New York City, New York, United States
- Founders: James L. Dolan, John Sykes and Harvey Weinstein

12-12-12: The Concert for Sandy Relief was a benefit concert that took place at Madison Square Garden in New York City on December 12, 2012.

The concert was held in response to Hurricane Sandy, which devastated portions of the Northeastern United States, the Caribbean and the Mid-Atlantic in late October 2012 and cost an estimated $60 billion in damage in the United States. The concert was broadcast live via television, radio, movie theaters and the Internet, and released on DVD and CD. A documentary film was also made about the concert. Proceeds from the event were collected by the Robin Hood Relief Fund to benefit victims of the hurricane in New York, New Jersey and Connecticut.

Many famous performers took part in the charity event, including the Who, Bruce Springsteen, Alicia Keys, Bon Jovi, Eric Clapton, Billy Joel, the Rolling Stones, Roger Waters, Chris Martin, Michael Stipe, Kanye West, Eddie Vedder, and, for the first time in eighteen years, the surviving members of Nirvana (Dave Grohl, Krist Novoselic and touring member Pat Smear) who performed together in a collaboration with Paul McCartney during his show-closing set.

== Background ==
The benefit concert was first announced in mid-November 2012 and that the producers behind 2001's The Concert for New York City would also produce the Hurricane Sandy benefit which quickly attracted many big names from the music industry. The venue and on sale date for tickets were announced in early December. Madison Square Garden had originally been reserved on December 12 for a New York Rangers game against the Montreal Canadiens that was one of the 510 regular season games that were canceled due to the 2012–13 NHL lockout.

Proceeds from the event went to the Robin Hood Relief Fund and benefit victims of the hurricane in areas most impacted, especially New York, New Jersey and Connecticut. More than $35 million was raised through ticket sales and $50 million total.

== Tickets ==
Tickets for the event went on sale through Ticketmaster on December 3, 2012, at noon though Chase Bank customers were allowed to buy tickets at 9 a.m. Tickets quickly sold out in minutes. The face-value of tickets ranged from $150 to $2,500, with organizers saying all proceeds would go to the Robin Hood Foundation. Like most concerts with high demands for tickets, scalpers were able to buy tickets and within minutes of the concert selling out were already available for re-sale at much higher prices on various sites, including StubHub. By December 7, 2012, tickets for the floor in front of the stage were listed for as much as $48,000 while those in the upper level were going for $525 to $3,000.

Producers of the event urged people to not buy from these secondary websites because the money no longer goes to charity. U.S. Senator Charles E. Schumer sent a letter to StubHub and three other major online ticket exchanges, urging them to not allow sellers to profit from the demand for the concert stating that "Every dollar spent for these concert tickets should go to help the victims of Superstorm Sandy, not to line the pockets of unscrupulous scalpers". A spokesman for StubHub, Glenn Lehrman, said it did not have the technology to require sellers to give their profits to charity. StubHub gave its commissions of more than $500,000 to the charity.

Jacqueline Peterson, a spokeswoman for Ticketmaster, which handled the initial ticket sales, said her company had evidence that scalpers had used computer programs to snap up large numbers of tickets for resale. She said Ticketmaster had blocked thousands of sales to buyers that it identified as using these programs. Among the recipients of Schumer's letter were TicketMaster's in-house resale marketplaces, TicketsNow and TicketExchange; however, Peterson said that 12-12-12 tickets were not being allowed on those sites. TicketLiquidator, another secondary re-sale website, also said that it had declined to carry tickets for the concert.

There were also some incidents of counterfeit tickets.

== Broadcast ==
The concert was simulcast live on 39 U.S. television stations, including HBO, AMC, Showtime and AXS TV and on more than 20 international television networks. It was also streamed on over twenty-five websites, including Fuse.tv, MTV.com, AOL, Yahoo!, YouTube, SiriusXM, Hulu, and Vevo and over fifty radio stations. Select movie theaters in New York, New Jersey and Connecticut displayed the concert as well. Ion Television, Live Well Network and MundoFox were the only national over-the-air broadcasters to carry the concert. Locally, the PBS consortium WNET/WLIW/NJTV carried it on their stations, along with CBS's WLNY (Channel 55) and WRNN-TV (Channel 48). WPSG (Channel 57) carried the show locally in Philadelphia.

Event producers James Dolan, John Sykes and Harvey Weinstein issued on December 3, 2012, the following joint statement: "The fact that so many major media companies are joining forces to distribute and stream this important event to homes worldwide will enable us to create a tremendous and unprecedented fundraising effort on a global scale to benefit the victims of this devastating storm."

While every major U.S. media company aired the benefit on at least one of their networks, none of the major over-the-air television networks—including CBS, ABC, Fox and NBC—aired it, and neither did the major cable-news networks of CNN, MSNBC and the Fox News Channel. Clear Channel broadcast the concert live on some of its radio stations across the country and also streamed it live on iHeartRadio, its digital-radio service, and across the websites and Facebook pages of its 850 stations. The concert also aired in conjunction with the NBA's television and online streaming broadcasts in China and simulcast live on Clear Channel Outdoor digital billboards in Times Square and locations in London and Paris.

== Performers and segments ==
The event began at 7:30 pm and ran until 1:20 am.

1. Video montage of news coverage of the aftermath of Hurricane Sandy
2. Bruce Springsteen and the E Street Band
  1. "Land of Hope and Dreams" with portion of "People Get Ready"
  2. "Wrecking Ball"
  3. "My City of Ruins" with portion of "Jersey Girl"
  4. "Born to Run" (with Jon Bon Jovi)
3. Billy Crystal
4. Susan Sarandon
5. Roger Waters
  1. "In the Flesh?"
  2. "The Happiest Days of Our Lives"
  3. "Another Brick in the Wall (Part 2)" (featuring a youth dance troupe)
  4. "The Ballad of Jean Charles de Menezes"
  5. "Money"
  6. "Us and Them"
  7. "Comfortably Numb" (with Eddie Vedder)
6. Adam Sandler and Paul Shaffer
  1. "Sandy Screw Ya" (comedic take on Sandy and New York set to "Hallelujah")
7. Brian Williams (with Ben Stiller and Whoopi Goldberg)
8. Billy Crystal
9. Kristen Stewart
  1. Video segment: Jon Bon Jovi in New Jersey
10. Bon Jovi
  1. "It's My Life"
  2. "Wanted Dead or Alive"
  3. "Who Says You Can't Go Home" (with Bruce Springsteen)
  4. "Livin' on a Prayer" (with a cappella intro)
11. Brian Williams (with Tony Danza and Whoopi Goldberg)
12. Jon Stewart
13. Eric Clapton
  1. "Nobody Knows You When You're Down and Out"
  2. "Got to Get Better in a Little While"
  3. "Crossroads"
14. Chelsea Clinton
  1. Video segment of Team Rubicon in the Rockaways
15. Jimmy Fallon
  1. Video segment: Pastor Connie Hula
16. The Rolling Stones
  1. "You Got Me Rocking"
  2. "Jumpin' Jack Flash"
17. Video segment sponsored by Chase
18. Stephen Colbert
19. Sean "Diddy" Combs and Olivia Wilde
20. Alicia Keys
  1. "Brand New Me"
  2. "No One" with several improvised interpolations of "Put your cellphones in the air"
21. Video segment sponsored by State Farm Insurance
22. Steve Buscemi
  1. Video segment: the Graybeards
23. The Who
  1. "Who Are You"
  2. "Bell Boy" (featuring Keith Moon on vocals, via audio from Quadrophenia and archival video from Charlton performance of 18 May 1974)
  3. "Pinball Wizard"
  4. "See Me, Feel Me"
  5. "Baba O'Riley"
  6. "Love, Reign o'er Me"
  7. "Tea & Theatre"
24. Brian Williams (with Joe Pantoliano and James Gandolfini)
25. Video segment: Performers on the aftermath
26. Billy Crystal
27. News 12 New Jersey
28. Video segment: Neighbors in the aftermath, featuring Phyllis Puglia
29. Chris Rock
30. Kanye West (all songs performed as a medley)
  1. "Clique"
  2. "Mercy"
  3. "Power"
  4. "Jesus Walks"
  5. "All of the Lights"
  6. "Run This Town"
  7. "Diamonds from Sierra Leone"
  8. "Diamonds Remix"
  9. "Touch the Sky"
  10. "Gold Digger"
  11. "Good Life"
  12. "Runaway"
  13. "Stronger"
31. Brian Williams (with Jack McBrayer and Jimmy Fallon)
32. Seth Meyers with Bobby Moynihan as "Drunk Uncle"
33. Jake Gyllenhaal with Patricia Farrell
34. Billy Joel
  1. "Miami 2017 (Seen the Lights Go Out on Broadway)"
  2. "Movin' Out (Anthony's Song)"
  3. "Have Yourself a Merry Little Christmas" (portion)
  4. "New York State of Mind"
  5. "The River of Dreams" (featuring "Gloria")
  6. "You May Be Right"
  7. "Only the Good Die Young"
35. Blake Lively
36. Chris Martin of Coldplay
  1. "Viva la Vida"
  2. "Losing My Religion" (with Michael Stipe of R.E.M.)
  3. "Us Against the World"
37. Brian Williams
38. Katie Holmes and Jason Sudeikis
39. Video segment: Red Hook Rising
40. Leonardo DiCaprio (via video)
41. Jamie Foxx, Quentin Tarantino, and Christoph Waltz
42. Paul McCartney
  1. "Helter Skelter"
  2. "Let Me Roll It"
  3. "Nineteen Hundred and Eighty-Five"
  4. "My Valentine" (with Diana Krall)
  5. "Blackbird"
  6. "Cut Me Some Slack" (with Krist Novoselic, Dave Grohl and Pat Smear of Nirvana)
  7. "I've Got a Feeling"
  8. "Live and Let Die"
43. Alicia Keys
  1. "Empire State of Mind (Part II) Broken Down"
44. Billy Crystal

== See also ==
- A Concert for Hurricane Relief
- From the Big Apple to the Big Easy
- Hurricane Sandy
- Hurricane Sandy: Coming Together
- List of highest-grossing benefit concerts
- Mississippi Rising
- The Concert for New York City
