= Salience =

Salience or saliency may refer to:

- Mortality salience, a product of the terror management theory in social psychology
- Motivational salience, a motivational "wanting" attribute given by the brain
- Salience (language), the property of being noticeable or important
- Salience (neuroscience), the perceptual quality by which an observable thing stands out relative to its environment
- Social salience, in social psychology, a set of reasons which draw an observer's attention toward a particular object

== See also ==
- Salient (disambiguation)
