= Michelle Seitz =

American business executive (born 1965)

- Born: July 9, 1965 (age 61)
- Education: Indiana University's Kelley School of Business
- Known for: Former chair and CEO, Russell Investments

Michelle Seitz is an American business executive and investor. She is the former chairman and chief executive officer of Russell Investments. Seitz is one of few women in the world who has led a global asset management firm. She is, according to Barron's, one of the "most influential women in U.S. finance". American Banker lists her as one of the "most powerful women in finance." Prior to her role at Russell Investments, she served on the board of William Blair & Company and as chief executive of William Blair Investment Management. In 2022, she left Russell Investments to launch the investment firm of MeydenVest Partners.

== Early life and education ==
Michelle Seitz grew up in Lawrenceburg, Indiana, and her parents divorced when she was four years old. She decided to pursue a career in finance while on a high school class trip to the Chicago Board of Trade. She graduated from the Kelley School of Business at Indiana University in 1987 with a B.S. in accounting. Seitz became a Chartered Financial Analyst in 1990.

== Career ==
Seitz began her career in 1987 as a portfolio manager at NationsBank in Charlotte, North Carolina. She received the firm's "rookie of the year" award in 1988 for best performance. From 1992 to 1996, she was a senior portfolio manager at Concord Investment Company.

=== William Blair & Company ===
Seitz joined William Blair & Company as a senior portfolio manager in 1996 and was promoted to partner in 1999. In 2001, Seitz was named CEO of William Blair Investment Management (WBIM), which she grew to become the company's largest division. Serving as WBIM's CEO for 16 years, Seitz ran the institutional, mutual fund, and private wealth management businesses. She also served on the executive committee and corporate board of William Blair and as the chairman and president of William Blair Funds. To increase diversity at the firm, Seitz instituted a policy requiring at least half of all interview candidates must be either women or ethnic minorities.

=== Russell Investments ===
In September 2017, Seitz left William Blair in Chicago to join Seattle-based Russell Investments as CEO. She was appointed chairman of the board the following January. She hired a new chief operating officer, and global chief investment officer, and invested heavily in technology to reduce inefficiencies, with a goal of lowering costs and improving returns for clients.

Seitz is the seventh CEO and the first woman chief executive since Russell Investments' founding in 1936. She is one of few women leading global investment firms worldwide.

In 2019 and 2020, Seitz was featured on American Banker's "Most Powerful Women in Finance" and "Most Powerful Women in Banking" lists. She was named to Puget Sound Business Journal's 2019 "Power 100" list of top business leaders in the Puget Sound region. Barron's named Seitz one of the "100 Most Influential Women in U.S. Finance" in 2020.

=== MeydenVest Partners ===
In September 2022, Seitz left Russell Investments to launch her own investment form, MeydenVest Partners.

== Other roles ==
Seitz is a founding member and donor to All In Seattle, a fund supporting nonprofit organizations during the COVID-19 pandemic, and a founding co-chair of the Chicago Council's Women and Global Development Forum, which encourages "inclusive global development practices" and supports women "advancing into leadership roles".

Seitz serves on the boards of the Washington Roundtable and Indiana University Kelley School of Business. She has served on the board of trustees of the Financial Accounting Foundation and chaired the organization's Finance and Compensation Committee.

== Personal life ==
Seitz relocated from Chicago, Illinois to Seattle, Washington with her family in 2018. She is married and has five children.
