= Foundation for the Study of Cycles =

International nonprofit research organization

The Foundation for the Study of Cycles (FSC) is an international nonprofit organization that fosters, promotes, and conducts scientific research in respect to rhythmic and periodic fluctuations in any branch of science. It was incorporated on January 10, 1941 by Edward R. Dewey. It is currently under the directorship of Dr. Richard Smith. FSC published the Cycles Magazine from 1950 until 1997. In 2020, FSC relaunched the magazine as a quarterly publication. All FSC members are provided access to Cycles App, which according to the foundation, is "a tool that can decode cycles and apply cyclic analysis to detect dominant cycles in any dataset."

The FSC has been backed over the years by notable investors, like W. Clement Stone, Fidelity Investments, Coleman Co., and Paul Tudor Jones.

== See also ==
- Chaos theory
- Fourier series
- Harmonic analysis
- List of cycles
- Periodic function
- Sine wave
