= Castleton Commodities International =

US-based commodity trading company

Castleton Commodities International LLC
- Formerly: Louis Dreyfus Highbridge Energy LLC (LDH Energy)
- Company type: Private
- Industry: Commodity
- Founded: 1997; 28 years ago
- Headquarters: Stamford, Connecticut, United States
- Area served: Global
- Products: Energy / Raw materials / Merchant
- Owner: Glenn Dubin; Paul Tudor Jones; Timothy Barakett
- Number of employees: 650 (2015)
- Website: www.cci.com

Castleton Commodities International, LLC (CCI) is a privately held global merchant firm that is involved in commodity trading and is active in a wide spectrum of global energy markets. Under the name Louis Dreyfus Energy, the company was formed in 1997 by the Louis Dreyfus Company as a subsidiary to trade energy. By 2006 Louis Dreyfus Energy was ranked as one of the 10 largest natural gas marketers within the United States. The company has worldwide interests covering "the physical delivery of petroleum and natural gas as well as financial interests in energy". Headquartered in Stamford, Connecticut, CCI has offices in Calgary, Canada; Houston, Texas; Geneva, Switzerland; London, United Kingdom; and Singapore.

In 2006 Highbridge Capital Management, a New York based hedge fund, invested as a joint venture in Louis Dreyfus Group to increase their access to and control of energy delivery within trading markets. The joint venture was called Louis Dreyfus Highbridge Energy LLC (LDH Energy).

In October 2012, it was announced that Glenn Dubin, Paul Tudor Jones and Timothy Barakett were among a group of investors buying the merchant energy operation Louis Dreyfus Highbridge Energy ("LDH Energy") from Louis Dreyfus and Highbridge. The reason for Louis Dreyfus to sell LDH Energy was it sought to raise capital to expand its agriculture trading business. The new company was named Castleton Commodities International, LLC where Glenn Dubin as of 2012 is the lead shareholder.

In 2015, Castleton Commodities International acquired Morgan Stanley’s Global Oil Merchanting Business for an undisclosed sum.
