= Eva Andersson-Dubin =

American physician and model from Sweden

- Born: Eva Birgitta Andersson; 1961 (age 64–65); Uddevalla, Sweden
- Education: Karolinska Institute (No degree); UCLA School of Medicine (MD, 1989); Lenox Hill Hospital (Internship, 1990)
- Occupations: Model, physician
- Years active: 1980s – early 1990s (as model); 1989 – present (as doctor)
- Employer: Mount Sinai Hospital
- Spouse: Glenn Dubin (m. 1994)
- Partner: Jeffrey Epstein (1980s)
- Children: 3
- Awards: Miss Sweden 1980; 4th runner-up Miss Universe 1980
- Modeling information
- Hair color: Blonde
- Agency: Ford Models

Eva Birgitta Andersson-Dubin (born 1961) is a Swedish physician, former model, and beauty pageant titleholder. She is the founder of the Dubin Breast Center at the Tisch Cancer Institute at Mount Sinai Hospital in New York City. She is married to hedge fund billionaire Glenn Dubin. She worked as a model and won Miss Sweden 1980.

== Career ==
Born in Sweden, Andersson-Dubin earned a high school diploma from Östraboskolan (Östrabo school) in Uddevalla, where she was pre-med and graduated first in her class. While in school, she pursued a career in modeling and in 1980 was named Miss Sweden and placed fourth runner-up in the Miss Universe 1980 contest. Gerard W. Ford, the co-founder of Ford Models, discovered Andersson while she was walking down a street in New York City. He took her to meet his co-founder and wife, Eileen Ford, and Andersson became a Ford Model. Andersson was entered into the 1980 Miss Sweden contest without her knowledge and won. In 1981, she placed third in the Miss Scandinavia contest.

She hosted Melodifestivalen 1985, the annual song competition where the Swedish entry is selected for the Eurovision Song Contest.

She attended Karolinska Institutet in Stockholm for three and a half years and in 1985 transferred to UCLA's School of Medicine, where she earned her MD in 1989. She completed an internship in internal medicine at Lenox Hill Hospital in New York in 1990.

== Personal life ==
Andersson dated Jeffrey Epstein from 1981 to 1990. In the early 1990s, she was first seen by her future husband Glenn Dubin in a modeling photo in the New York Post's Page Six section. The couple married in 1994 and have three children.

Andersson-Dubin was diagnosed with breast cancer in 2002. In 2004 she joined the Mt. Sinai Board of Trustees and began work to create the Dubin Breast Center at Mount Sinai Hospital, which opened in 2011. She and her husband donated approximately $19 million and were involved in raising an additional $24 million for the center, where breast cancer diagnosis and treatment are integrated under one roof. According to The Wall Street Journal, as both a patient and a physician, she contributed to many aspects of the center's development. As of 2018, the center had processed 180,000 patient visits.

== Relationship with Jeffrey Epstein ==
Jeffrey Epstein was godfather to Andersson-Dubin's children. She continued to "socialize with Epstein after his time in jail" for pleading guilty in 2008 to a state charge of procuring for prostitution a female under the age of 18, later telling Epstein's probation officer that she was "100% comfortable with" Epstein being around her children. In 2021, Andersson-Dubin testified in Ghislaine Maxwell's defense, saying Maxwell "had never taken part in a group sexual encounter as one of the prosecution witnesses had suggested".

Awards and achievements
Preceded by Annette Marie Ekström	Miss Sweden for Miss Universe; 1980	Succeeded by Eva-Lena Lundgren
