= Russell Investments =

Investment firm headquartered in Seattle, Washington

Russell Investments Group LLC
- Type: Private
- Industry: Financial services
- Founded: 1936; 90 years ago in Tacoma, Washington, U.S.
- Founder: Frank Russell
- Headquarters: Russell Investments Center, Seattle, Washington, U.S.
- Key people: Zach Buchwald (CEO, chairman)
- AUM: $418 billion (August 2026)
- Number of employees: 1,350 (2019)
- Website: russellinvestments.com

Russell Investments Group LLC is an American investment firm headquartered in Seattle, Washington.

As of August 2026, Russell Investments has approximately $418 billion in assets under management. Additionally, the company has $2.6 trillion under advisement across 32 countries, making Russell Investments the world's fourth-largest adviser. The company has an investment outsourcing division to assist clients with investment and retirement portfolios, among other services. Clients have included AT&T, Boeing, and Union Pacific Railroad.

Russell Investments had approximately 1,350 employees, as of late 2019. The majority are based in Seattle, while others work at offices in London, New York City, Sydney, Tokyo, and Toronto, among other cities.

== History ==
Founded by Frank Russell in 1936 in Tacoma, Washington, Russell Investments began as a stockbroker and consultant, and later created the Russell 2000 Index, one of the most followed stock market indices in the U.S. His grandson, George Russell, has been credited with expanding the company and pioneering the business of pension consulting when he secured J. C. Penney as the first pension client.

Northwestern Mutual acquired Russell Investments during 1998–1999 for $1.2 billion. The company's headquarters were relocated to Seattle in 2010.

In 2014, London Stock Exchange Group (LSEG) acquired the firm for $2.7 billion. Russell Investments had approximately $256 billion in assets under management at the time. LSEG separated the Russell Indexes from other Frank Russell group companies doing business as Russell Investments, such as asset management and consulting, opting to retain the former and sell the latter. LSEG announced the FTSE Russell brand in May 2015.

During 2015–2016, the company was valued at $1.15 billion and purchased by TA Associates, a Boston-based private equity firm, from LSEG. TA hired Goldman Sachs in 2019 to assess Russell Investments' possible sale.

In July 2026, a consortium led by B Capital Group and the California Public Employees' Retirement System (CalPERS) agreed to acquire Russell Investments in a transaction reportedly valued at approximately US$2.8 billion.

=== Leadership ===
George Russell was chairman until 2002. Craig Ueland was promoted from chief operating officer to president in 2003. He succeeded Mike Phillips, who also was chairman, as chief executive officer (CEO) in 2004. Ueland was CEO until 2008, when Northwestern Mutual's John Schlifske was named president and CEO. Andrew S. Doman was CEO from early 2009, and was succeeded by Len Brennan in 2011. Michelle Seitz became the company's first female CEO, and seventh overall, in September 2017. Four months later, she became the chairman as well, working in both roles until September 2022. In February 2023, it was announced that Zach Buchwald, then head of BlackRock's institutional business, would join Russell as CEO. Kate El-Hillow has been president and chief investment officer since 2022.

== Products and services ==
=== Investment management ===
The firm provides model portfolios through financial advisers and other intermediaries. As of 2025, it was ranked among the top five third-party model portfolio vendors by Cerulli Associates.

=== Private markets ===
In April 2025, Reach Alternative Investments entered into a partnership with Russell Investments involving wholesale private-market investments in Australia. The partnership included the Reach Global Private Infrastructure Fund, which invests through the Russell Investments Global Unlisted Infrastructure Fund.

=== ETFs ===
In 2025, the firm launched five actively managed US exchange-traded funds covering US small-cap equities, international developed-market equities, global equities, emerging-market equities, and global infrastructure. In June 2026, the firm added two more actively managed ETFs, covering global real estate and global bonds respectively.

=== Institutional services ===
The firm provides outsourced chief investment officer (OCIO) and investment implementation services to institutional investors. The firm works with external asset managers to construct multi-manager portfolios under an open-architecture model.

== See also ==
- List of asset management firms
