= Charitybuzz =

- Company type: Private
- Founded: 2005
- Headquarters: New York City, USA
- Key people: Ben Erwin (CEO); Patrick Farrell (COO); Todd Wagner (Owner and Founder The Charity Network); Coppy Holzman (Founder)
- Industry: Ecommerce
- Website: charitybuzz.com

Charitybuzz is an internet company that sells and auctions off access to experiences and items to raise funds for nonprofit organizations. Charitybuzz experiences include music, entertainment, business, politics, sports, art, fashion and other industries.

The company was originally founded in 2005 and has raised more than $550 million for charities as of 2022.

== History ==
Coppy Holzman founded Charitybuzz out of his Westport, Connecticut, home in April 2005 with partners Serena Chew and Brad Reisner. After a conversation with Chevy Chase and President Bill Clinton at a reception to benefit the Clinton Library in late 2004. They launched Charitybuzz a few months later with one employee and a directive from Chase to raise funds for The Center for Environmental Education. Holzman and his team persuaded 70 celebrities and luxury brands into donating meet-and-greets, VIP tickets, vacations and other gifts for the company's first auction. The first experience auctioned was a Caddyshack golf outing with Bill Murray and Chase. After a segment with Chase on the TODAY show, the online auction site raised $250,000 within two weeks. After its initial success, Charitybuzz's business grew quickly through word of mouth.

Holzman ran Charitybuzz part-time until the fall of 2007, when he committed to operating the business full-time and moved the company out of his home and into an office space. In 2008, he registered Charitybuzz as a sub-chapter S in Delaware.

Soon after, during the height of the recession in 2009, the company marked $100 million in bids and one million unique visitors. By 2010, with more than 1,500 online charity auctions complete, Charitybuzz doubled in size by expanding its focus to include corporate philanthropy support. The company subsequently moved its headquarters and staff from Connecticut to an 8,000 square foot office at 437 Fifth Avenue in New York City.

In early 2012, Charitybuzz added Macy's chief stores officer Peter Sachse to its board of directors. In 2012, Charitybuzz launched a new celebrity concierge service for charity called "Do Good Dream Big," where bidders could request customized celebrity access for a minimum donation of $20,000.

In September 2013, Patrick Farrell was appointed chief operating officer, a new position within Charitybuzz

In November 2013, Charitybuzz marked $100 million raised for nonprofits and celebrated by ringing the bell at the New York Stock Exchange on Black Friday.

In 2014, Charitybuzz raised $30 million for its nonprofit partners, bringing its total raised since inception in 2005 to $130 million. Celebrities including Bruce Springsteen and Matthew McConaughey supported their favorite causes to raise money for organizations including the RFK Center for Justice and Human Rights, Gabrielle's Angel Foundation for Cancer Research, WhyHunger, Sweet Relief Musicians Fund, The Kristen Ann Carr Fund and more. The top lots from 2014 included the opportunity to meet Sir Paul McCartney backstage which sold for $105,000 for the MTV Staying Alive Foundation and Coffee with Journey's Steve Perry which sold for $75,000 to benefit City of Hope.

In 2015, Charitybuzz was acquired by entrepreneur Todd Wagner, co-founder of Broadcast.com and co-owner of 2929 Entertainment.

In 2020, Charitybuzz launched its buy-now Shop, expanding beyond the auction format.

As of 2022, Charitybuzz reports to have raised funds for 4,500 beneficiaries, and hosted campaigns involving SpaceX, Ford, Reebok, IWC, Corona, Warner Bros Discovery, and Mattel/Barbie, along with nonprofits such as St. Jude Children's Research Hospital, Code.org. In 2022, Ben Erwin was named CEO of the Charitybuzz businesses.

== Business model ==
By auctioning luxury items and celebrity-backed experiences through the internet to bidders and shoppers worldwide, Charitybuzz is able to raise funds for foundations and nonprofits. Charitybuzz's staff of 60 provides services for nonprofit clients, as well as cause marketing support for many for-profit brands looking to enhance their corporate philanthropy programs. At the end of each charity auction, Charitybuzz keeps 20 percent to cover its operating costs.

== Notable offerings auctioned ==
In 2010, the following items were auctioned off: first Chevrolet Volt off the production line; Audemars Piguet Royal Oak Offshore Las Vegas Strip Tourbillon Limited Edition Watch signed by Jay-Z; Audemars Piguet Lady Millenary Astrologia Limited Edition Watch signed by Meryl Streep; meet-and-greet with Paul McCartney at the Apollo Theater; meet-and-greet with Robert Pattinson on the set of Twilight: Breaking Dawn; game of golf with Tom Watson; game of golf with President Bill Clinton; backstage tour of U2's The Edge; meet-and-greet with Prince William at the Chakravarty Cup; watch Simon Doonan create the Barney's Christmas windows; invitation to Sir Elton John Oscar party; meet-and-greet with Ralph Lauren at New York Fashion Week; customized portrait by Shepard Fairey; week internship at Vogue and meet Anna Wintour; meet-and-greet with James Cameron at a private viewing of Avatar.

In 2011, the following auctions took place: spend a day shadowing former President Bill Clinton; meet-and-greet with Oprah Winfrey before the last taping of her talk show; attend both the Elton John AIDS Foundation Dinner and the Vanity Fair Oscar Party;(2011) idea pitch to Rupert Murdoch; a private singing with Paul Simon; front-row VIP seats to a Paul McCartney concert at Yankee Stadium; behind-the-scenes tour of Facebook's headquarters with Company Director Blake Ross; meet German designer Karl Lagerfeld at the Chanel Couture fashion show in Paris; join Harrison Ford as his co-pilot during a flight over California; walk-on role on AMC's Mad Men; sit in on The Howard Stern Show at Sirius Radio and meet the host; Lady Gaga's signed Steinway Piano, used during her performance for the Robin Hood Foundation gala; courtside seats with Jay-Z at a Nets vs. Knicks game; meet Taylor Swift backstage at a concert.

In 2012, the following auctions occurred: spend a day with President Bill Clinton in New York City; meet-and-greet with Bono after backstage show of U2; meet-and-greet with Taylor Swift in Ottawa with two VIP concert tickets and round trip airfare; sit ringside with Mike Tyson at the Pacquiao vs. Marquez fight; lunch with George Clooney and Dace Karger; lunch with Michael R. Bloomberg; lifetime membership to all Current and future Trump National Golf Courses; meet Jeremy Lin after watching the Knicks at Madison Square Garden from VIP seats and take home his game-worn jersey; private one-hour tennis lesson with Andre Agassi and Stefanie Graf.

In 2013, the following auctions took place: coffee date with Apple CEO Tim Cook at Apple Headquarters in Cupertino, CA; Lamborghini Aventador; private tennis lesson with Rafael Nadal; lunch date with Yahoo! CEO Marissa Mayer at Yahoo!´s headquarters; cameo role in the Superman vs. Batman film with Ben Affleck, Henry Cavill and Amy Adams; lunch date with Julia Robert at the Soho House West Hollywood; sit in on The Howard Stern Show; meet-and-greet with Katy Perry.

In 2014, the following auctions occurred: coffee date with Steve Perry in Los Angeles; meet-and-greet with Justin Timberlake, backstage meet-and-greet with Paul McCartney at a US concert; lunch date with Apple's CVP of Software and Services Eddy Cue at Apple Headquarters; meet-and-greet with Jim Carrey at the Dumb and Dumber To premiere; visit the Fast Money set and meet Melissa Lee; signed guitar used by Dave Matthews in 1991 – 1992; lunch date with Ben Bernanke, the former chairman of the Federal Reserve to benefit the Robert F. Kennedy Center for Justice and Human Rights.

In 2015, Charitybuzz auctioned a LeBron James Customized 2015 Kia K900 Luxury Sedan to benefit LeBron James Family Foundation. The final bid was $111.000. The same year, a lunch with Apple CEO Tim Cook was auctioned to benefit the Robert F. Kennedy Center for Justice and Human Rights. The final bid was $200,000. A caddy for Rickie Fowler at the Farmer's Insurance Open Pro-Am in La Jolla, CA was also auctioned to benefit Communities in School and DonorsChoose. The final bid was $17,000.

In 2016, the Holy Popemobile! (the Fiat that drove Pope Francis through NYC) was auctioned. Proceeds supported Catholic schools and charities, as well as the international organizations Catholic Relief Services and Catholic Near East Welfare Association. The final bid was $300,000.

In 2017, Charitybuzz auctioned a lunch with Apple's services chief Eddy Cue at the company's newly constructed Apple Park headquarters. The final bid was $26,000.

2020 notable auctions: Be one of the first to own a 2021 Limited First-Edition Ford Bronco; final bid: $155,000. Meet Eddie Vedder with two VIP tickets and photo opportunity at a Pearl Jam summer 2021 show; final bid: $111,000. VIP meet-and-greet with social media megastars Charli and Dixie D'Amelio featuring you and the duo in an original TikTok; final bid: $95,000.

== Awards ==
The Charity Network was named one of Fast Company's Most Innovative Companies in the not-for-profit space in 2017.
