= Partners Capital =

Financial services company specializing as Outside Investment Manager

Partners Capital Investment Group
- Type: Privately held company
- Industry: Outsourced investment management
- Founded: 2001; 25 years ago
- Founders: Stan Miranda, Paul Dimitruk
- Headquarters: London, United Kingdom
- Key people: Arjun Raghavan (CEO)
- AUM: US$75 billion (May 2026)
- Number of employees: More than 370 (2025)
- Website: www.partners-cap.com

Partners Capital Investment Group is a privately held global investment firm that provides outsourced investment management.

== History ==
Partners Capital acts as the OCIO to endowments, foundations and high-net-worth private clients. Its private clients include senior partners and founders of investment firms.

The firm was founded in London in 2001 by Stan Miranda and Paul Dimitruk. In 2009, the firm added three Cambridge college endowments as clients. Arjun Raghavan became chief executive in July 2020.

The firm invests client assets through external fund managers. Its investment activities include private equity, private credit and real estate.

In February 2024, General Atlantic agreed to acquire a minority stake in Partners Capital. The investment involved buying part of the holdings of early shareholders, including the Rothschild Foundation and Ronald Cohen, who retained stakes in the firm. General Atlantic invested through a fund.

In 2011, the firm was expanding into Asia. Partners Capital opened an office in Dallas in January 2025 and its first office in Abu Dhabi in May 2026. As of September 2026, the firm has offices in London, Boston, New York, San Francisco, Dallas, Paris, Singapore, Hong Kong, Dubai, Abu Dhabi and Zürich.

== Operations ==
Prior to Partners Capital, Stan Miranda was a director at Bain & Company. Paul Dimitruk was previously chief executive of asset manager Pareto Partners.
