= Tudor Investment Corporation =

American investment firm

- Type: Private
- Industry: Investment management
- Founded: November 1980; 45 years ago
- Founder: Paul Tudor Jones
- Headquarters: Stamford, Connecticut, U.S.
- Products: Hedge funds Alternative investments Venture Capital
- AUM: US$106 billion (2026)
- Number of employees: 406 (2025)
- Website: tudor.com

Tudor Investment Corporation is an American investment firm based in Stamford, Connecticut. The firm invests in both public and private markets globally.

== History ==
In 1980, Paul Tudor Jones founded the Tudor Investment Corporation. Commodities Corporation was one of the first clients to invest into the firm where it provided $30,000 to manage.

On the day of Black Monday, October 19, 1987, Jones accurately predicted there would be a stock market crash. The Dow Jones Industrial Average plunged 22 per cent on that day while the firm from short positions earned a 62% gain for the month of October and 200 per cent gain for the year of 1987.

In February 1990, Jones bought put options for the Japanese stock market. When the market plunged, the firm had a return of 87.4 per cent for that year.

In 1996 the firm agreed to pay fines to the U.S. Securities and Exchange Commission totalling $800,000, the second-largest ever levied at the time for a non-fraud case, for violating the uptick rule, part of the Securities Exchange Act of 1934 that prohibits the sale of a borrowed stock while the stock is declining. The trades in question were performed on March 15 and 16, 1994. The SEC charged that the trades made had pushed the Dow Jones Industrial Average down 16 points in a single day.

In 2014, The New York Times noted that returns for the firm's clients had "dimmed" over the decade and that the returns could not match the same level as before. From 2010 to 2012, the firm returned just 5 per cent annually.

In 2016, the firm laid off 15 per cent of its staff due to poor returns and investor redemptions. In that year investors pulled out over $1 billion from the firm. The firm also had to cut fees.

In 2022, Jones stated that the firm will be increasing its trading in cryptocurrencies as a way to protect against rising inflation.
