= Balyasny Asset Management =

American investment management firm

Balyasny Asset Management L.P.
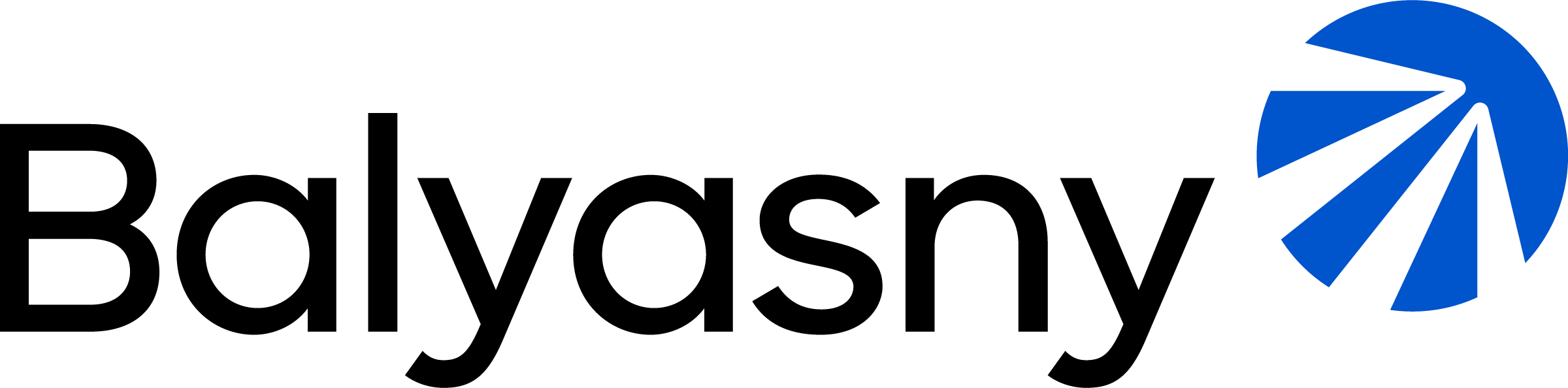

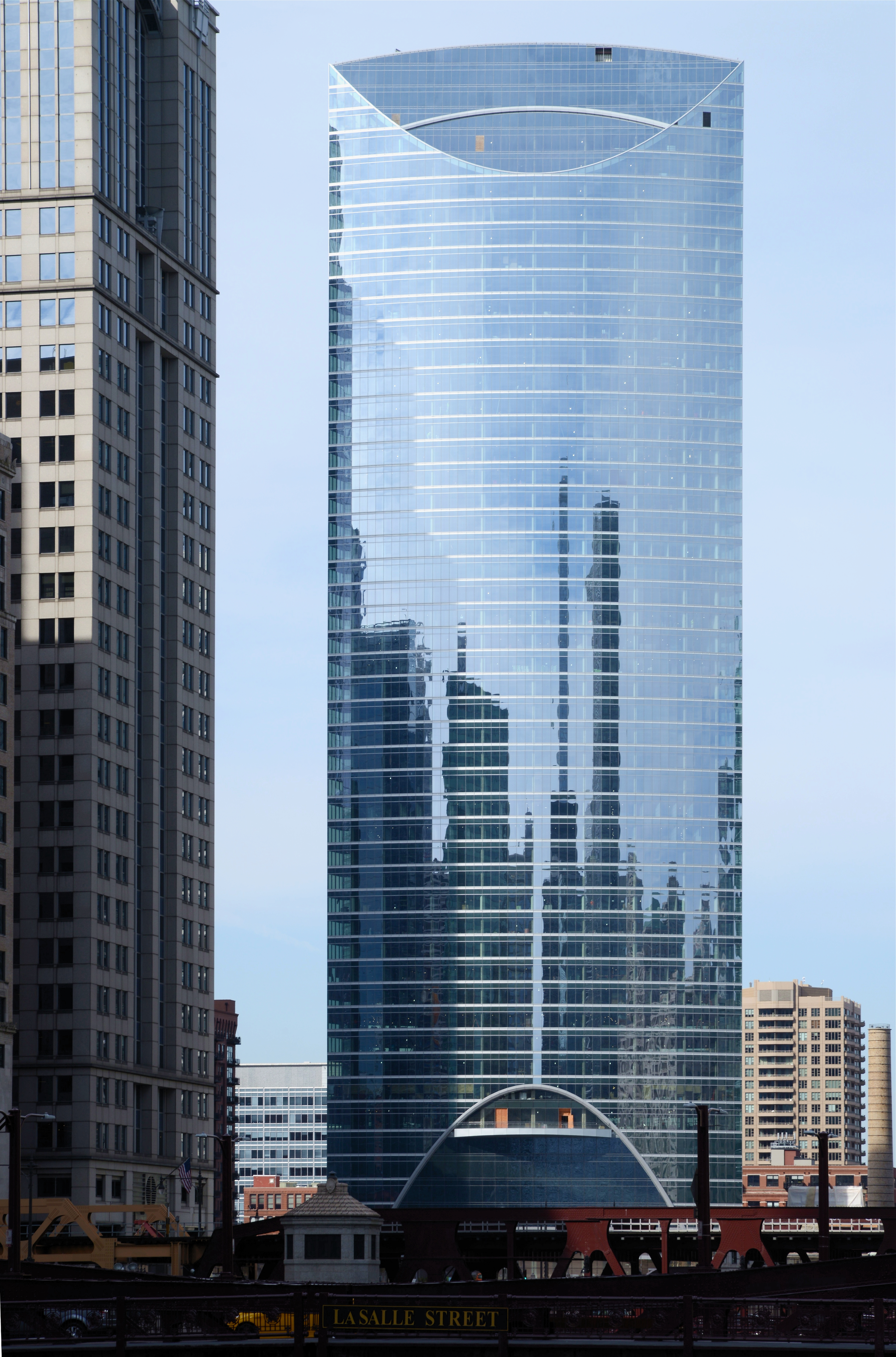
- Headquarters at River Point
- Company type: Private
- Industry: Investment management
- Founded: 2001; 25 years ago
- Founders: Dmitry Balyasny; Scott Schroeder; Taylor O'Malley
- Headquarters: River Point, Chicago, Illinois, U.S.
- Products: Hedge funds Alternative investments Growth equity
- AUM: US$32 billion (2026)
- Number of employees: 2,000 (2025)
- Website: bamfunds.com

Balyasny Asset Management (BAM) is an American investment management firm headquartered in Chicago, with additional offices in Canada, Europe and Asia.

== History ==
Balyasny Asset Management was founded in 2001 in Chicago by Dmitry Balyasny, Scott Schroeder and Taylor O'Malley. As of the end of 2024, 40-50% of the firm's risk was in equities.

The firm named its flagship hedge fund "Atlas Enhanced," after the pro-capitalist book Atlas Shrugged by Ayn Rand.

In November 2009, Balyasny Asset Management ran an internal investigation focused on a former analyst at the firm who was suspected of passing on insider information about EMC Corporation to a hedge fund manager who pleaded guilty in the Galleon Group case. The firm sent a letter to investors reassuring them that no improper activity had been discovered, and that it had decided to close the satellite office and terminate the individual involved. In 2010, it was reported that Balyasny Asset Management had been added to a group of firms being examined in a wide-ranging investigation into insider trading led by the government, relating to the Galleon case.

Mark Adams, an analyst at the firm, was suspected of passing on insider information about EMC Corporation to Steven Fortuna, a money manager who pled guilty in the Galleon Group case.

For the first 16 years since its foundation, it delivered an annualized return of 12%. However, in 2018, the firm experienced unprecedented significant difficulty, posting large performance losses, with its assets under management (AUM) dropping by half from $12 billion to $6 billion and client investors withdrawing their money from the firm. Balyasny himself sent out an email to the firm's staff with the subject line "Adapt or Die" that bluntly stated that "we are getting our butts kicked" and the firm's performance "sucks". In the email, he also stated he didn't feel a "palpable sense of urgency" on the trading floor and mentioned that investors were wondering if staff joined the firm "so they can enjoy not working too hard". This email wound up in the hands of Kenneth C. Griffin, the founder and CEO of Citadel LLC. Balyasny Asset Management and Citadel LLC were hedge fund rivals as they were both based in Chicago at the time and spent a lot of money in a talent war where they would both try to poach each other's employees. Griffin used this email in an internal town hall meeting for employees, telling them this was an example of what happens when a firm has poor culture. Balyasny Asset Management then cut 125 jobs, which was around 20% of the firm's workforce. Balyasny stated that the mistakes in 2018 were caused by undue caution and a tough environment for long/short equity.

Since then, the firm underwent some significant changes including: hiring a surplus of staff, changing the firm's risk management approach and transitioning to institutional investors as clients rather than high-net-worth individuals. By 2019, the firm was back into profitability.

In February 2022, Balyasny stated the firm was investing in private startups, a trend done by other hedge fund peers, such as Tiger Global Management and Coatue Management. That same year, the firm started BAM Elevate, a growth capital unit focused on late-stage venture and growth-stage companies on a trajectory to IPO.

In March 2022, the firm announced it would create a new equities unit called Corbets Capital, with offices in New York and Greenwich, Connecticut.

In 2023, Balyasny opened an office in Dubai. That same year, the firm switched to longer "lock-ups" for investors' capital, ensuring a minimum of two years for withdrawals.

In June 2023, the firm released its own version of ChatGPT to its employees, and, in January 2024, it was reported that the hedge fund was building an AI equivalent of a senior analyst. By August 2024, the firm's chatbots were completing research and analysis, and an internal AI team had grown to 12 members. The company also began training analysts in data science and AI.

Dmitry Balyasny has led the firm's equities department since October 2023. In December 2023, the company said that more than half its assets under management were diversified into strategies including early stage investing, commodities, and macro.

In 2025, the company launched BAM Corner Point, its first dedicated venture fund, to focus on early-stage enterprise technology companies.

As of September 2025, BAM has 19 partners, down from 23 in 2024.
