= Highbridge Capital Management =

Alternative investment management firm

Highbridge Capital Management, LLC
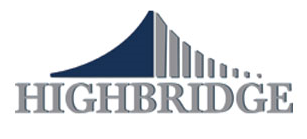
- Type: Subsidiary
- Industry: Hedge fund
- Founded: 1992; 34 years ago
- Founders: Glenn Dubin; Henry Swieca
- Headquarters: 277 Park Avenue; New York, New York, United States
- AUM: $4 billion (2022)
- Owner: JPMorgan Chase
- Number of employees: 300
- Website: www.highbridge.com

Highbridge Capital Management, LLC is a multi-strategy alternative investment management firm founded by Glenn Dubin and Henry Swieca in 1992. In 2004, it was purchased by JPMorgan Chase; as of 2019, it had about $3.9 billion in assets under management, out of $150 billion in JPMorgan's global alternatives division.

== History ==
The firm was founded in 1992, by childhood friends Glenn Dubin and Henry Swieca. The company started with $35 million in capital and is named after the 19th-century aqueduct that connects Washington Heights and the Bronx. In 2004, J.P. Morgan Asset Management purchased 55% ownership of the firm, and then substantially all the remaining shares in 2009.

The company maintains offices in New York and London. The firm operates as a subsidiary of J.P. Morgan Asset Management.

In October 2015, it was reported that JPMorgan Chase was nearing a deal to sell the firm's private equity business.

In 2019 the $2 billion multi-strategy fund was restructured into a credit-focused fund. As part of the change, one of the four lead portfolio managers, Arjun Menon, left the company while Mark Vanacore, Jon Segal and Jason Hempel remained with the fund. Fifty-two people were laid off as it was restructured.

=== Investments ===
In 2006 Highbridge invested as a joint venture in Louis Dreyfus Company to increase its access to and control of energy delivery within trading markets. The joint venture was called Louis Dreyfus Highbridge Energy LLC (LDH Energy). In October 2012 Highbridge exited the position as it was announced that Glenn Dubin, Paul Tudor Jones and Timothy Barakett were among a group of investors buying the merchant energy operation Louis Dreyfus Highbridge Energy ("LDH Energy") from Louis Dreyfus and Highbridge. The reason for Louis Dreyfus to sell LDH Energy was it sought to raise capital to expand its agriculture trading business. The new company was named Castleton Commodities International, LLC where Dubin as of 2012 is the lead shareholder.

Following the Highbridge/J.P. Morgan partnership, Highbridge announced in October 2010 the purchase of a majority interest in Gávea Investimentos, a leading alternative-asset management company in Brazil. Gávea was co-founded in 2003 by Chairman and Chief Investment Officer Arminio Fraga, former President of the Central Bank of Brazil.

== Assets under management ==
Year	AUM in Bil. USD
2006	14
2007	11
2008	4
2011	27

== See also ==
- Brooke Harlow - Former Managing Director.
