= David Puth =

American financial services executive

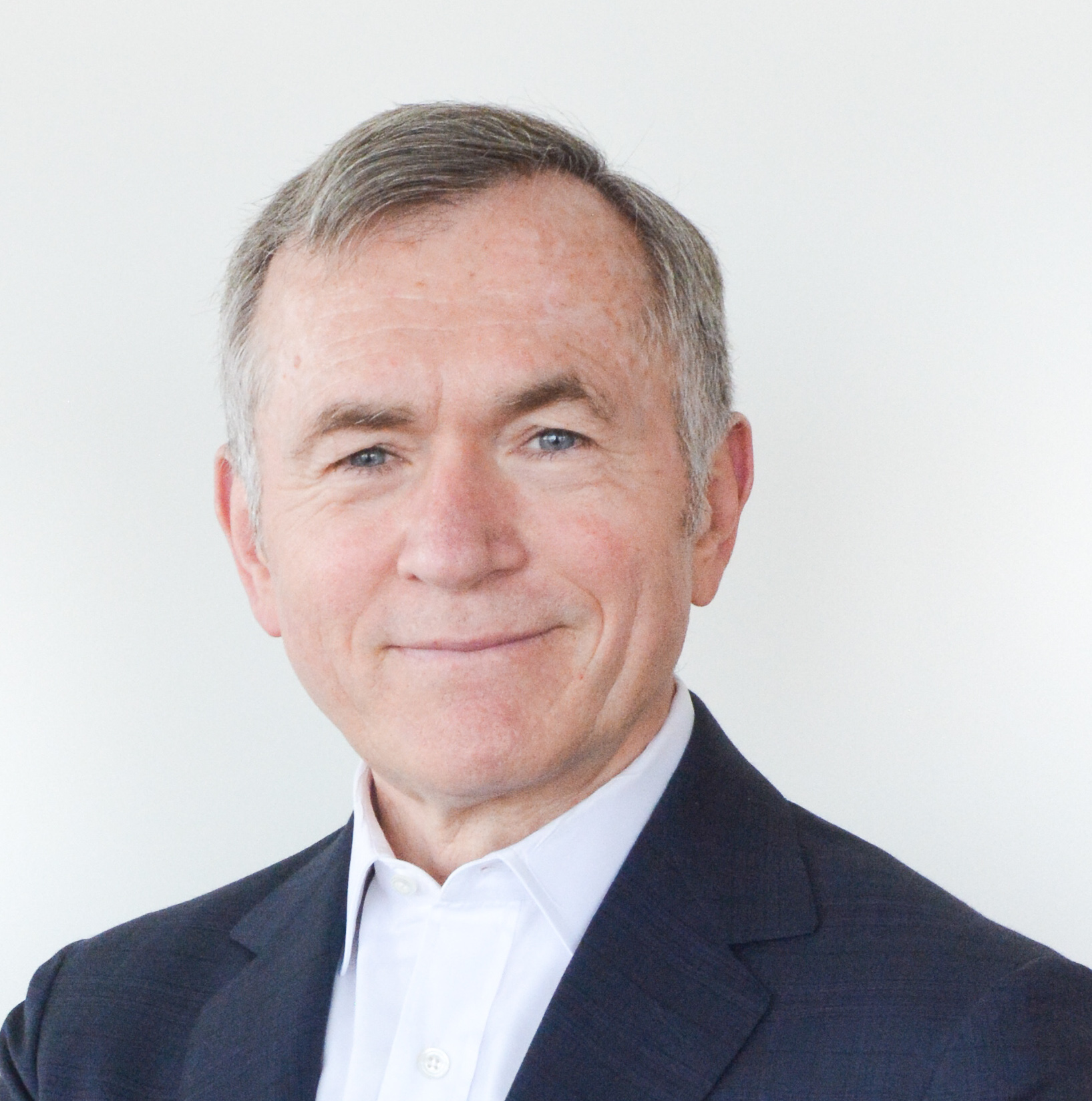
- David Puth
- Education: Tufts University in Boston
- Occupation: Business executive
- Spouse: Leslie Puth

David Puth is an American financial services executive who has held senior positions at several financial service companies. He is the vice chairman of Partners Capital.

He was chief executive officer of USD Coin (USDC) standards body, Centre from 2020 until Centre was absorbed by Circle. Between 1988 and 2007, he worked at J.P. Morgan where he was in a variety of senior global leadership roles.

Puth is a former member of the New York Federal Reserve Foreign Exchange Committee, the Bank of England Joint Standing Committee and former chairman of the Bank of International Settlements' Market Participants Group where he led the foreign exchange (FX) market's input to the development of a single global code of conduct covering the FX market.

Puth was a member of the Foreign Exchange Committee, sponsored by the Federal Reserve Bank of New York, which he chaired from 1992 to 2002.

== Education ==
Puth studied Political Science and Government at Tufts University in Boston, graduating with a Bachelor of Arts degree in 1979.

== Career ==
Puth worked at J.P. Morgan from 1988 to 2007, where he worked in a variety of senior global leadership roles with oversight of the bank's FX, interest rate derivatives, commodities and emerging markets businesses. He held several senior roles at the bank including Global Head of Currencies and Commodities until November 15, 2006. He also was a managing director and was a member of J.P. Morgan Chase' Executive Committee.

In 2008, Puth joined State Street as Executive Vice President and Head of Global Markets where he oversaw sales, trading and investment research across multiple asset classes. He was also responsible for Currenex, State Street's electronic foreign exchange brokerage arm.

Puth was chief executive officer (CEO) and Director at CLS Group from 2012 to 2018. CLS is a specialist financial system that provides settlement services to its members in the foreign exchange market to mitigate settlement risk.

In 2016, Puth was the chair of the Market Participants Group for the drafting of the Bank of International Settlements Global FX Code of Conduct for the foreign exchange market.

In this role, he was responsible for leading the market participants input to create a voluntary code of conduct for all wholesale foreign exchange market participants.

The Code was published in two halves, the first on May 26, 2016 and the second on May 25, 2017.

In 2020 Puth was appointed chief executive officer (CEO) to Centre in 2020 until it was absorbed by Circle (company) in 2023.
