= Paul Tudor Jones =

American hedge fund manager and investor (born 1954)

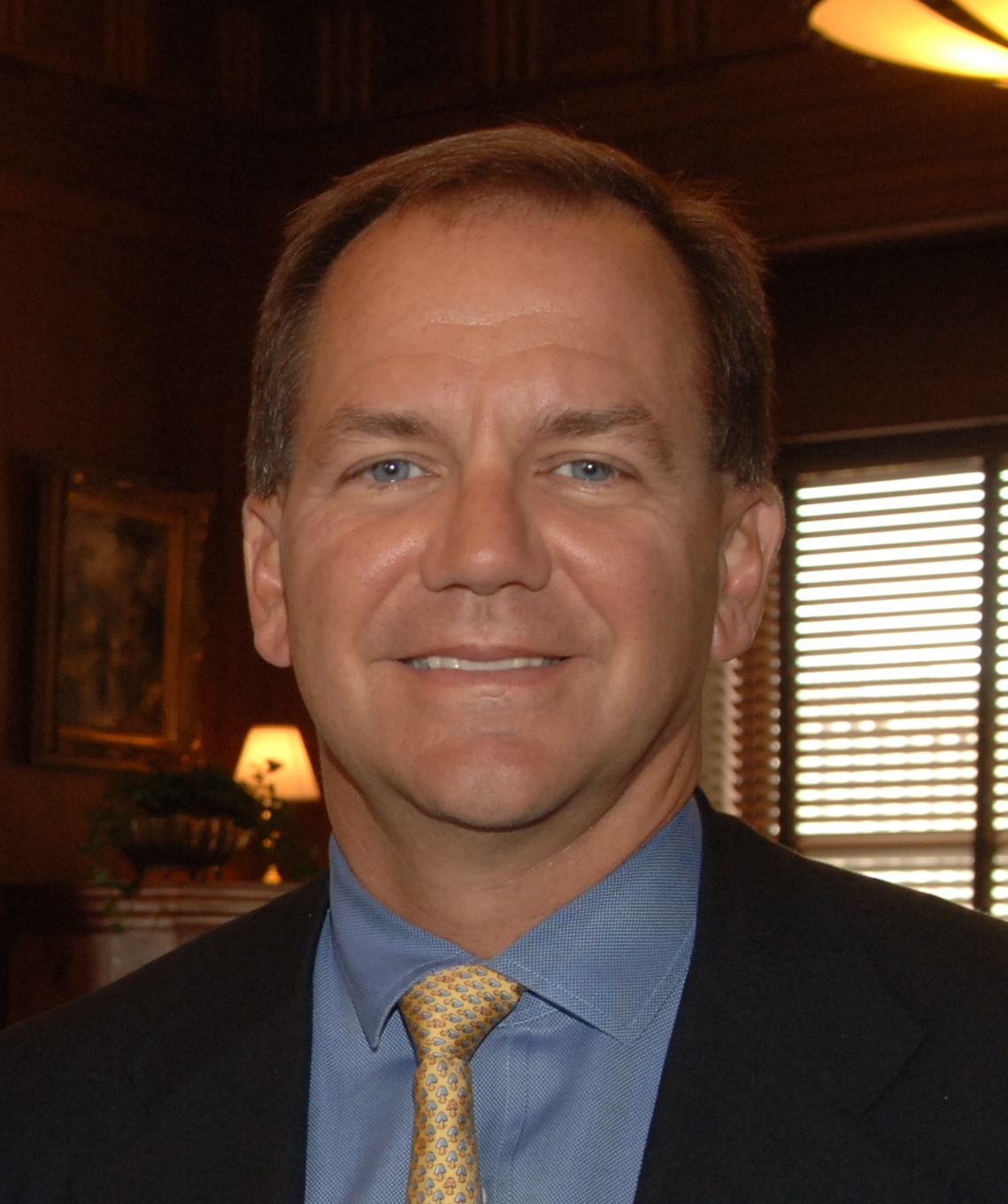
- Born: Paul Tudor Jones II; September 28, 1954 (age 72); Memphis, Tennessee, U.S.
- Education: University of Virginia (BA)
- Occupation: Hedge fund manager
- Years active: 1980–present
- Known for: Predicting Black Monday; Founding the Robin Hood Foundation
- Title: CEO, Tudor Investment Corporation
- Spouse: Sonia Klein (m. 1988)
- Children: 4

Paul Tudor Jones II (born September 28, 1954) is an American billionaire hedge fund manager. In 1980, he founded Tudor Investment Corporation, an asset management firm headquartered in Stamford, Connecticut. Eight years later, he co-founded the Robin Hood Foundation, which focuses on poverty reduction. As of 2026, his net worth was estimated at US$8.1 billion.

== Early life and education ==
Jones was born in Memphis, Tennessee. Paul Tudor Jones II's father John Paul "Jack" Jones practiced transportation law from an office located next door to The Daily News, a publication his family has owned and operated since 1886 and where Jack Jones was the publisher for 34 years. His half-brother is Peter Schutt.

Jones graduated from Presbyterian Day School, an all-boys elementary school, before attending Memphis University School for high school. Jones then went on to the University of Virginia where he was a welterweight boxing champion. While at the University of Virginia, Jones was president of the Sigma Alpha Epsilon fraternity. To pay for tuition, Jones wrote for his family's paper under the pseudonym Paul Eagle.

In 1976, he earned a bachelor's degree in economics from the University of Virginia. In the 1980s, Jones was accepted to Harvard Business School but did not attend.

== Career ==
=== 1976 New York Cotton Exchange ===
In 1976, after graduating from the University of Virginia Jones asked his cousin William Dunavant Jr. for an introduction to trading. Dunavant was the CEO of Dunavant Enterprises, one of the world's largest cotton merchants. Dunavant sent Jones to talk with commodity broker Eli Tullis in New Orleans. Tullis represented some of the largest cotton traders in the world. Tullis hired Jones and mentored him in trading cotton futures at the New York Cotton Exchange, but fired Jones when he fell asleep at his desk after a night of partying in New Orleans. Many years later, Jones served as treasurer in 1986 and then as chairman of the New York Cotton Exchange from August 1992 through June 1995.

=== 1976–1980 E. F. Hutton & Co. ===
At 24 years old, Jones became a commodities broker for E. F. Hutton & Co. While working at E.F. Hutton Jones worked with and became friends with Glenn Dubin.

=== 1980–present: Tudor Investment Corporation ===
Jones' firm manages $12 billion (as of 2022). Their investment capabilities are broad and diverse, including global macro trading, fundamental equity investing in the U.S. and Europe, emerging markets, venture capital, commodities, event-driven strategies, and technical trading systems.

The Tudor Group, consisting of Tudor Investment Corporation and its affiliates, is involved in active trading, investing, and research in assets across fixed income, currencies, equities, and commodities asset classes and related derivative and other instruments in the global markets for an international clientele. The investment strategies of the Tudor Group include, among others, discretionary global macro, quantitative global macro (managed futures), discretionary equity long/short, quantitative equity market neutral and growth equity.

Fees – Although the hedge fund industry standard is two percent per annum of assets under management and twenty percent of the profits, Tudor Investment Corp. charges four percent per annum of assets under management and twenty-three percent of the profits.

1980 founding – In 1980, Jones founded Tudor Investment Corporation, an asset management firm headquartered in Stamford, Connecticut. At the time, Jones was still a relatively unknown trader. Dunavant and Tullis were among Tudor's first clients. In one of Commodities Corporation's first external investments, Tudor was provided $30,000 to manage.

Tudor (i.e. Jones) used his experience in trading cotton to branch into other commodities and financial instruments such as stock-index contracts and currency futures.

1987 Black Monday – One of Jones' earliest and major successes was predicting Black Monday in 1987, tripling his money during the event due to large short positions.

In 1987, betting on a crash in the United States stock market Jones' Tudor' returned 125.9 percent after fees, earning an estimated $100 million.

Peter Borish, second-in-command to Jones at Tudor Investment Corporation, anticipated the crash in 1987 by mapping the 1987 market against the market preceding the 1929 crash.

1990s – Tudor achieved greater liquidity and thereby flexibility through Jones' chairmanship of the NYCE's Finex subsidiary. Jones, with his colleague Hunt Taylor, was instrumental in the creation of FINEX, the financial futures division of the New York Board of Trade, and in the development of their U.S. dollar index futures contract.

1990 – In 1990, as the Japanese equities bubble was bursting, Jones returned 87.4 percent through shorting the market.

1991 – Jones closed the Tudor Select Fund, a futures fund, and returned investor capital.

1994 SEC settlement – In 1994, Tudor paid a fine of $800,000 (the second highest at the time) to the SEC to settle allegations of violating (while not admitting or denying wrongdoing) the uptick rule, part of the Securities Exchange Act of 1934 that prohibits the sale of a borrowed stock while the stock is declining.

2000s – In 2014, the New York Times noted that returns for Tudor clients had "dimmed" over the decade following Jones' "deliberate move to trade more conservatively, fewer big interest-rate and currency moves as central banks kept short-term rates near zero and more competition as the hedge fund universe has mushroomed.

== Investments ==
=== 2012 – Castleton Commodities International ===
In October 2012, it was announced that Glenn Dubin, Paul Tudor Jones and Timothy Barakett were among a group of investors buying the merchant energy operation Louis Dreyfus Highbridge Energy ("LDH Energy") from Louis Dreyfus Company and Highbridge Capital Management, a New York-based hedge fund. The new company was named Castleton Commodities International, LLC.

=== Investment philosophy ===
Jones's global macro trading style is based primarily on technical analysis, as opposed to value investing, with an emphasis on momentum factors driving markets. In a 2000 interview, he suggested however that he regretted not being more involved with venture investing in technology firms during the 1990s. Jones also stated in 2020 that he owns bitcoin as a hedge against inflation.

== Wealth and philanthropy ==
As of 2026, Forbes estimated his net worth to be US$8.1 billion, making him the 481st richest person in the world.. In 2019, Tudor Jones and his wife had joined the Giving Pledge, vowing to give most of their wealth to charitable causes. Upon joining, they said, "we were both raised in the Church," and cited several Bible references supporting the decision.

== Conservation ==
In 1990, Jones pleaded guilty to illegally destroying 86 acres of protected wetlands on his Maryland Eastern Shore hunting estate with 1,400 cubic yards of gravel, without a permit. Jones was ordered to pay $1 million fine and $1 million in restitution to the National Fish and Wildlife Foundation and by pleading guilty avoided a possible one-year jail term for violating the Federal Clean Water Act.

In 1993, Jones co-founded the Everglades Foundation, which advocates for conservation of the Everglades, tropical wetlands in Florida. He chairs the organization's board, which includes Jimmy Buffett, Jack Nicklaus, David Lawrence Jr., Jon L. Mills, and William Wrigley Jr. II, among others.

In 2006, the New York Times described Jones as an "American conservationist" in reporting that in 2002, the Tanzanian government leased him the Grumeti reserve in Tanzania's western Serengeti. The Times explains the conservation reporting "The reserves are really three contiguous hunting blocks with Sasakwa at the center: Grumeti Game Reserve, Fort Ikoma Open Area and Ikorongo Game Reserve. Hunting blocks are supposed to generate income for the central government and local districts through the sale of hunting licenses and trophy fees. Grumeti Reserves would make no financial sense, as far as the government is concerned, if the hunting revenues from these blocks simply vanished. Jones’s solution has been to pay the hunting fees and nearly eliminate hunting."

In 2016 the National Audubon Society awarded Jones the Audubon Medal in recognition of his contributions to "conservation with economic sustainability and habitat protection."

== Philanthropy ==
In 1986, after watching an episode of CBS News' 60 Minutes about businessman and philanthropist Eugene Lang, Jones adopted a sixth-grade class in Bedford–Stuyvesant, Brooklyn at an underperforming public school. Jones guaranteed college scholarships to students that graduated from high school. His idea was this would be an incentive to students to engage in academics with his goal being that 90% of those students successfully complete high school. However, only 33% of the students in the class eventually graduated from high school. Jones believed he "vastly underestimated both the academic and social challenges facing [the students in the class he adopted]" and his program was "completely ill-equipped to [help them] in an efficient fashion." In his 2009 speech, Jones explained that this major failure on his part taught him lessons he's applied in subsequent education efforts.

In 2009, Jones delivered a commencement speech at the Buckley School about his experiences with failure and comebacks. He talked about failing to get 86 underserved students into college despite expense and effort later helped him start one of the most successful charter schools in New York.

In 2004, Jones founded the Excellence Charter School, the country's first all-boys charter school, located in the Bedford–Stuyvesant neighborhood of Brooklyn, New York.

He founded and chaired the Bedford Stuyvesant I Have A Dream Foundation, which puts local students in colleges.

=== University of Virginia giving ===
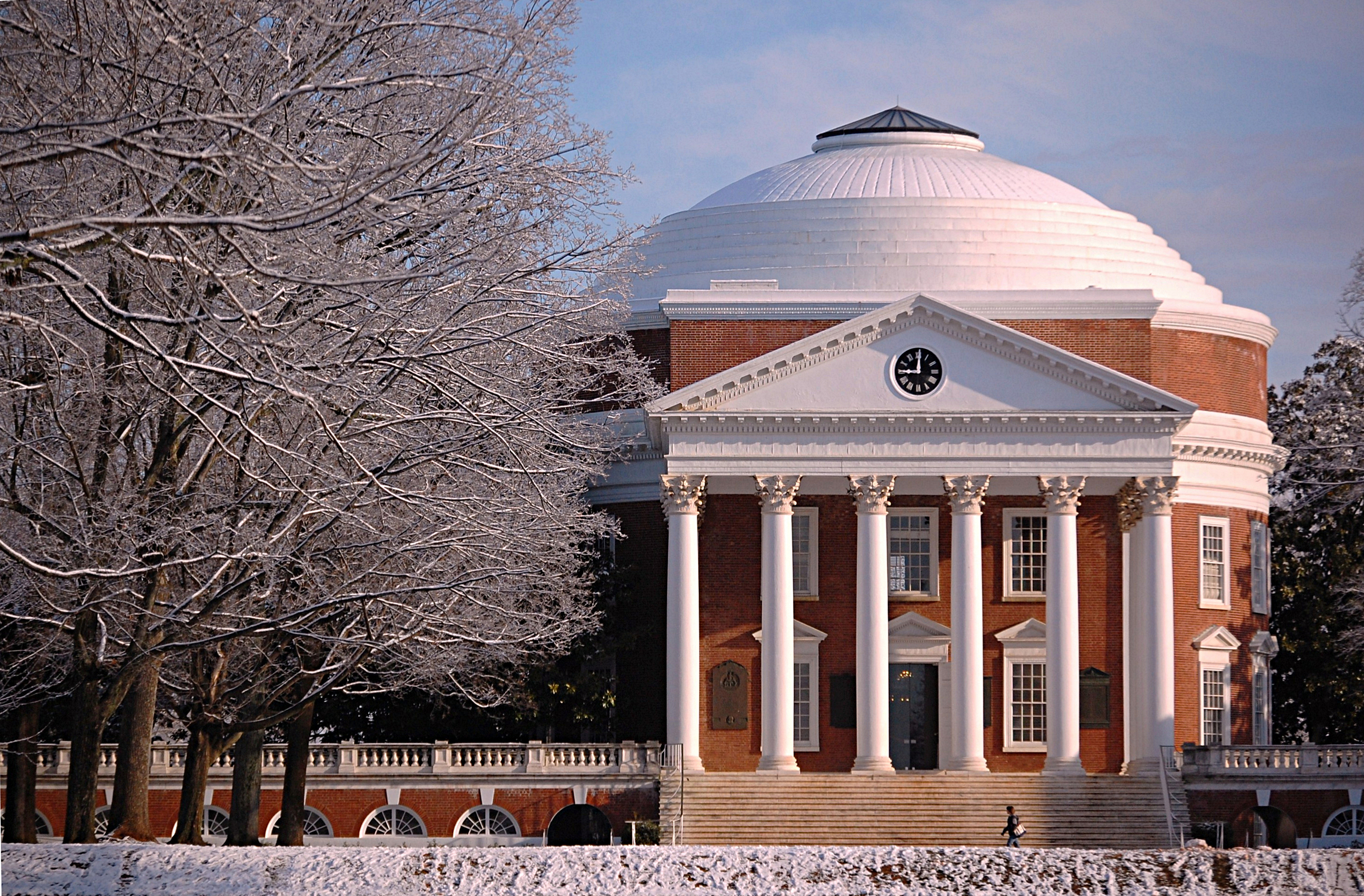
Tudor Jones gave $44 million to his alma mater, the University of Virginia, for a sports and concert arena which the university named after his father.

Jones has made large donations to his alma mater, the University of Virginia, including a $44 million donation, which went to the construction of a new basketball arena, named the John Paul Jones Arena, in honor of his father, an attorney who also attended the University of Virginia. In April 2012, UVA announced the creation of a new Contemplative Sciences Center through a $12 million gift from Jones and his wife, Sonia.

=== Robin Hood Foundation ===
Jones is the founder of the Robin Hood Foundation, a charitable organization backed mainly by hedge fund operators that attempts to alleviate problems caused by poverty in New York City. Other founding members include Peter Borish and Glenn Dubin.

=== Just Capital ===
He set up the nonprofit Just Capital to help Americans learn about companies that are considered "just". The organization uses data to discover which companies are most involved with the priorities Americans find most important. The nonprofit uses an annual, multi-phase survey to find out what these priorities are. Just Capital also operates a for profit ETF (exchange traded fund) comprising only companies believed to be "just".

== Politics and associations ==
A political independent, Jones has donated money to numerous Democratic and Republican candidates. In 2012 he donated $200,000 to Mitt Romney. During the 2008 presidential election, Jones hosted a 500-person fundraiser at his Greenwich home for then-candidate Barack Obama. Jones also donated to John McCain and Rudy Giuliani's presidential campaigns. Jones donated $50,000 to Kathy Hochul in 2023.

Jones previously served as a director of the Futures Industry Association and was instrumental in the creation and development of an education-arm for the association—the then Futures Industry Institute, a research institute later renamed the Institute for Financial Markets based in Washington D.C. Mr. Jones was also an advocate for the design and implementation of the first ethics training course that became the standard for exchange membership on all futures exchanges in the United States.

== Controversies ==
In June 2012, Jones was reportedly a key figure in the controversial ousting of University of Virginia President Teresa A. Sullivan. He penned an editorial supporting her resignation, citing the school's poor academic rankings, low salary for staff and other perceived problems. On June 26, 2012, the University of Virginia Board of Visitors unanimously voted to reinstate Sullivan.

In 2013, the Washington Post posted a video to their site showing Jones at an April 2013 closed-door investment roundtable at the University of Virginia responding to a question on the lack of diversity on the panel. Jones answered "saying that having a baby hurts the ability of women to focus on macro trading, where investors seek to profit from global equity, bond, currency and commodities markets." The soundbite from Jones' five minute answer that received attention was: "As soon as that baby's lips touched that girl's bosom, forget it". The Washington Post reported Jones' answer as meaning that: "female traders are just as capable as male traders, but he believes they lose their focus once they become mothers." Jones' comments quickly drew criticism from fellow traders, members of the media and others regarding mothers in his field of global macro trading. Jones apologized soon afterwards which did not cease the criticism he received. In a written statement sent to the Washington Post, Jones stated that "My off-the-cuff remarks at the University of Virginia were with regard to global macro traders, who are on-call 24/7 and of whom there are likely only a few thousand successful practitioners in the world today. Macro trading requires a high degree of skill, focus and repetition. Life events, such as birth, divorce, death of a loved one and other emotional highs and lows are obstacles to success in this specific field of finance."

Jones was a friend of film producer Harvey Weinstein and a member of the board of The Weinstein Company. In 2017, as Weinstein came under increasing pressure for sexual misconduct allegations, Jones wrote him an email encouraging him that the scrutiny would soon end, and advising him on how he could revive his reputation. Weinstein was convicted in 2020 and sentenced to 23 years for sexual assault. Jones distanced himself from Weinstein in a written statement, stating: "Harvey was a friend I believed too long and defended too long."

In the year before Jeffrey Epstein's death, Jones's hedge fund gave Epstein $13.5 million.

== Reputation ==
In 1987, PBS produced a documentary entitled Trader which focused on Jones's activities. The film shows Jones as a young man predicting the 1987 crash, using methods similar to those of market forecaster Robert Prechter. Although the video was shown on public television in November 1987, Jones requested in the 1990s that the documentary be removed from circulation. The video has surfaced from time to time on different video sharing and torrent sites, but has often been taken down shortly thereafter due to copyright claims. Various theories exist as to why Jones does not support the film. Despite the film's showing a positive approach to risk and client care, as well as showcasing Jones's charity work, it has been suggested that the film may reveal trading secrets.

A 1988 front-page story in The Wall Street Journal called him "the most-watched, most-talked-about man on Wall Street."

Having a low profile within financial media circles beginning in the late 1980s through to a report in 1997, Jones kept interviews with financial reporters to a minimum; while keeping a low profile in financial circles he was visible appearing on Larry King Live, promoting his Save Our Everglades campaign and the Robin Hood Foundation.

In 2019, Reuters has described Jones as "one of the giants" and reported that Jones is considered a legend among macro traders.

In 2008, he was inducted into Alpha magazine's Hedge Fund Manager Hall of Fame along with Alfred Jones, Bruce Kovner, David Swensen, George Soros, Jack Nash, James Simons, Julian Robertson, Kenneth Griffin, Leon Levy, Louis Bacon, Michael Steinhardt, Seth Klarman and Steven A. Cohen.

In 2019, he received the Golden Plate Award of the American Academy of Achievement, presented by Awards Council member Dr. Francis Collins, the director of the National Institutes of Health, during the International Achievement Summit in New York City.

== Personal life ==
By the mid-1980s, Jones as reported by Institutional Investor magazine was "developing a reputation for courting models and partying long into the night" and the Wall Street Journal ran a front-page article referring to Jones as Quotron Man in a profile covering his lifestyle. This was transpiring in 1987, as there was a general backlash against excesses on Wall Street. In 1988, Jones married Australian-born Sonia Klein, a New York-based yoga entrepreneur at a wedding in Memphis. In the early 1990s, Jones moved to Greenwich, Connecticut. They have three daughters and a son. His eldest daughter, Caroline, is a country-pop singer and musician and a member of the Zac Brown Band since 2022. Jones has encouraged his three daughters to go into macro trading. He resides in Palm Beach, Florida.

== See also ==
- List of University of Virginia people
