= Jonathan Hirtle =

American businessman

- Born: Jonathan Jacob Hirtle
- Education: BA, Pennsylvania State University (1974); MBA, Pennsylvania State University (1982)
- Years active: 38
- Known for: Outsourced Chief Investment Officer (OCIO) model
- Website: www.hirtle.com

Jonathan Jacob Hirtle is an investment industry executive who pioneered the outsourced Chief Investment Officer (OCIO) model. For his OCIO innovations, Hirtle has been dubbed the “Oracle of Outsource."

In 1988, Hirtle co-founded Hirtle & Co. (formerly Hirtle, Callaghan & Co.), recognized as the first OCIO firm to serve family groups and organizations that does not employ fully staffed investment departments. The firm has over $25 billion under management.

Jon serves as Executive Chairman of Hirtle & Co. He also serves on the Board of Directors of the Museum of the American Revolution and is active at the Buffalo Bill Center of the West in Cody, Wyoming.

== Background ==
Jonathan Hirtle was born in Cheswick, Pennsylvania in 1952 and graduated from Springdale High School in Springdale, PA.

Hirtle earned a BA in 1974 and an MBA in 1982 from Pennsylvania State University. From 1975 to 1982, Hirtle served as an officer in the United States Marine Corps.

Prior to founding Hirtle & Co. in 1988, Hirtle served as vice president at Goldman, Sachs & Co. for six years, advising family groups and institutions on investment strategy and securities selection.

Hirtle co-founded Hirtle & Co. to serve solely as an outsourced Chief Investment Officer and investment department to family groups and institutions that chose not to develop and pay for a full-staffed internal investment department.

== Hirtle & Co. ==
Hirtle & Co. designs and supervises comprehensive investment programs for families and institutions, and customizes its investment approach for each individual client.

The firm manages over $25 billion under prescribed direction split equally between family and institutional clients.

Hirtle serves as the firm's Executive Chairman and serves as an advisor to the firm's Management Committee, which directs and implements firmwide strategy and ensures effective management across all areas of the business.

=== Outsourced Chief Investment Officer Model ===
At Hirtle & Co., Jonathan Hirtle pioneered the now-popular outsourced Chief Investment Officer (OCIO) model.
