= John Sykes (entertainment industry executive) =

American entertainment executive (born 1955)

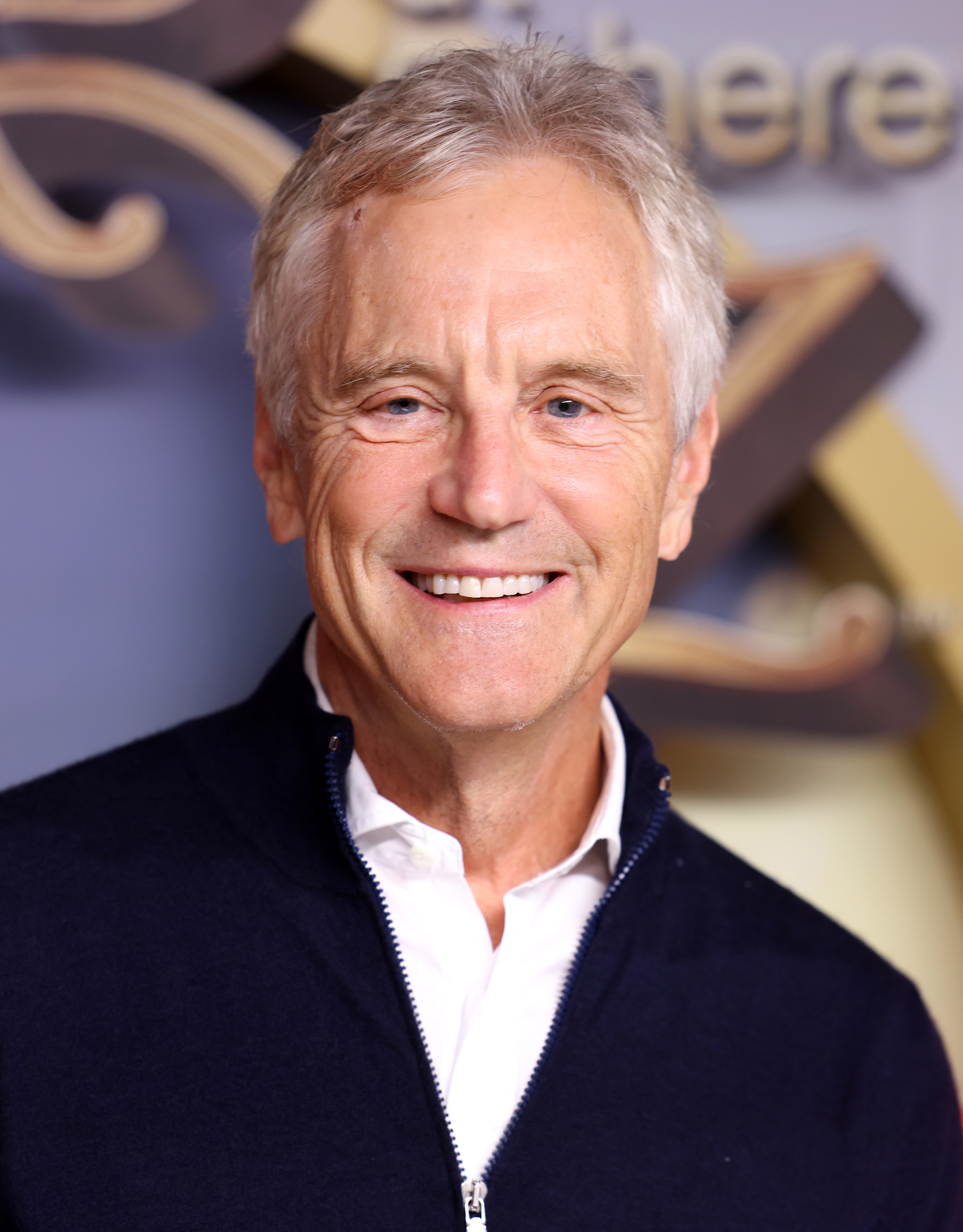
- Sykes in 2025
- Born: May 14, 1955 (age 71); Schenectady, NY, US
- Education: Syracuse University
- Occupation: Entertainment industry executive
- Years active: 1980 - present
- Title: President, entertainment enterprises, iHeartMedia; Chairman, Rock and Roll Hall of Fame Foundation

John Sykes (born May 14, 1955) is an American entertainment industry executive. He is the president of entertainment enterprises at iHeartMedia and the chairman of the Rock and Roll Hall of Fame Foundation. A co-founder of MTV, Sykes was previously president, VH1; president, Chrysalis Records, North America; and chairman and CEO, Infinity Broadcasting Corporation.

== Early life and education ==
Sykes was raised in Schenectady, New York, the son of a retail executive and a college professor. He attended Syracuse University, where his college roommates were Phil Quartararo and talent agent Rob Light. He received a BS in communications from the S.I. Newhouse School of Public Communications in 1977, and upon graduation, was hired by Columbia Records.

== Career ==
=== MTV ===
John Sykes began his career in media in October 1980 when he was hired by Warner-Amex Satellite Entertainment Company (WASEC) as part of a development team that created the first-ever 24/7 cable music channel—MTV: Music Television.

In August 1981, WASEC's cable music channel was launched under the name MTV: Music Television. Sykes' first position was Director of Promotion and Artist Relations, in which he was responsible for creating MTV's well-known, larger-than-life fantasy on-air promotions, including MTV's "One Night Stand" with bands like the Rolling Stones and Journey, John Mellencamp's "Pink House" giveaway and MTV's "Lost Weekend with Van Halen." These promotions helped to create and shape the MTV brand image, drawing millions of entries. Sykes also worked closely with artists, managers and record labels to bring content and partnerships to the video channel.

While at MTV, Sykes helped to create and co-executive produced the first-ever MTV Video Music Awards (VMAs). He also held the role of Vice President, Programming and Productions, overseeing all studio operations, on-air promotion and long-form content on the network.

In 1986 Sykes, Robert W. Pittman, Tom Freston and a group of MTV executives, and with the help from private equity firm Forstmann Little & Company, attempted a leveraged buyout of MTV Networks (now Viacom Media Networks). Before the buyout could be completed, MTV was sold to Viacom.

=== Music industry ===
In July 1986, Sykes left MTV and became a music and film talent agent at Creative Artists Agency (CAA). While at the agency, he worked on new artist signings including John Mellencamp and Michael Jackson.

In August 1988, Sykes left CAA to become President of Champion Entertainment, a music management entertainment company based in New York City that represented top entertainment artists, including Mariah Carey, John Mellencamp, Hall & Oates, and Carly Simon.

In January 1990, he joined Chrysalis Records as President, North America where he oversaw artist and repertoire, marketing and artist development. In January 1992 Chrysalis Records was sold to EMI Music and Sykes joined EMI Publishing as the Executive Vice President of Artist Acquisitions. While at EMI, he signed the band Counting Crows, whose debut album sold 7 million copies. He also signed rock band Stone Temple Pilots, whose debut album also sold 7 million copies in America. At EMI Sykes developed the first in-house artist strategic marketing department to work hand-in-hand with record companies to develop artists’ careers.

=== VH1 ===
In April 1994 Sykes returned to MTV Networks/Viacom as President of the VH1 Cable Television Network. During his eight-year term as head of the network, he rebranded VH1 as a music and pop culture channel targeted to affluent 20+ demographics, repositioning the channel as VH1: Music First and created long-form franchises such as VH1's Behind the Music, VH1 Storytellers, and Pop-Up Video, as well as events including the VH1/Vogue Fashion Awards and VH1 Honors. Sykes led the cable network to record audience ratings, revenues and profits for all eight years. While at VH1 Sykes created the VH1 Save The Music Foundation, a non-profit organization dedicated to rebuilding music education programs in public schools across the country. VH1 Save The Music drew the support of President Bill Clinton, himself a student of music, and then-First Lady Hillary Clinton, who visited schools in support of the initiative and hosted VH1's 1999 "Concert of the Century" on the South Lawn at the White House. To date, VH1 Save The Music has donated more than $50 million worth of music instruments to schools across the nation.

=== Viacom ===
In 2002 Sykes was named by Viacom as chairman and CEO of Infinity Broadcasting Corporation (now CBS Radio) where he oversaw the company's 185 broadcast radio stations. In January 2005 Sykes returned to MTV Networks as president of network development.

=== Pilot Group ===
In March 2008 Sykes left Viacom to join his MTV co-founder Robert W. Pittman at Pilot Group, a private equity venture firm. While at Pilot he worked with Anchorage Advisors on the restructuring of MGM Studios from bankruptcy and with digital properties including Shazam. In 2010, he joined the Shazam Board of Directors and also began consulting for Clear Channel Media Holdings.

=== iHeartMedia ===
Sykes is President of iHeartMedia Entertainment Enterprises, where he is responsible for managing iHeart content partnerships across a broad range of media including television, podcasting, digital platforms and live events. In addition, he creates value for iHeartMedia advertisers and key partners. Sykes also guides the company's relationship with the music industry, as well as overseeing the creation and distribution of iHeart branded video content and marquee events with broadcast and streaming partners.

Sykes co-executive produces iHeartMedia's live music and television events including the iHeartRadio Music Awards aired on FOX, the annual iHeartRadio Music Festival aired on The CW Television Network, the iHeartRadio Jingle Ball Tour aired on The CW Television Network, the iHeartCountry Festival, iHeartRadio Wango Tango, the iHeartRadio Fiesta Latina, the iHeartRadio Podcast Awards, and iHeartRadio ALTer Ego. The 2019 iHeartRadio Music Awards garnered more than 310 billion social media impressions.

== Philanthropy ==
Sykes has been actively involved with fighting poverty in New York City through his work as a board member of the Robin Hood Foundation since 1995, an organization that has raised over $3 billion to help the poor living in New York. In 1997, while President of VH1, he created the VH1 Save the Music Foundation, which has raised over $50 million to rebuild music education programs in public schools across America. Sykes has been recognized with numerous honors including a Primetime Emmy Award and two George Foster Peabody Awards.

In October 2001, following the attacks on the World Trade Center Sykes co-executive produced the Concert for New York City (the historic 9/11 benefit) at Madison Square Garden. The concert raised over $50 million for the Robin Hood Relief Fund which provided funds and support for the families of the victims of the 9/11 attacks in New York City. In December 2012 Sykes co-executive produced the special one-night-only concert event, 12-12-12: The Concert for Sandy Relief. 12-12-12 raised over $60 million to provide assistance to the millions of people throughout the tri-state area who were affected by Hurricane Sandy through the Robin Hood Relief Fund. The concert featured performances from legendary artists including Bruce Springsteen & The E Street Band, the Rolling Stones, Eric Clapton, Billy Joel, Alicia Keys Chris Martin, Bon Jovi, Eddie Vedder, Roger Waters, Kanye West, the Who and Paul McCartney.

In March 2020 following the initial outbreak of the COVID-19 virus, Sykes co-executive produced, along with Tom Poleman and Joel Gallen, “FOX Presents: The iHeart Living Room Concert for America,” hosted by Sir Elton John, which raised $15m for charities, Feeding America and The First Responders Children's Foundation.

In May 2020, when New York City was adversely impacted by the COVID-19 pandemic, Sykes executive produced, along with Alex Coletti, "Rise Up New York!," a virtual telethon event, that aired on all New York network television and radio affiliates, raising $125 million in one evening to help those most impacted. The event was hosted by Tina Fey and featured appearances and performances by Gov. Andrew Cuomo, Robert De Niro, the New York Giants, Mariah Carey, Billy Joel, Alicia Keys, Bette Midler, Lin-Manuel Miranda, Sting, Barbra Streisand and others.

=== Board positions ===
John Sykes serves as the Chairman of the Board of the Rock and Roll Hall of Fame Foundation. He also serves on the board of directors of Madison Square Garden Entertainment, MSG Networks, Syracuse University's S.I. Newhouse School of Public Communications, and Product (RED), an organization founded by Bono and Bobby Shriver to fight HIV/AIDS in Africa.

== Awards and recognition ==
Sykes was presented with an Honorary Doctorate degree and gave the commencement address at the Berklee College of Music in 2000. He received the City of Hope's Spirit of Life Award in 1996, the Cable Television Public Affairs Association's President's Award in 2002, The Academy of Television Arts and Sciences’ Primetime Emmy Governors Award in 2000, the National Music Council’s American Eagle Award in 1998, and the 1999 Bill of Rights Award from the American Civil Liberties Union of Southern California. In addition, in 2014 Sykes was awarded the T.J. Martell Foundation Lifetime Music Industry Achievement Award which was presented to him by longtime friend President Bill Clinton. In 2019 he was inducted into the Cable Hall of Fame.
