= Salient Partners =

- Type: Private
- Industry: Private equity
- Founded: 2002
- Defunct: November 2022
- Fate: Acquired by Westwood Holdings Group
- Headquarters: Houston, United States
- Key people: John A. Blaisdell (CEO); Jeremy L. Radcliffe (President); W. Ben Hunt (Chief Investment Strategist)
- Products: Venture capital Emerging markets Risk parity
- Total assets: $14 billion (2017)
- Website: www.salientpartners.com

Salient Partners was a private equity firm based in Houston, Texas, with offices in New York City, San Francisco and Newport Beach. The firm's strategies included emerging markets, real estate investment trusts (REITs), master limited partnership (MLPs) investments, managed futures, risk parity funds, and liquid alternative investments. The firm was acquired by Westwood Holdings Group in 2022.

== History ==
Salient Partners was founded in 2002 by Andrew Linbeck, Haag Sherman, Jeremy Radcliffe and John Blaisdell. In 2003, the Sanders Morris Harris Group (SMHG) secured a 50% stake in the firm, and Salient combined its assets with SMHG's Pinnacle Management & Trust Co. SMHG sold its ownership interests back to Salient in 2008. In 2015, Salient was the third largest Houston-area money management firm ranked by local assets under management at $21.5 billion. That same year, the firm completed its acquisition of Forward Management LLC, reporting a resulting $27.6 billion in combined assets.

In 2012, the firm launched the Salient Risk Parity Index, purportedly the first of its kind for the industry.

In February 2020, J. Philip Ferguson took over as interim CEO following the unexpected death of founder and long-term CEO John Blaisdell. Later that year the board appointed Bill Enszer as CEO. Prior to becoming CEO, Enszer was a managing director with the firm for over 10 years.

Salient Partners was acquired by Westwood Holdings, an investment and wealth management firm based in Dallas in November 2022.

== Media ==
Dr. W. Ben Hunt, Salient Partners' Chief Investment Strategist has served as the primary author for the Salient blog and newsletter, Epsilon Theory. The site analyzes market trends through the lens of game theory.
