= Price action trading =

Trading

Price action trading is about reading what the market is doing, so you can deploy the right trading strategy to reap the maximum benefits. In simple words, price action is a trading technique in which a trader reads the market and makes subjective trading decisions based on the price movements, rather than relying on technical indicators or other factors.

At its most simplistic, it attempts to describe the human thought processes invoked by experienced, non-disciplinary traders as they observe and trade their markets. Price action is simply how prices change - the action of price. It is most noticeable in markets with high liquidity and price volatility, but anything that is traded freely (in price) in a market will per se demonstrate price action.

Price action trading can be considered a part of the technical analysis, but it is highly complex compared to most forms of technical analysis, and it incorporates the behavioural analysis of market participants as a crowd from evidence displayed in price action - a type of analysis whose academic coverage isn't focused in any one area, rather is widely described and commented on in the literature on trading, speculation, gambling and competition generally, and therefore, requires a separate article. It includes a large part of the methodology employed by floor traders and tape readers. It can also optionally include analysis of volume and level 2 quotes.

A price action trader typically observes the relative size, shape, position, growth (when watching the current real-time price) and volume (optionally) of bars on an OHLC bar or candlestick chart (although simple line charts also work), starting as simple as a single bar, most often combined with chart formations found in broader technical analysis such as moving averages, trend lines and trading ranges. The use of price action analysis for financial speculation doesn't exclude the simultaneous use of other techniques of analysis, although many minimalist price action traders choose to rely completely on the behavioural interpretation of price action to build a trading strategy.

Various authors who write about price action, e.g. Brooks, Duddella, assign names to many common price action chart bar formations and behavioral patterns they observe, which introduces a discrepancy in naming of similar chart formations between many authors, or definition of two different formations of the same name. Some patterns can often only be described subjectively, and a textbook pattern formation may occur in reality with great variations.

== Credibility ==
There is no evidence that these explanations are correct even if the price action trader who makes such statements is profitable and appears to be correct. Since the disappearance of most pit-based financial exchanges, the financial markets have become anonymous, buyers do not meet sellers, and so the feasibility of verifying any proposed explanation for the other market participants' actions during the occurrence of a particular price action pattern is exceedingly small. Also, price action analysis can be subject to survivorship bias for failed traders do not gain visibility. Hence, for these reasons, the explanations should only be viewed as subjective rationalisations and may quite possibly be wrong, but at any point in time they offer the only available logical analysis with which the price action trader can work.

The implementation of price action analysis is difficult, requiring the gaining of experience under live market conditions and prior knowledge of "market states." There is every reason to assume that the percentage of price action speculators who fail, give up or lose their trading capital will be similar to the percentage failure rate across all fields of speculation. It is commonly thought to be 90%, although analysis of data from US forex brokers' regulatory disclosures since 2010 puts the figure for failed accounts at around 75% and suggests this is typical.

Some skeptical authors dismiss the financial success of individuals using technical analysis such as price action and state that the occurrence of individuals who appear to be able to profit in the markets can be attributed solely to the Survivorship bias.

== Analytical process ==
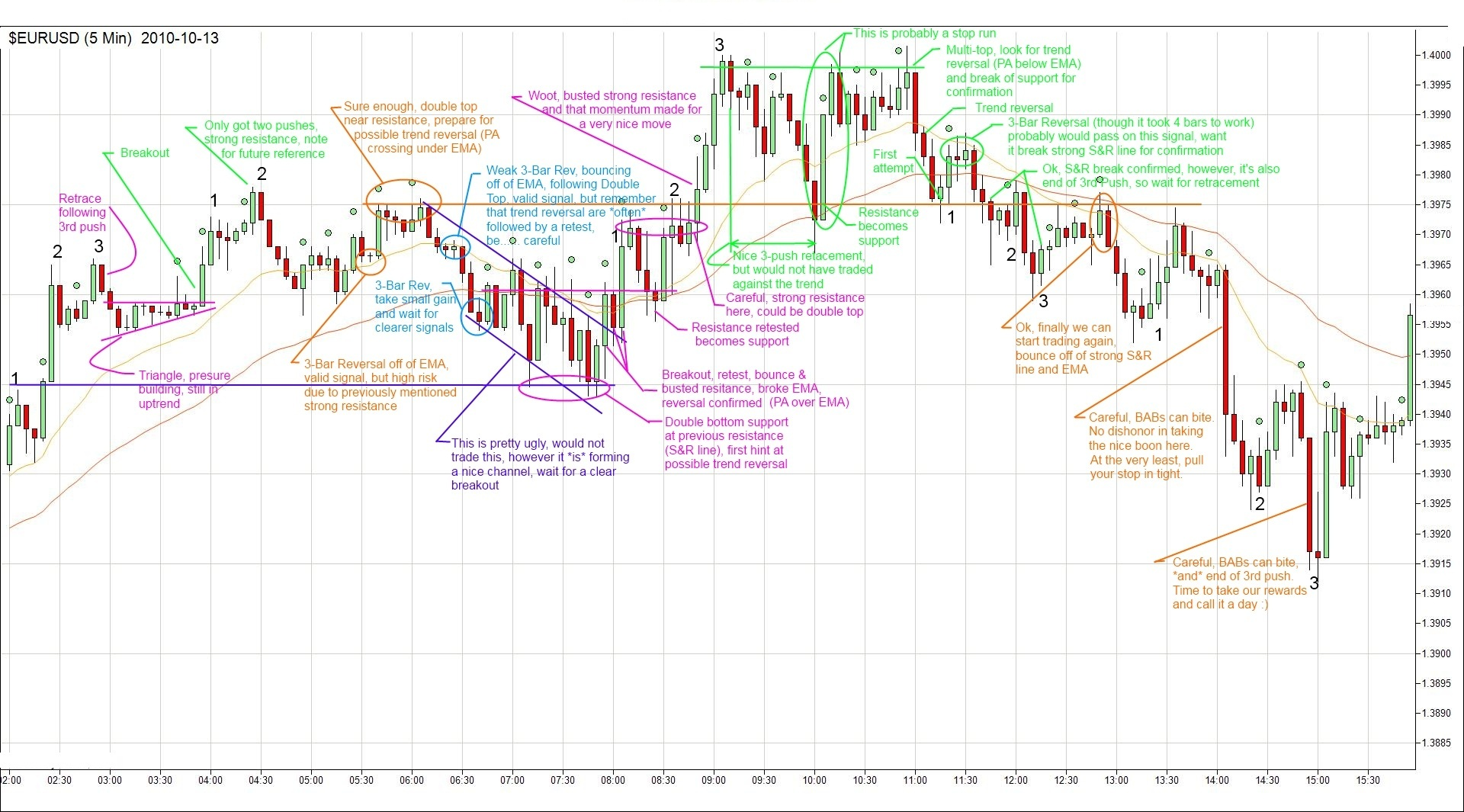
A candlestick chart of the Euro against the USD, marked up by a price action trader.

A price action trader's analysis may start with classical price action technical analysis, e.g. Edwards and Magee patterns including trend lines, break-outs and pullbacks, which are broken down further and supplemented with extra bar-by-bar analysis, sometimes including volume. This observed price action gives the trader clues about the current and likely future behaviour of other market participants. The trader can explain why a particular pattern is predictive, in terms of bulls (buyers in the market), bears (sellers), the crowd mentality of other traders, change in volume and other factors. A good knowledge of the market's make-up is required.

Price action patterns occur with every bar and the trader watches for multiple patterns to coincide or occur in a particular order, creating a set-up that results in a signal to enter or exit. Individual traders can have widely varying preferences for the type of setup that they concentrate on in their trading.

== Implementation of trades ==
The price action trader will use setups to determine entries and exits for positions. Each setup has its optimal entry point. Some traders also use price action signals to exit, simply entering at one setup and then exiting the whole position on the appearance of a negative setup. Alternatively, the trader might simply exit instead at a profit target of a specific cash amount or at a predetermined level of loss. This style of exit is often based on the previous support and resistance levels of the chart. A more experienced trader will have their own well-defined entry and exit criteria, built from experience.

An experienced price action trader are adept at spotting multiple bars, patterns, formations and setups during real-time market observation. However, a chart can be interpreted in multiple different ways, which may lead to discrepancy of interpretations between two traders, despite using the same method of analysis.

Most price action authors state that a simple setup on its own is rarely enough to signal a trade. There should be strength in the direction of the trade that a trader is thinking of taking and at least two reasons to enter the trade. When the trader finds that the price action signals are strong enough, the trader tends to continue to wait for the appropriate entry point or exit point.

During real-time trading, signals can be observed frequently while the bar is forming, and they are not considered ultimate until the bar closes at the end of the chart's time frame. An entrance of a trade based on signals that have not been finalized is known as an early entrance and is considered to be risky since there is a possibility that the market may move in the adverse direction, and when the bar has formed, the ultimate signal does not agree with the trade direction.

== Behavioural observation ==
A price action trader generally sets great store in human fallibility and the tendency for traders in the market to behave as a crowd. For instance, a trader who is bullish about a certain stock might observe that this stock is moving in a range from $20 to $30, but that trader expects the stock to rise to at least $50. Many other traders would simply buy the stock, but then every time that it fell to the low of its trading range, would become disheartened and lose faith in their prediction and sell. A price action trader would wait until the stock hit $31.

The above example is one by Livermore from the 1940s. In a modern-day market, the price action trader would first be alerted to the stock once the price has broken out to $31, but knowing the counter-intuitiveness of the market and having picked up other signals from the price action, would expect the stock to pull-back from there and would only buy when the pull-back finished and the stock moved up again.

Support, Resistance, and Fibonacci levels are all important areas where human behavior may affect price action. Brooks claim that these levels, along with other price history levels (such as swing highs and lows, gap high or low, the 20-bar exponential moving average value), serve as magnets that attract the price.

"Psychological levels", such as levels ending in .00, are a very common order trigger location. Several strategies use these levels as a means to plot out where to secure profit or place a Stop Loss. These levels are purely the result of human behavior as they interpret said levels to be important. However, in recent years, most trading volume is generated by computers, and psychological levels have become less reliable.

== Two attempts rule ==
An observation of many price action traders and authors is that the market often revisits price levels where it reversed or consolidated. If the market reverses at a certain level, then on returning to that level, which is referred to as a magnet, the trader expects the market to either carry on past the reversal point or to reverse again. The trader takes no action until the market has done one or the other. Many traders only consider price movements when trading diverges or trend changes. Most traders will not trade unless there is a signal to show high probability of a reversal, because they want to see the close of a major reversal, but this is very rare. The objective of this technique is to gain a probabilistic edge that should let the trader earn in the long run.

It is considered to bring higher probability trade entries, once this point has passed and the market is either continuing or reversing again. The traders do not take the first opportunity but rather wait for a second entry to make their trade. For instance the second attempt by bears to force the market down to new lows represents, if it fails, a double bottom and the point at which many bears will abandon their bearish opinions and start buying, joining the bulls and generating a strong move upwards.

Also as an example, after a break-out of a trading range or a trend line, the market may return to the level of the break-out and then instead of rejoining the trading range or the trend, will reverse and continue the break-out. This is also known as 'confirmation'.

== Trapped ==
"Trapped traders" is a common price action term referring to traders who have entered the market on weak signals, or before signals were triggered, or without waiting for confirmation and who find themselves in losing positions because the market turns against them. Any price action pattern that the traders used for a signal to enter the market is considered 'failed' and that failure becomes a signal in itself to price action traders, e.g. failed breakout, failed trend line break, failed reversal. It is assumed that the trapped traders will be forced to exit the market and if in sufficient numbers, this will cause the market to accelerate away from them, thus providing an opportunity for the more patient traders to benefit from their duress. "Trapped traders" is therefore used to describe traders in a position that will be stopped out if price action hits their stop loss limit. The term is closely linked to the idea of a "trap" which Brooks defines as "an entry that immediately reverses to the opposite direction before a scalper’s profit target is reached, trapping traders in their new position, ultimately forcing them to cover at a loss. It can also scare traders out of a good trade."

Since many traders place protective stop orders to exit from positions that go wrong, all the stop orders placed by trapped traders will provide the orders that boost the market in the direction that the more patient traders bet on. The phrase "the stops were run" refers to the execution of these stop orders. Since 2009, the use of the term "trapped traders" has grown in popularity and is now a generic term used by price actions traders and applied in different markets – stocks, futures, forex, commodities, cryptocurrencies, etc. All trapped trader strategies are essentially variations of Brooks pioneering work.

== Trend and range definition ==
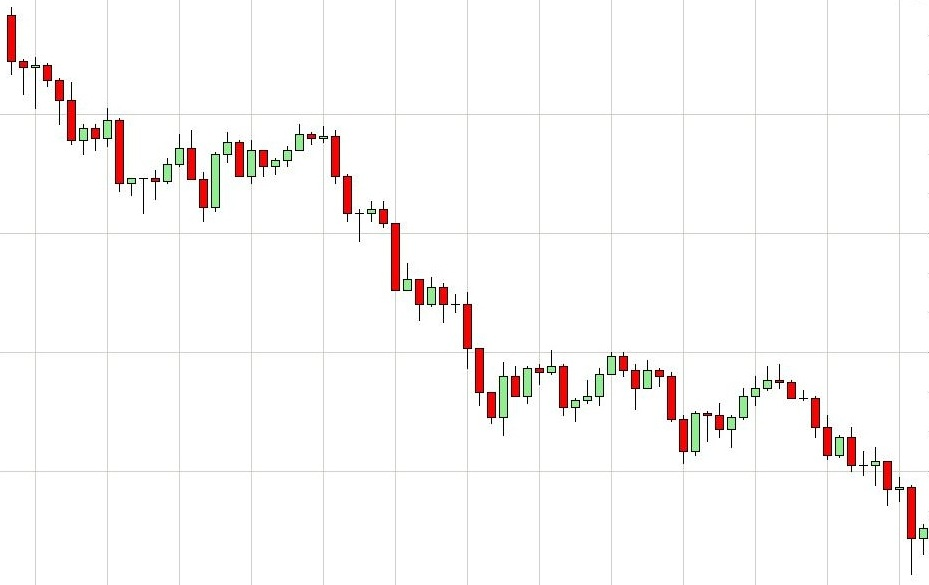
A 'bear' trend where the market is continually falling, having only weak pullbacks.

The concept of a trend is one of the primary concepts in technical analysis. A trend is either up or down and for the complete neophyte observing a market, an upwards trend can be described simply as a period of time over which the price has moved up. An upwards trend is also known as a bull trend, or a rally. A bear trend or downwards trend or sell-off (or crash) is where the market moves downwards. The definition is as simple as the analysis is varied and complex. The assumption is of serial correlation, i.e. once in a trend, the market is likely to continue in that direction.

On any chart, the price action trader tend to check to see whether the market is trending up or down, or confined to a trading range first.

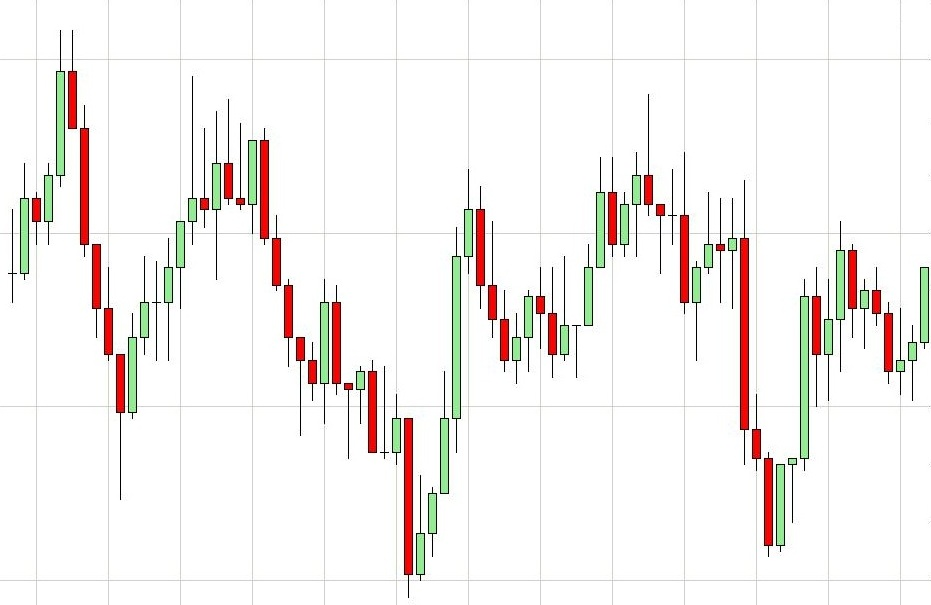
A trading range where the market turns around at the ceiling and the floor to stay within an explicit price band.

The market is described to be in a range when there is no discernible trend. It is defined by its floor and its ceiling, but this perception is always subject to debate. A range can also be referred to as a horizontal channel.

== OHLC bar or candlestick structure ==
A candlestick or OHLC bar consists of:

- Open: the price of the first trade of the bar
- Close: the price of the last trade of the bar
- High: the highest trade price of the bar
- Low: the lowest trade price of the bar
- Body: the part of the bar between the open and the close
- Tail (upper or lower): the parts of the bar not between the open and the close

== Range bar ==
A range bar is a bar with virtually no body, i.e. the open and the close are at virtually the same price and therefore there has been no net change over the time period. This is also known in Japanese Candlestick terminology as a Doji. Japanese Candlesticks show demand with more precision and only a Doji is a Doji, whereas a price action trader might consider a bar with a small body to be a range bar. It is termed 'range bar' because the price during the period of the bar moved between a floor (the low) and a ceiling (the high) and ended more or less where it began. If the trader looks at the chart at a lower time frame and check the price movement during that bar, it would appear similar to a range.

== Trend bar ==
There are bull and bear trend bars - bars with bodies - where the bar has ended with a net change from the beginning of the bar. Bull trend bars are trend bars where the close is higher than the open (although some define bull trend bars as trend bars where the close is higher than the previous close), whereas bear trend bars are the opposite.

Trend bars are often referred to for short as bull bars or bear bars.

=== With-trend bar ===
A trend bar with movement in the same direction as the chart's trend is known as 'with trend', i.e. a bull trend bar in a bull market is a "with trend bull" bar. In a downwards market, a bear trend bar is a "with trend bear" bar.

=== Counter-trend bar ===
A trend bar in the opposite direction to the prevailing trend is a "counter-trend" bull or bear bar.

=== Climactic exhaustion bar ===
This is a with-trend trend bar with a with-trend gap whose unusually large body signals that in a trend the last traders of a certain direction have entered the market, and therefore, if opposite traders (i.e. counter-trend) prevail, the market will reverse.

=== Shaved bar ===
A shaved bar is a trend bar that is all body and has no tails. A partially shaved bar has a shaved top (no upper tail) or a shaved bottom (no lower tail).

== Inside bar ==
An "inside bar" is a bar which is smaller and within the high to low range of the prior bar, i.e. the high is lower than (or equal to) the previous bar's high, and the low is higher than (or equal to) the previous bar's low. Its relative position can be at the top, the middle or the bottom of the prior bar.

In the case both the highs and the lows are the same, because markets are often imperfect, the bars may still be considered inside bars, despite the second bar not appearing to stay inside the first bar.

== Outside bar ==
An outside bar is larger than the prior bar and totally overlaps it. Its high is higher than (or equal to) the previous high, and its low is lower than (or equal to) the previous low.

The context in which they appear is the most important in their interpretation.

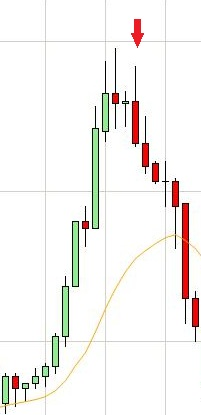
The outside bar after the maximum price (marked with an arrow) is a failure to restart the trend and a signal for a sizable retrace.

Most price action traders will ignore outside bars, especially in the middle of trading ranges, wherein they are considered meaningless.

When an outside bar appears in a retrace of a strong trend, rather than acting as a range bar, it does show strong trending tendencies. For instance, a bear outside bar in the retrace of a bull trend is a good signal that the retrace will continue further. This is explained by the way the outside bar forms, since it begins forming in real time as a potential bull bar that is extending above the previous bar, which would encourage many traders to enter a bullish trade to profit from a continuation of the old bull trend. When the market reverses and the potential for a bull bar disappears, it leaves the bullish traders trapped.

If the price action traders have other reasons to be bearish in addition to this action, they will wait for that to occur and will take the opportunity to make money going short where the trapped bulls have their protective stops positioned. If the reversal in the outside bar was quick, then many bearish traders will be as surprised as the bulls and the result will provide extra impetus to the market as they all seek to sell after the outside bar has closed. The same sort of situation also holds true in reverse for retracements of bear trends.

== Small bar ==
As with all price action formations, small bars must be viewed in context. A quiet trading period, e.g. on a US holiday, may have many small bars appearing that require traders to look on a higher time frame to discern the pattern. In general, small bars are a display of the lack of enthusiasm from either side of the market. A small bar can also just represent a pause in buying or selling activity as either side waits to see if the opposing market forces come back into play. Alternatively small bars may represent a lack of conviction on the part of those driving the market in one direction, therefore signalling a reversal. However, small series of trending bars in the direction of the predominant trend is a sign of strength, as, in the case of a bull trend, buyers are continuing to accumulate a certain security.

As such, small bars can be interpreted to mean opposite things to opposing traders, but small bars are taken less as signals on their own, rather as a part of a larger setup involving any number of other price action observations. For instance in some situations a small bar can be interpreted as a pause, an opportunity to enter with the market direction, and in other situations a pause can be seen as a sign of weakness and so a clue that a reversal is likely.

One instance where small bars are taken as signals is in a trend where they appear in a pull-back. They signal the end of the pull-back and hence an opportunity to enter a trade with the trend.

== ii and iii patterns ==
An 'ii' is a pattern of 2 consecutive inside bars, while the 'iii' variant consists of 3 inside bars. Most often these are small or mid-sized bars.

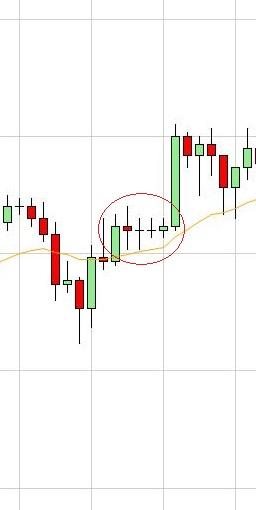
An iii formation - 3 consecutive inside bars.

Price action traders who are unsure of market direction but sure of further movement - an opinion gleaned from other price action - would place an entry to buy above an ii or an iii and simultaneously an entry to sell below it, and would look for the market to break out of the price range of the pattern. Whichever order is executed, the other order then becomes the protective stop order that would get the trader out of the trade with a small loss if the market doesn't act as predicted.

A typical setup using the ii pattern is outlined by Brooks. An ii after a sustained trend that has suffered a trend line break is likely to signal a strong reversal if the market breaks out against the trend. The small inside bars are attributed to the buying and the selling pressure reaching an equilibrium. The entry stop order would be placed one tick on the counter-trend side of the first bar of the ii and the protective stop would be placed one tick beyond the first bar on the opposite side.

== Trend ==
Classically a trend is defined visually by plotting a trend line on the opposite side of the market from the trend's direction, or by a pair of trend channel lines - a trend line plus a parallel return line on the other side - on the chart. These sloping lines reflect the direction of the trend and connect the highest highs or the lowest lows of the trend. In its idealised form, a trend will consist of trending higher highs or lower lows and in a rally, the higher highs alternate with higher lows as the market moves up, and in a sell-off the sequence of lower highs (forming the trendline) alternating with lower lows forms as the market falls. A swing in a rally is a period of gain ending at a higher high (aka swing high), followed by a pull-back ending at a higher low (higher than the start of the swing). The opposite applies in sell-offs, each swing having a swing low at the lowest point.

When the market breaks the trend line, the trend from the end of the last swing until the break is known as an 'intermediate trend line' or a 'leg'. A leg up in a trend is followed by a leg down, which completes a swing. Frequently price action traders will look for two or three swings in a standard trend.

With-trend legs contain 'pushes', a large with-trend bar or series of large with-trend bars. A trend need not have any pushes but it is usual.

A trend is established once the market has formed three or four consecutive legs, e.g. for a bull trend, higher highs and higher lows. The higher highs, higher lows, lower highs and lower lows can only be identified after the next bar has closed. Identifying it before the close of the bar risks that the market will act contrary to expectations, move beyond the price of the potential higher/lower bar and leave the trader aware only that the supposed turning point was an illusion.

A more risk-seeking trader would view the trend as established even after only one swing high or swing low.

At the start of what a trader is hoping is a bull trend, after the first higher low, a trend line can be drawn from the low at the start of the trend to the higher low and then extended. When the market moves across this trend line, it has generated a trend line break for the trader, who is given several considerations from this point on. If the market moved with a particular rhythm to-and-from the trend line with regularity, the trader will give the trend line added weight. Any significant trend line that sees a significant trend line break represents a shift in the balance of the market and is interpreted as the first sign that the countertrend traders are able to assert some control.

If the trend line break fails and the trend resumes, then the bars causing the trend line break now form a new point on a new trend line, one that will have a lower gradient, indicating a slowdown in the rally / sell-off. The alternative scenario on resumption of the trend is that it picks up strength and requires a new trend line, in this instance with a steeper gradient, which is worth mentioning for sake of completeness and to note that it is not a situation that presents new opportunities, just higher rewards on existing ones for the with-trend trader.

In the case that the trend line break actually appears to be the end of this trend, it's expected that the market will revisit this break-out level and the strength of the break will give the trader a good guess at the likelihood of the market turning around again when it returns to this level. If the trend line was broken by a strong move, it is considered likely that it killed the trend and the retrace to this level is a second opportunity to enter a countertrend position.

However, in trending markets, trend line breaks fail more often than not and set up with-trend entries. The psychology of the average trader tends to inhibit with-trend entries because the trader must "buy high", which is counter to the clichee for profitable trading "buy high, sell low". The allure of counter-trend trading and the impulse of human nature to want to fade the market in a good trend is very discernible to the price action trader, who would seek to take advantage by entering on failures, or at least when trying to enter counter-trend, would wait for that second entry opportunity at confirmation of the break-out once the market revisits this point, fails to get back into the trend and heads counter-trend again.

In-between trend line break-outs or swing highs and swing lows, price action traders watch for signs of strength in potential trends that are developing, which in the stock market index futures are with-trend gaps, discernible swings, large counter-trend bars (counter-intuitively), an absence of significant trend channel line overshoots, a lack of climax bars, few profitable counter-trend trades, small pull-backs, sideways corrections after trend line breaks, no consecutive sequence of closes on the wrong side of the moving average, shaved with-trend bars.

In the stock market indices, large trend days tend to display few signs of emotional trading with an absence of large bars and overshoots and this is put down to the effect of large institutions putting considerable quantities of their orders onto algorithm programs.

Many of the strongest trends start in the middle of the day after a reversal or a break-out from a trading range. The pull-backs are weak and offer little chance for price action traders to enter with-trend. Price action traders or in fact any traders can enter the market in what appears to be a run-away rally or sell-off, but price action trading involves waiting for an entry point with reduced risk - pull-backs, or better, pull-backs that turn into failed trend line break-outs. The risk is that the 'run-away' trend doesn't continue, but becomes a blow-off climactic reversal where the last traders to enter in desperation end up in losing positions on the market's reversal. As stated the market often only offers seemingly weak-looking entries during strong phases but price action traders will take these rather than make indiscriminate entries. Without practice and experience enough to recognise the weaker signals, traders will wait, even if it turns out that they miss a large move.

== Trend Channel ==
A trend or price channel can be created by plotting a pair of trend channel lines on either side of the market - the first trend channel line is the trend line, plus a parallel return line on the other side. Edwards and Magee's return line is also known as the trend channel line (singular), confusingly, when only one is mentioned.

Trend channels are traded by waiting for break-out failures, i.e. banking on the trend channel continuing, in which case at that bar's close, the entry stop is placed one tick away towards the centre of the channel above/below the break-out bar. Trading with the break-out only has a good probability of profit when the break-out bar is above average size, and an entry is taken only on confirmation of the break-out. The best reversals to enter a trade with have large reversal bars and a second entry within which to enter. The confirmation would be given when a pull-back from the break-out is over without the pull-back having retraced to the return line, so invalidating the plotted channel lines.

== Shaved bar entry ==
When a shaved bar appears in a strong trend, it demonstrates that the buying or the selling pressure was constant throughout with no let-up and it can be taken as a strong signal that the trend will continue.

A Brooks-style entry using a stop order one tick above or below the bar will require swift action from the trader and any delay will result in slippage especially on short time-frames.

== Microtrend line ==
If a trend line is plotted on the lower lows or the higher highs of a trend over a longer trend, a microtrend line is plotted when all or almost all of the highs or lows line up in a short multi-bar period. Just as break-outs from a normal trend are prone to fail as noted above, microtrend lines drawn on a chart are frequently broken by subsequent price action and these break-outs frequently fail too. Such a failure is traded by placing an entry stop order 1 tick above or below the previous bar, which would result in a with-trend position if hit, providing a low risk scalp with a target on the opposite side of the trend channel.

Microtrend lines are often used on retraces in the main trend or pull-backs and provide an obvious signal point where the market can break through to signal the end of the microtrend. The bar that breaks out of a bearish microtrend line in a main bull trend for example is the signal bar and the entry buy stop order should be placed 1 tick above the bar. If the market works its way above that break-out bar, it is a good sign that the break-out of the microtrend line has not failed and that the main bull trend has resumed.

Continuing this example, a more aggressive bullish trader would place a buy stop entry above the high of the current bar in the microtrend line and move it down to the high of each consecutive new bar, in the assumption that any microtrend line break-out will not fail.

== Spike and channel ==
This is a type of trend characterised as difficult to identify and more difficult to trade by Brooks. The spike is the beginning of the trend where the market moves strongly in the direction of the new trend, often at the open of the day on an intraday chart, and then slows down forming a tight trend channel that moves slowly but surely in the same direction.

After the trend channel is broken, it is common to see the market return to the level of the start of the channel and then to remain in a trading range between that level and the end of the channel.

A "gap spike and channel" is the term for a spike and channel trend that begins with a gap in the chart (a vertical gap with between one bar's close and the next bar's open).

The spike and channel is seen in stock charts and stock indices, and is rarely reported in forex markets by om.

== Pull-back ==
A pull-back is a move where the market interrupts the prevailing trend, or retraces from a breakout, but does not retrace beyond the start of the trend or the beginning of the breakout. A pull-back which does carry on further to the beginning of the trend or the breakout would instead become a reversal or a breakout failure.

In a long trend, a pull-back often last for long enough to form legs like a normal trend and to behave in other ways like a trend too. Like a normal trend, a long pull-back often has two legs. Price action traders expect the market to adhere to the two attempts rule and will be waiting for the market to try to make a second swing in the pull-back, with the hope that it fails and therefore turns around to try the opposite - i.e. the trend resumes.

One price action technique for following a pull-back with the aim of entering with-trend at the end of the pull-back is to count the new higher highs in the pull-back of a bull trend, or the new lower lows in the pull-back of a bear, i.e. in a bull trend, the pull-back will be composed of bars where the highs are successively lower and lower until the pattern is broken by a bar that puts in a high higher than the previous bar's high, termed an H1 (High 1). L1s (Low 1) are the mirror image in bear trend pull-backs.

If the H1 doesn't result in the end of the pull-back and a resumption of the bull trend, then the market creates a further sequence of bars going lower, with lower highs each time until another bar occurs with a high that's higher than the previous high. This is the H2. And so on until the trend resumes, or until the pull-back has become a reversal or trading range.

H1s and L1s are considered reliable entry signals when the pull-back is a microtrend line break, and the H1 or L1 represents the break-out's failure.

Otherwise if the market adheres to the two attempts rule, then the safest entry back into the trend will be the H2 or L2. The two-legged pull-back has formed and that is the most common pull-back, at least in the stock market indices.

Another important pull-back pattern in the upward trend is that there are several bars that close down, separated by a bar that closes upward. This pattern is generally a complex pull-back hidden in a lower time frame, which is a three leg structure, including the initial callback, followed by a small pull-back, failed attempts to restore the initial trend. Starting from the second stage, the market falls again, forming another reverse trend stage, usually as long as the first stage.

In a sideways market trading range, both highs and lows can be counted but this is reported to be an error-prone approach except for the most practiced traders.

On the other hand, in a strong trend, the pull-backs are liable to be weak and consequently the count of Hs and Ls will be difficult. In a bull trend pull-back, two swings down may appear but the H1s and H2s cannot be identified. The price action trader looks instead for a bear trend bar to form in the trend, and when followed by a bar with a lower high but a bullish close, takes this as the first leg of a pull-back and is thus already looking for the appearance of the H2 signal bar. The fact that it is technically neither an H1 nor an H2 is ignored in the light of the trend strength. This price action reflects what is occurring in the shorter time-frame and is sub-optimal but pragmatic when entry signals into the strong trend are otherwise not appearing. The same in reverse applies in bear trends.

Counting the Hs and Ls is straightforward price action trading of pull-backs, relying for further signs of strength or weakness from the occurrence of all or any price action signals, e.g. the action around the moving average, double tops or bottoms, ii or iii patterns, outside bars, reversal bars, microtrend line breaks, or at its simplest, the size of bull or bear trend bars in amongst the other action. The price action trader picks and chooses which signals to specialise in and how to combine them.

The simple entry technique involves placing the entry order 1 tick above the H or 1 tick below the L and waiting for it to be executed as the next bar develops. If so, this is the entry bar, and the H or L was the signal bar, and the protective stop is placed 1 tick under an H or 1 tick above an L.

== Breakout ==
A breakout is a bar in which the market moves beyond a predefined significant price - predefined by the price action trader, either physically or only mentally, according to their own price action methodology, e.g. if the trader believes a bull trend exists, then a line connecting the lowest lows of the bars on the chart during this trend would be the line that the trader watches, waiting to see if the market breaks out beyond it.

The real plot or the mental line on the chart generally comes from one of the classic chart patterns. A breakout often leads to a setup and a resulting trade signal.

The breakout is supposed to herald the end of the preceding chart pattern, e.g. a bull breakout in a bear trend could signal the end of the bear trend.

== Breakout pull-back ==
After a breakout extends further in the breakout direction for a bar or two or three, the market will often retrace in the opposite direction in a pull-back, i.e. the market pulls back against the direction of the breakout. A viable breakout will not pull-back past the former point of Support or Resistance that was broken through.

A small correction of one to five lines that occurs within the break-up lines, because it is usually expected that the break through will resume, and the pull-back is a preparation for recovery. For example, if one of the five lines breaks through the bear market trend line, but we think this trend will continue, we will consider shorting this sign, rather than buying it back immediately after breaking through. Another break through pull-back test is close to the original market entry price to test the loss and loss. It may exceed or fall below it for a few seconds. It can occur in one or two horizontal strips of the market entry, or after an extended movement.

== Breakout failure ==
A breakout might not lead to the end of the preceding market behaviour, and what starts as a pull-back can develop into a breakout failure, i.e. the market could return into its old pattern.

Brooks observes that a breakout is likely to fail on quiet range days on the very next bar, when the breakout bar is unusually big.

"Five tick failed breakouts" are a phenomenon that is a great example of price action trading. Five tick failed breakouts are characteristic of the stock index futures markets. Many speculators trade for a profit of just four ticks, a trade which requires the market to move 6 ticks in the trader's direction for the entry and exit orders to be filled. These traders will place protective stop orders to exit on failure at the opposite end of the breakout bar. So if the market breaks out by five ticks and does not hit their profit targets, then the price action trader will see this as a five tick failed breakout and will enter in the opposite direction at the opposite end of the breakout bar to take advantage of the stop orders from the losing traders' exit orders.

== Failed breakout failure ==
In the particular situation where a price action trader has observed a breakout, watched it fail and then decided to trade in the hope of profiting from the failure, there is the danger for the trader that the market will turn again and carry on in the direction of the breakout, leading to losses for the trader. This is known as a failed failure and is traded by taking the loss and reversing the position. It is not just breakouts where failures fail, other failed setups can at the last moment come good and be 'failed failures'.

== Reversal bar ==
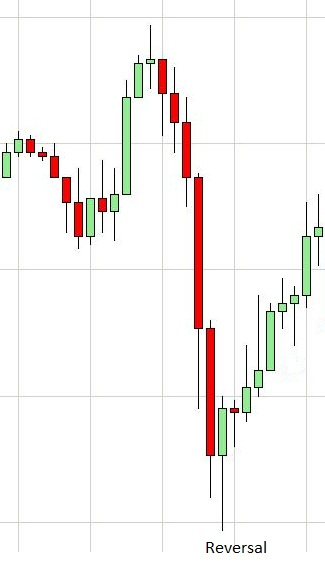
A bear trend reverses at a bull reversal bar.

A reversal bar signals a reversal of the current trend. On seeing a signal bar, a trader would take it as a sign that the market direction is about to turn.

An ideal bullish reversal bar should close considerably above its open, with a relatively large lower tail (30% to 50% of the bar height) and a small or absent upper tail, and having only average or below average overlap with the prior bar, and having a lower low than the prior bars in the trend.

A bearish reversal bar would be the opposite.

Reversals are considered to be stronger signals if their extreme point is even further up or down than the current trend would have achieved if it continued as before, e.g. a bullish reversal would have a low that is below the approximate line formed by the lows of the preceding bear trend. This is an 'overshoot'. See the section #Trend channel line overshoot.

Reversal bars as a signal are also considered to be stronger when they occur at the same price level as previous trend reversals.

The price action interpretation of a bull reversal bar is so: it indicates that the selling pressure in the market has passed its climax and that now the buyers have come into the market strongly and taken over, dictating price which rises up steeply from the low as the sudden relative paucity of sellers causes the buyers' bids to spring upwards. This movement is exacerbated by the short term traders / scalpers who sold at the bottom and now have to buy back if they want to cover their losses.

== Trend line break ==
When a market has been trending significantly, a trader can usually draw a trend line on the opposite side of the market where the retraces reach, and any retrace back across the existing trend line is a 'trend line break' and is a sign of weakness, a clue that the market might soon reverse its trend or at least halt the trend's progress for a period.

== Trend channel line overshoot ==
A trend channel line overshoot refers to the price shooting clear out of the observable trend channel further in the direction of the trend. An overshoot does not have to be a reversal bar, since it can occur during a with-trend bar. On occasion it may not result in a reversal at all, it will just force the price action trader to adjust the trend channel definition.

In the stock indices, the common retrace of the market after a trend channel line overshoot is put down to profit taking and traders reversing their positions. More traders will wait for some reversal price action. The extra surge that causes an overshoot is the action of the last traders panicking to enter the trend along with increased activity from institutional players who are driving the market and want to see an overshoot as a clear signal that all the previously non-participating players have been dragged in. This is identified by the overshoot bar being a climactic exhaustion bar on high volume. It leaves nobody left to carry on the trend and sets up the price action for a reversal.

== Climactic exhaustion reversal ==
A strong trend characterised by multiple with-trend bars and almost continuous higher highs or lower lows over a double-digit number of bars is often ended abruptly by a climactic exhaustion bar. It is likely that a two-legged retrace occurs after this, extending for the same length of time or more as the final leg of the climactic rally or sell-off.

== Double top and double bottom ==
When the market reaches an extreme price in the trader's view, it often pulls back from the price only to return to that price level again. In the situation where that price level holds and the market retreats again, the two reversals at that level are known as a double top bear flag or a double bottom bull flag, or simply double top / double bottom and indicate that the retrace will continue.

Brooks also reports that a pull-back is common after a double top or bottom, returning 50% to 95% back to the level of the double top / bottom. This is similar to the classic head and shoulders pattern.

A price action trader will trade this pattern, e.g. a double bottom, by placing a buy stop order 1 tick above the bar that created the second 'bottom'. If the order is filled, then the trader sets a protective stop order 1 tick below the same bar.

== Double top twin and double bottom twin ==
Consecutive bars with relatively large bodies, small tails and the same high price formed at the highest point of a chart are interpreted as double top twins. The opposite is so for double bottom twins. These patterns appear on as shorter time scale as a double top or a double bottom. Since signals on shorter time scales are per se quicker and therefore on average weaker, price action traders will take a position against the signal when it is seen to fail.

In other words, double top twins and double bottom twins are with-trend signals, when the underlying short time frame double tops or double bottoms (reversal signals) fail. The price action trader predicts that other traders trading on the shorter time scale will trade the simple double top or double bottom, and if the market moves against them, the price action trader will take a position against them, placing an entry stop order 1 tick above the top or below the bottom, with the aim of benefitting from the exacerbated market movement caused by those trapped traders bailing out.

== Opposite twin (down-up or up-down twin) ==
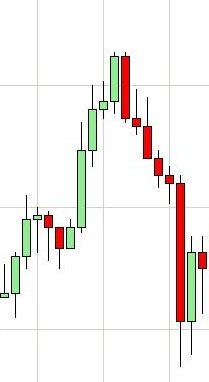
An Up-Down Pattern.

This is two consecutive trend bars in opposite directions with similar sized bodies and similar sized tails. It is a reversal signal when it appears in a trend. It is equivalent to a single reversal bar if viewed on a time scale twice as long.

For the strongest signal, the bars would be shaved at the point of reversal, e.g. a down-up in a bear trend with two trend bars with shaved bottoms would be considered stronger than bars with tails.

== Wedge ==
A wedge pattern is like a trend, but the trend channel lines that the trader plots are converging and predict a breakout. A wedge pattern after a trend is commonly considered to be a good reversal signal.

== Trading range ==
Once a trader has identified a trading range, i.e. the lack of a trend and a ceiling to the market's upward movement and a floor to any downward move, then the trader will use the ceiling and floor levels as barriers that the market can break through, with the expectation that the break-outs will fail and the market will reverse.

One break-out above the previous highest high or ceiling of a trading range is termed a higher high. Since trading ranges are difficult to trade, the price action trader will often wait after seeing the first higher high and on the appearance of a second break-out followed by its failure, this will be taken as a high probability bearish trade, with the middle of the range as the profit target. This is favoured firstly because the middle of the trading range will tend to act as a magnet for price action, secondly because the higher high is a few points higher and therefore offers a few points more profit if successful, and thirdly due to the supposition that two consecutive failures of the market to head in one direction will result in a tradable move in the opposite.

== Chop aka churn and barb wire ==
When the market is restricted within a tight trading range and the bar size as a percentage of the trading range is large, price action signals may still appear with the same frequency as under normal market conditions but their reliability or predictive powers are severely diminished. Brooks identifies one particular pattern that betrays chop, called "barb wire". It consists of a series of bars that overlap heavily containing trading range bars.

Barb wire and other forms of chop demonstrate that neither the buyers nor the sellers are in control or able to exert greater pressure. A price action trader that wants to generate profit in choppy conditions would use a range trading strategy. Trades are executed at the support or resistance lines of the range while profit targets are set before price is set to hit the opposite side.

Especially after the appearance of barb wire, breakout bars are expected to fail and traders will place entry orders just above or below the opposite end of the breakout bar from the direction in which it broke out.

== More chart patterns favoured by price action traders ==
- Broadening top
- Flag and pennant patterns
- Gap
- Island reversal
- Price channels
- Support and resistance
- Triangle
- Triple top and triple bottom
