= Morning star (candlestick pattern) =

Pattern seen in stock market chart

Illustration of the morningstar pattern

The Morning Star is a pattern seen in a candlestick chart, a popular type of a chart used by technical analysts to anticipate or predict price action of a security, derivative, or currency over a short period of time.

== Description ==
The pattern is made up of three candles: normally a long bearish candle, followed by a short bullish or bearish doji or a small body candlestick, which is then followed by a long bullish candle. To have a valid Morning Star formation, most traders look for the top of the third candle to be at least halfway up the body of the first candle in the pattern. Black candles indicate falling prices, and white candles indicate rising prices.

== Interpretation ==
When found in a downtrend, this pattern can be an indication that a reversal in the price trend is going to take place. What the pattern represents from a supply and demand point of view is a lot of selling in the period of the first black candle. Then, a period of lower trading with a reduced range, which indicates indecision in the market, forms the second candle. This is followed by a large white candle, which represents buyers taking control of the market. As the Morning Star is a three-candle pattern, traders often don't wait for confirmation from a fourth candle before they buy the stock. High volumes on the third trading day confirm the pattern. Traders look at the size of the candles for an indication of the size of the potential reversal. The larger the white and black candle, and the higher the white candle moves in relation to the black candle, the larger the potential reversal.

The chart below illustrates.

The Morning Star pattern is circled. Note the high trading volumes on the third day.

The Morning Star belongs to a small group of three-candle bullish reversal formations described in technical-analysis literature, alongside the three white soldiers and other star patterns.

The opposite occurring at the top of an uptrend is called an evening star.

== See also ==
- Candlestick pattern
- Honma Munehisa
- Steve Nison
- Technical analysis
- Chart pattern
