= Anne-Marie Baiynd =

American author and financial analyst

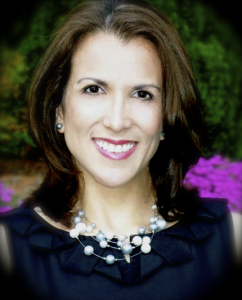
- Born: January 11, 1966 (age 60); Port of Spain, Trinidad
- Occupations: Non-fiction writer, financial analyst
- Writing career
- Notable works: "The Trading Book: A Complete Solution to Mastering Technical Systems and Trading Psychology" (2011)

Anne-Marie Baiynd (born January 11, 1966) is an American author, financial analyst, technical analyst. Baiynd published her Market Positioning System (MPS) in 2011 to educate beginning day traders on the tools and techniques that have her listed in Traders at Work: World's Most Successful Traders Make Their Living in the Markets. Baiynd runs a day trading room where subscribers can follow her trades online and provides swing trading set-ups as well as trading education through her web site.

== Background ==
Baiynd majored in applied mathematics at the University of North Carolina at Asheville. Her master's work included "statistics, biostatistics, and behavioral studies".

In 1994, Baiynd began conducting research on the efficacy of vagus nerve stimulation in the treatment of intractable epilepsy at Carolina Neurological. From there she began engaging the public as a corporate speaker and trainer. She also held a position as a vice president of sales and eventually served as CEO of the recruitment firm, SPIRIT ipds, Inc., until 2006.

While attending a SUCCESS magazine convention in 2005, she was introduced to technical analysis at a session led by Phil Town. After 14 years in recruiting she took this opportunity to make a change in her career.

Baiynd took one class from Investools and began trading real money. After struggling in the markets for 18 months, Baiynd stopped trading with real money and began paper trading to learn market rhythms. Baiynd is primarily a self-taught technical analyst though she does credit Brian Shannon and Peter Reznicek for her learning about multiple time frames and market internals such as ticks. Early in her career she considered herself primarily a swing trader. Baiynd applies technical analysis for trades on multiple time frames for shorter term trading and not for longer term "Buy and hold" investments.

Soon after StockTwits launched their services in 2009, Baiynd joined the service and began offering trade suggestions and advice. StockTwits founder Howard Lindzon, in his book The StockTwits Edge, states that "While I've not met Anne-Marie, her reputation for good ideas is second to none. She offers complete and detailed ideas around her strategy and then follows up with commentary on how trades performed." In the 2013 E-book on THE BEST OF THE BEST by Brian Lund, Baiynd's mental and chart analysis philosophies from StockTwits are quoted.

Baiynd was interviewed as one of the "World's Most Successful Traders" by Tim Bourquin and Nicholas Mango in their book Traders at Work: How the World's Most Successful Traders Make Their Living in the Markets.

She can currently be seen on TopstepTV most days of the week through her partnership with the prop firm Topstep.

== Market Positioning System ==
Baiynd first published her Market Positioning System (MPS) in 2011. She covers the details of the MPS in detail in her first book The Trading Book: A Complete Solution to Mastering Technical Systems and Trading Psychology. The book is geared towards beginning day traders.

One unique feature in the book is that Baiynd speaks explicitly about her failures early in her trading career and what she did to overcome these challenges. She describes in great detail with large charts her MPS and how she trades the momentum as the prices move. Her MPS applies the concepts of support and resistance levels, price channels, moving averages, Fibonacci retracements and Bollinger Bands to select the proper time to enter a trade long or sell short. Even though the book is written with the novice in mind, traders that already use these tools can take away information about their subtleties.

Baiynd also describes the need to create a trading journal to log your daily activities so that you can perform a through after action review of trades that went well as well as those that did not. She also follows up with examples from her own journal. This builds a framework around her discussions on the psychological side of trading.

In the book review by the magazine Futures, reviewer Leslie Masonson states that Baiynd provides a very "actionable and pragmatic approach to day trading." Brenda Jubin at Seeking Alpha stated that the book "may not be the greatest thing since white bread, but it’s a darned good read."
