= Hanging man =

Hanging man may refer to:

- Hanging man (candlestick pattern), a pattern in financial analysis
- The Hanging Man (tarot card), a tarot card
- Hanging Man, a play by Andrew Upton

== See also ==
- Death by hanging
- The Hanged Man (disambiguation)
- Hangman (disambiguation)
- Hanging Maw
