= Hikkake pattern =

The hikkake pattern, or hikkake, is a technical analysis pattern used for determining market turning-points and continuations. It is a simple pattern that can be observed in market price data, using traditional bar charts, point and figure charts, or Japanese candlestick charts. The pattern does not belong to the collection of traditional candlestick chart patterns.

Though some have referred to the hikkake pattern as an "inside day false breakout" or a "fakey pattern", these are deviations from the original name given to the pattern by Daniel L. Chesler, CMT and are not popularly used to describe the pattern. For example, the name "hikkake pattern" has been chosen over "inside day false breakout" or "fakey pattern" by the majority of book authors who have covered the subject, including: "Technical Analysis: The Complete Resource for Financial Market Technicians" by Charles D. Kirkpatrick and Julie R. Dahlquist, and "Long/Short Market Dynamics: Trading Strategies for Today's Markets" by Clive M. Corcoran, and "Diary of a Professional Commodity Trader" by Peter L. Brandt.

== Conceptual basis ==
The pattern consists of a measurable period of rest and volatility contraction in the market, followed by a relatively brief price move that encourages unsuspecting traders and investors to adopt a false assumption regarding the likely future direction of price. The pattern, once formed, yields its own set of trading parameters for the time and price of market entry, the dollar risk amount (i.e., where to place protective stops), and the expected profit target. The pattern is not meant as a stand alone "system" for market speculation, but rather as an ancillary technique to traditional technical and fundamental market analysis methods.

== Description ==
The pattern is recognized in two variants, one bearish and one bullish. In both variants, the first bar of the pattern is an inside bar (i.e., one which has both a higher low and a lower high, compared with the previous bar). This is then followed by either a bar with both higher low and higher high for the bearish variant, or with lower low and lower high for the bullish variant. Before the pattern produces a trading signal it must be confirmed; this happens when the price passes below the low of the first bar of the pattern (in the bearish variant) or above the high of the first bar (in the bullish variant). Confirmation must occur within three periods of the last bar of the signal for the signal to be considered valid.

== Origin ==
The hikkake pattern was first conceived and introduced to the financial community through a series of published articles written by technical analyst Daniel L. Chesler, CMT. The phrase "Hikkake" is a Japanese verb which means to "trick" or "ensnare." Chesler chose the name "hikkake" after consulting with Yohey Arakawa, Associate Professor of Japanese, Tokyo University of Foreign Studies.

== Institutional uses and peer recognition ==
The hikkake pattern has been adopted for use by IntStream Oy, a global data distributor of the Nordic electricity energy market Nord Pool, in their E2 energy market analysis platform designed for use by institutional traders. The hikkake pattern has also been chosen for inclusion among other foundational, technical analysis chart patterns comprising the Market Technicians Association Educational Foundation (MTAEF), College Level Introduction to Technical Analysis. The hikkake pattern has attracted international attention among the financial community.
