= Double top =

Double top may refer to:

- Double top and double bottom, reversal chart patterns observed in the technical analysis of financial trading markets of stocks, commodities, currencies, and other assets
- a double twenty score in darts
