= Price channels =

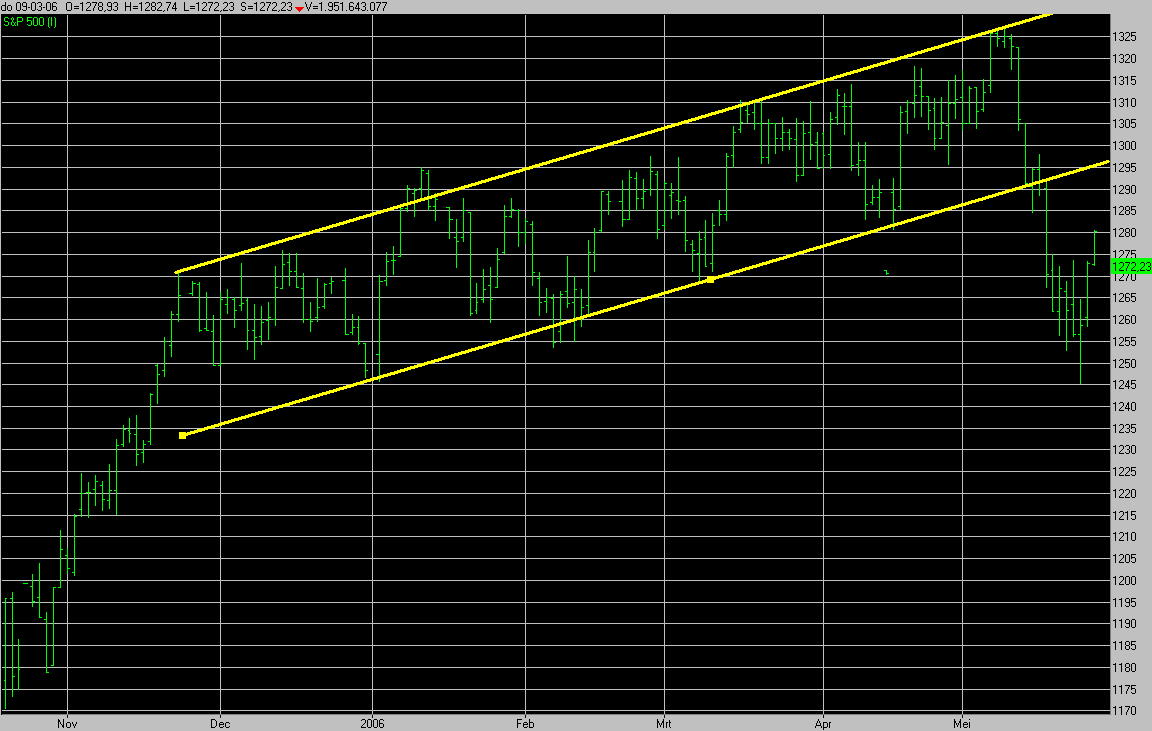
Trend channel

A price channel is a pair of parallel trend lines that form a chart pattern for a stock or commodity. Channels may be horizontal, ascending or descending. When prices pass through and stay through a trendline representing support or resistance, the trend is said to be broken and there is a "breakout".

== See also ==
- Bollinger Bands
- Control chart
- Donchian channel
- Richard Donchian
