= H&S =

H&S can refer to:

- Health and safety, a cross-disciplinary area concerned with protecting people's safety, health and welfare.
- Head & Shoulders, a brand of shampoo
- Head and shoulders (chart pattern), a graphing pattern commonly found in financial markets
- Hack and slash, a role-playing game play style
- Headquarters and Service Company or Headquarters and Service Battalion in a U.S. Marine Corps regiment
- Hobbs and Shaw, a movie from the Fast & Furious franchise
