= Harami =

Harami may refers to:

- Harami (candlestick pattern)
- Harami language, an Old South Arabian or Ṣayhadic language spoken in Yemen. ISO 639-3 code xha
- "Harami" (song), 2019 song by Samra
- Harami, Kabadüz, Turkey
