= Munehisa =

- Gender: Male

Origin
- Origin: Japanese
- Meaning: Different meanings depending on the kanji used

Munehisa (written: 宗久) is a masculine Japanese given name. Notable people with the name include:

- Homma Munehisa (本間 宗久; 1724–1803), Japanese stock trader
- Munehisa Kuroiwa (黒岩 宗久; born 1966), Japanese speed skater
- Munehisa Sakai (境宗久), Japanese director
