= Triangle (chart pattern) =

Chart pattern in asset price charts

Triangles within technical analysis are chart patterns commonly found in the price charts of financially traded assets (stocks, bonds, futures, etc.). The pattern derives its name from the fact that it is characterized by a contraction in price range and converging trend lines, thus giving it a triangular shape.

Triangle patterns can be broken down into three categories: the ascending triangle, the descending triangle, and the symmetrical triangle. While the shape of the triangle is significant, of more importance is the direction that the market moves when it breaks out of the triangle. Lastly, while triangles can sometimes be reversal patterns—meaning a reversal of the prior trend—they are normally seen as continuation patterns (meaning a continuation of the prior trend).

== See also ==
- Technical analysis
- Chart pattern
- Support (technical analysis)
