= Hangman =

Hangman most often refers to:

- Executioner, a person who carries out a death sentence by hanging
- Hangman (game), a game of guessing a word or phrase one letter at a time

Hangman may also refer to:

== Arts and entertainment ==
=== Comics ===
- Hangman (DC Comics), an enemy of Batman
- Hangman (Marvel Comics), the name of a couple of different characters in the Marvel Universe
- Hangman (Archie Comics), a number of Archie Comics superheroes
- Hangman Comics, a Golden Age MLJ/Archie Comics imprint comics title featuring the Hangman

=== Films ===
- The Hangman (1928 film), a German silent film
- The Hangman (1959 film), an American Western directed by Michael Curtiz
- Hangman, a 2001 television film featuring Mädchen Amick and Lou Diamond Phillips
- The Hangman (2005 film), an Indian film starring Om Puri and Shreyas Talpade
- Hangman (2015 film), a British found-footage film starring Jeremy Sisto
- Hangman (2017 film), an American crime thriller film starring Al Pacino

=== Literature ===
- "The Hangman" (poem), a 1954 poem by Maurice Ogden, and a 1964 animated short based on the poem
- Hangman, a 2000 novel by Michael Slade
- "Hangman", a short story by David Drake in his 1979 collection Hammer's Slammers

=== Songs ===
- "Hangman", by Black Stone Cherry from Kentucky, 2016
- "Hangman", by Chapman Whitney from Chapman Whitney Streetwalkers, 1974
- "Hangman", by Cory Marks from Sorry for Nothing Vol. 2, 2025
- "Hangman", by Dave, 2018
- "Hangman", by Krokus from Hellraiser, 2006
- "Hangman", by Queen from their debut album's deluxe edition, 2024
- "The Maid Freed from the Gallows", a folk song sometimes given the title "Hangman"

=== Other ===
- Hangman (video game), a 1978 game for the Atari 2600 based on the guessing game
- Videocart-18: Hangman, a 1978 video game for the Fairchild Channel F
- The Hangman (roller coaster), a 1990s roller coaster at Opryland USA in Nashville, Tennessee
- Hangman Books, a British independent small press, and associated film and record projects

== Places ==
- Hangman cliffs, on the north coast of Devon, England
- Hangman Island, in Boston Harbor, Massachusetts, US
- Hangman Creek, or Latah Creek, in Washington and Idaho, US
- Hangman Creek, a tributary of the White Salmon River via Gilmer Creek; see List of rivers of Washington (state)

== People ==
=== Nickname ===
- Henry Hawley ("Hangman Hawley") (c. 1679–1759), British Army lieutenant general
- Reinhard Heydrich (1904–1942), German Nazi, one of the main architects of the Holocaust

=== Ring name ===
- Jean-Neil Guay (born 1942), Canadian professional wrestler
- Hangman Hughes (born 1974), Canadian professional wrestler
- Bobby Jaggers (1948–2012), American professional wrestler
- Gene LeBell (1932–2022), American martial artist, professional wrestler, stunt performer, and actor
- Adam Page (born 1991), American professional wrestler

== See also ==
- Hangmen (disambiguation)
- Hang (disambiguation)
- Hanging tree (disambiguation)
- The Hanged Man (disambiguation)
- Hanging man (candlestick pattern), a type of pattern on a market pricing graph
