= Hangmen =

Hangmen is the plural of hangman; an executioner who carries out a death sentence by hanging.

Hangmen, or The Hangmen, may also refer to:

- Hangmen (DC Comics), a DC Comics supervillain team
- Hangmen (film), a 1987 American film
- Hangmen (play), a play by Martin McDonagh
- The Hangmen (British band)
- The Hangmen (Washington, D.C. band)
- Hangmen Motorcycle Club

== See also ==
- Hangman (disambiguation)
