= Breakout (technical analysis) =

Term in technical analysis

A breakout is when prices pass through and stay through an area of support or resistance. On the technical analysis chart a break out occurs when price of a stock or commodity exits an area pattern. Oftentimes, a stock or commodity will bounce between the areas of support and resistance and when it breaks through either one of these barriers you can consider the direction that it's heading in a trend. Often the resistance level the price breaks through becomes a new support level, and vice versa. This can be a "Buy" or "Sell" signal depending on which barrier it broke through.

Support and resistance levels are seen as 'stronger' if a stock hits them multiple times. In turn, stocks that break through these 'stronger' barriers are more likely to then go on extended moves. Stocks are not the only assets to break beyond support and resistance levels. Any market favoured by technical traders can see breakouts - including commodities and forex.

Traders and active investors use breakouts to identify trends in their early stages. They are often followed by price action and renewed volatility, making them a fertile area to find profitable opportunities.
