= The Hanged Man =

The Hanged Man may refer to:

- A man who has been hanged
- The Hanged Man (tarot card), a Major Arcana tarot card
- The Hanged Man, a 1997 album by Poisoned Electrick Head
- "The Hanged Man", song by Moonspell from their 1998 album, Sin/Pecado
- "The Hanged Man", song by Dark Moor from their 2007 album Tarot
- The Hanged Man, 1994 short novel by Francesca Lia Block
- The Hanged Man, a 2017 album by Ted Leo

== TV and cinema ==
- The Hanged Man (1964 film), an American television film starring Robert Culp
- The Hanged Man (1974 film), an American television film, starring Steve Forrest
- The Hanged Man (TV series), a British crime drama (1975)
- "The Hanged Man" (Journeyman), a 2007 episode of the American TV series Journeyman
- "The Hanged Man" (Da Vinci's Demons), a 2013 episode of the American TV series Da Vinci's Demons

== See also ==
- Hangman (disambiguation)
- Hanging man (candlestick pattern), a type of pattern on a market pricing graph
