= Triple top and triple bottom =

Triple top and triple bottom are reversal chart patterns used in the technical analysis of stocks, commodities, currencies, and other assets.

== Triple top ==
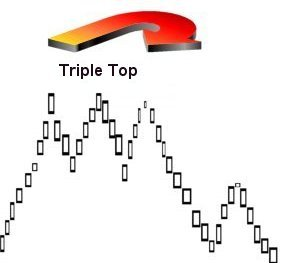
Triple top confirmation

Formation

The formation of triple tops is rarer than that of double tops in the rising market trend. The volume is usually low during the second rally up and lesser during the formation of the third top. The peaks may not necessarily be spaced evenly like those which constitute a Double top. The intervening valleys may not bottom out at exactly the same level, i.e. either the first or second may be lower. The triple top is confirmed when the price decline from the third top falls below the bottom of the lowest valley between the three peaks.

Selling strategy

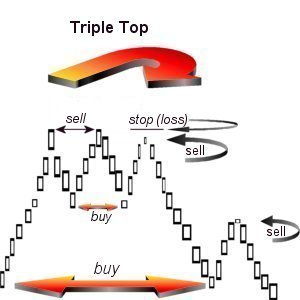
Opportunity

There are several different trading strategies that can be employed to take advantage of this formation. Of course, first and second peaks are perfect point to place sell orders. After the double top has been confirmed and if prices are moving up again with low volume, it is an opportune point to sell. One can sell short with a stop (calculated loss) above the highest peak of the Double top. The next opportune point to sell would be after a Triple top has formed and a fourth top is being formed at the lower level.

Notes Observation shows that it is rare to see four tops or bottoms at equal levels. In case prices continue to rally up to the level of the three previous tops, there is a good chance that they will rally up higher. If they come down to the same level a fourth time, they usually decline.

Triple tops are also noted to be similar to barts as found in cryptocurrency trading.

== Triple bottom ==
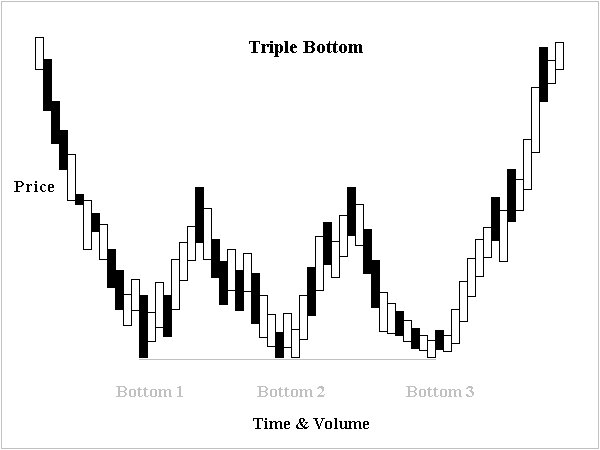
Triple bottom

Most of the rules that are applied in the formation of the triple top can be reversed in the formation of triple bottom. As far as volume is concerned, the third low bottom should be on low volume and the rally up from that bottom should show a marked increase in activity.

The formation of Triple bottom occurs during the period of accumulation.
