= Three black crows =

Stock market term

Three crows is a term used by stock market analysts to describe a market downturn. It appears on a candlestick chart in the financial markets. It unfolds across three trading sessions, and consists of three long candlesticks that trend downward like a staircase. Each candle should open below the previous day's open, ideally in the middle price range of that previous day. Each candlestick should also close progressively downward to establish a new near-term low. The pattern indicates a strong price reversal from a bull market to a bear market.

The three crows help to confirm that a bull market has ended and market sentiment has turned negative. In Japanese Candlestick Charting Techniques, technical analyst Steve Nison says "The three crows would likely be useful for longer-term traders."

This candlestick pattern has a counterpart known as the Three white soldiers, whose attributes help identify a bullish reversal or market upswing.

== See also ==
- Technical analysis
- Market timing
