= Three white soldiers =

Three white soldiers is a candlestick chart pattern in the financial markets. It unfolds across three trading sessions and represents a strong price reversal from a bear market to a bull market. The pattern consists of three long candlesticks that trend upward like a staircase; each should open above the previous day's open, ideally in the middle price range of that previous day. Each candlestick should also close progressively upward to establish a new near-term high.

The three white soldiers help to confirm that a bear market has ended and market sentiment has turned positive. In Candlestick Charting Explained, technical analyst Gregory L. Morris says "This type of price action is very bullish and should never be ignored."

This candlestick pattern has an opposite known as the Three Black Crows, which shares the same attributes in reverse.

== See also ==
- Candlestick chart
- Technical analysis
- Market timing
