= Fibonacci retracement =

Technical analysis method (Finance)

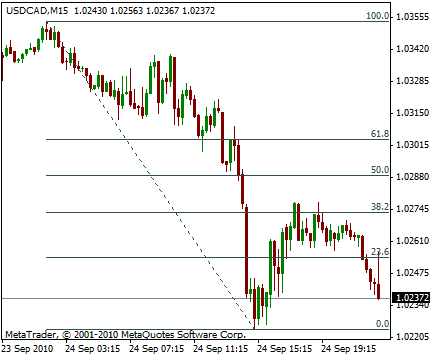
Fibonacci retracement levels shown on the USD/CAD currency pair. In this case, price retraced approximately 38.2% of a move down before continuing.

In finance, Fibonacci retracement is a method of technical analysis for determining support and resistance levels. It is named after the Fibonacci sequence of numbers, whose ratios provide price levels to which markets tend to retrace a portion of a move, before a trend continues in the original direction.

A Fibonacci retracement forecast is created by taking two extreme points on a chart and dividing the vertical distance by Fibonacci ratios. 0% is considered to be the start of the retracement, while 100% is a complete reversal to the original price before the move. Horizontal lines are drawn in the chart for these price levels to provide support and resistance levels. Common levels are 23.6%, 38.2%, 50%, and 61.8%. The significance of such levels, however, could not be confirmed by examining the data. Arthur Merrill in Filtered Waves determined there is no reliably standard retracement.

The appearance of retracement can be ascribed to price volatility as described by Burton Malkiel, a Princeton economist in his book A Random Walk Down Wall Street.

== Common uses ==
Fibonacci retracement is a popular tool that technical traders use to help identify strategic places for transactions, stop losses or target prices to help traders get in at a good price. The main idea behind the tool is the support and resistance values for a currency pair trend at which the most important breaks or bounces can appear. The retracement concept is used in many indicators such as Tirone levels, Gartley patterns, Elliott wave principle, and more. After a significant movement in price (be it up or down) the new support and resistance levels are often at these lines.

Unlike moving averages, Fibonacci retracement levels are static prices. This allows quick and simple identification and allows traders and investors to react when price levels are tested. Because these levels are inflection points, traders expect some type of price action, either a break or a rejection. The 61.8% (0.618) Fibonacci retracement that is often used by financial analysts corresponds to the golden ratio.

== Criticism ==
Extensive backtests of Fibonacci retracement over thousands of stocks have shown that the retracements values of 38%, 50%, and 62% had been no likelier to appear than any other of the possible retracement values.

== See also ==
- Elliott wave principle
- Trend line
