= Psychological level =

In finance, psychological level, is a price level in technical analysis that significantly affects the price of an underlying security, commodity or a derivative. Typically, the number is something that is "easy to remember," such as a rounded-off number. When a specific security, commodity, or derivative reaches such a price, financial market participants (traders, market makers, brokers, investors, etc.) tend to act on their positions (buy, sell or hold).

== Examples ==
1. Dow Jones Industrial Average Index - $14,000.00 - the all-time high psychological thousandth level as of 11/9/2007. Also known as "Dow 14,000"
2. Crude Oil (light, sweet) - $100.00/barrel

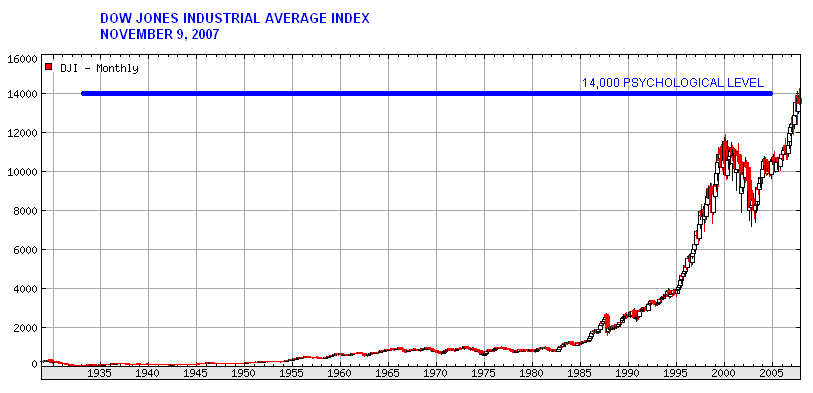
