= Harami (candlestick pattern) =

Japanese candlestick pattern

Harami is a type of Japanese candlestick pattern represented by two bodies, the first of them, larger, with black or red body and the second one, white or green. Its name derives from the Japanese word that means “pregnant” because the graphic that shows resembles a pregnant woman. Generally, the Harami pattern candlestick shows a changing trend. Like other Japanese patterns it too can be bullish or bearish.

A bearish harami is a two bar Japanese candlestick pattern that suggests prices may soon reverse to the downside.
