= Wedge pattern =

Market trend

In technical analysis, a wedge pattern is a chart formation characterized by a contracting price range bounded by two converging trendlines. The pattern illustrates a temporary pause or consolidation within a market trend and is classified into two types: a rising wedge and a falling wedge.

Unlike symmetrical triangles, both boundary lines of a wedge slope in the same direction. Wedge formations typically appear within minor or intermediate trends. Once the price breaks out from the boundary lines, the primary trend generally resumes, and the wedge loses its effectiveness as a technical indicator.

== Falling wedge ==
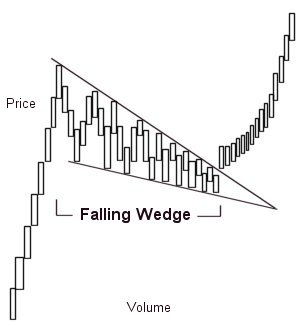
Falling wedge

A falling wedge forms when the market makes lower highs and lower lows within a narrowing range. When it appears during a broader downward trend, it serves as a bullish reversal pattern, indicating that the downtrend is losing momentum. When found within an ongoing uptrend, it acts as a bullish continuation pattern, indicating a temporary market correction before the upward trend resumes.

In a falling wedge, the upper boundary line descends at a steeper angle than the lower support line. Trading volume typically diminishes as the price range narrows. Following a decisive upside breakout, trading activity increases, though prices may move sideways before establishing a clear uptrend.

== Rising wedge ==
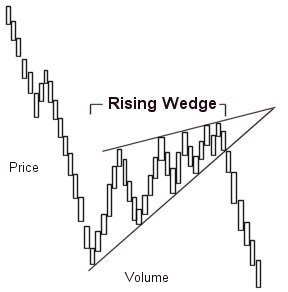
Rising wedge

A rising wedge forms when the market makes higher highs and higher lows within a contracting range. Within an ongoing uptrend, it is interpreted as a bearish reversal pattern, signaling weakening demand at higher price levels. Within a broader downtrend, it acts as a bearish continuation pattern, indicating a temporary upward correction before the downward trend resumes.

In a rising wedge, the lower boundary line ascends at a steeper angle than the upper resistance line. Trading volumes steadily decline with each upward wave, reflecting diminishing buying pressure. A rising wedge is statistically more reliable when it forms during a primary downtrend. During an uptrend, similar structures may instead resolve as flags or pennants.
