= Hanging tree (disambiguation) =

A hanging tree is any tree used to perform executions by hanging.

Hanging tree or The Hanging Tree may also refer to:

- Gallows, a frame for carrying out execution by hanging

== Music ==
- The Hanging Tree (band), an Australian stoner rock band of the mid to late 1990s

=== Songs ===
- "Hanging Tree" (Counting Crows song)
- "The Hanging Tree" (Marty Robbins song) (1959)
- "The Hanging Tree" (The Hunger Games song) (2014)
- "The Hanging Tree", a 1998 song by Arena from The Visitor
- "Hanging Tree", a 2001 song by Blackmore's Night from Fires at Midnight
- "Hanging Tree", a 2001 song by The Desert Sessions from Volumes 7 & 8
  - "Hanging Tree", a 2002 cover by Queens of the Stone Age from Songs for the Deaf
- "Hangin' Tree", a 1988 song by Green River from Sub Pop 200
- "Hanging Tree", a 1990 song by Bob Mould from Black Sheets of Rain
- "Hanging Tree", a 1977 song by Uriah Heep from Firefly

== Other uses ==
- Hanging tree (United States), any tree used to perform executions by hanging
- The Hanging Tree (Aaronovitch novel), a 2016 novel by Ben Aaronovitch
- The Hanging Tree (Johnson novel), a 1957 novel by Dorothy M. Johnson
- The Hanging Tree (film), a 1959 movie directed by Delmer Daves, based on the novel by Dorothy Johnson
