= Doji =

Common pattern in financial analysis

The doji (Japanese: どうじ 同事; lit. 'same matter') is a commonly found pattern in a candlestick chart of financially traded assets (stocks, bonds, futures, etc.) in technical analysis. A Doji forms when the open and close of a candlestick are equal, or very close to equal. Considered a neutral formation suggesting indecision between buyers and sellers–bullish or bearish bias depends on previous price swing, or trend. Length of upper and lower shadows (wicks and tails) may vary giving the appearance of a plus sign, cross, or inverted cross. It is characterized by being small in length—meaning a small trading range—with an opening and closing price that are virtually equal. The efficacy of technical analysis is disputed by the efficient-market hypothesis, which states that stock market prices are essentially unpredictable.

The doji represents indecision in the market. A doji is not as significant if the market is not clearly trending, as non-trending markets are inherently indicative of indecision. If the doji forms in an uptrend or downtrend, this is normally seen as significant, as it is a signal that the buyers are losing conviction when formed in an uptrend and a signal that sellers are losing conviction if seen in a downtrend.

== Types of Doji ==
Neutral: Dojis form when the opening and closing prices are virtually equal. Alone, dojis are neutral patterns.

Long-Legged: This doji reflects a great amount of indecision about the future direction of the underlying asset.

Gravestone: The long upper shadow suggests that the direction of the trend may be nearing a major turning point. It is formed when the opening and closing price of the underlying asset are equal and occur at the low of the day.

Dragonfly: The long lower shadow suggests that the direction of the trend may be nearing a major turning point. It is formed when the opening and closing price of the underlying asset are equal and occur at the high of the day.

A doji is a key trend reversal indicator. This is particularly true when there is a high trading volume following an extended move in either direction. When a market has been in an uptrend and trades to a higher high than the previous three trading days, fails to hold that high, and closes in the lower 10% of that day's trading range, there is a high probability of a downtrend in the ensuing days. Likewise, when the market has been in a downtrend and trades to a new low that's lower than the three previous trading days, fails to hold that low, and closes in the upper 10% of that day's trading range, there is a high probability of an uptrend in the ensuing days.

== Uses of the Doji indicator ==
A Doji indicator is mostly used in patterns, and it is actually a neutral pattern itself. Thus, when used alone, it doesn't provide reliable signals. By itself, the Doji candlestick only shows that investors are in doubt. However, there are main patterns that can be easily found on the chart.

Specifically, there are two patterns purportedly providing trend confirmation:

- The morning Doji star is a three-candlestick pattern that works in a strong downtrend. If, after a long bearish candle, there is a gap down and a formation of the Doji candlestick, it's a signal of possible reversal up. In order to confirm this, the third candle should be bullish and open with a gap up covering the previous gap down.
- The evening Doji star is the opposite of the morning Doji star. So, it works in a strong uptrend. A big bullish candle should be followed by a Doji one with a gap up. The trend reversal is confirmed if the third candle is bearish and opens with a gap down that covers the previous gap up.

== See also ==
- Candlestick chart
- Candlestick pattern
