= Gap (chart pattern) =

Price chart analysis concept

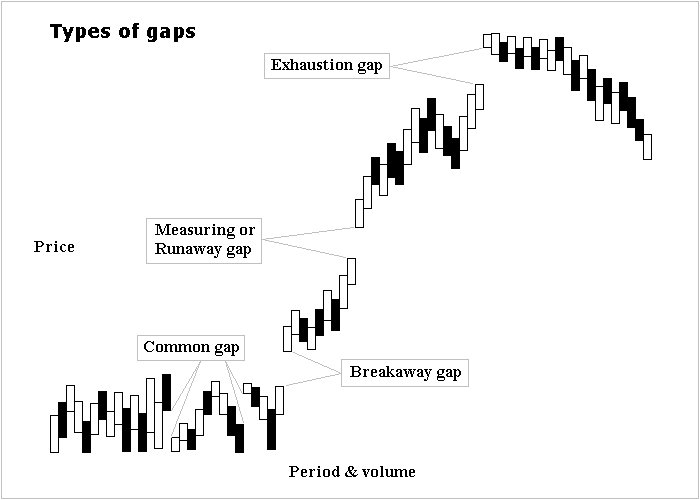
Sequence of Gaps

A gap is defined as an unfilled space or interval. On a technical analysis chart, a gap represents an area where no trading takes place. On the Japanese candlestick chart, a window is interpreted as a gap. Gaps are spaces on a chart that emerge when the price of the financial instrument significantly changes with little or no trading in between.

In an upward trend, a gap is produced when the highest price of one day is lower than the lowest price of the following day. Conversely, in a downward trend, a gap occurs when the lowest price of any one day is higher than the highest price of the next day.

For example, the price of a share reaches a high of $30.00 on Wednesday, and opens at $31.20 on Thursday, falls down to $31.00 in the early hour, moves straight up again to $31.45, and no trading occurs in between $30.00 and $31.00 area. This no-trading zone appears on the chart as a gap.

Gaps can play an important role when spotted before the beginning of a move.

== Types of gaps ==
There are four types of gaps, excluding the gap that occurs as a result of a stock going ex-dividend. Each type has its own distinctive implication so it is important to be able to distinguish between them.

- Breakaway gap – occurs when prices break away from an area of congestion. When the price is breaking away from a triangle (Ascending or Descending) with a gap then it can be implied that change in sentiment is strong and coming move will be powerful. One must keep an eye on the volume. If it is heavy after the gap is formed then there is a good chance that market does not return to fill the gap. When the price is breaking away on a low volume, there is a possibility that the gap will be filled before prices resume their trend.
- Common gap – also known as an area gap, pattern gap, or temporary gap, tend to occur when trading is bound between support and resistance level on a short span of time and market price is moving sideways ("where the price trend...has been experiencing neither an uptrend nor a downtrend. Instead, the price activity has been oscillating between a relatively narrow range without forming any distinct trends"). One can also see them in price congestion area. Usually, the price moves back or goes up in order to fill the gaps in the coming days. If the gap is filled, they offer little forecasting significance.
- Exhaustion gap – signals the end of a move. These gaps are associated with a rapid, straight-line advance or decline. A reversal day can easily help to differentiate between the Measuring gap and the Exhaustion gap. When it is formed at the top with heavy volume, there is significant chance that the market is exhausted and prevailing trend is at halt which is ordinarily followed by some other area pattern development. An Exhaustion gap should not be read as a major reversal.
- Measuring Gap – also known as a runaway gap, formed usually in the half way of a price move. It is not associated with the congestion area, it is more likely to occur approximately in the middle of rapid advance or decline. It can be used to measure roughly how much further ahead a move will go. Runaway gaps are not normally filled for a considerable period of time.

== Caution ==
It is quite possible that confusion between measuring gap and exhaustion gap can cause an investor to position himself incorrectly and to miss significant gains during the last half of a major uptrend. Keeping an eye on the volume can help to find the clue between measuring gap and exhaustion gap. Normally, noticeable heavy volume accompanies the arrival of exhaustion gap.

== Trading gaps for profit ==
Some market speculators "Fade" the gap on the opening of a market. This means for example that if the S&P 500 closed the day before at 1150 (16:15 EST) and opens today at 1160 (09:30 EST), they will short the market expecting this "upgap" to close. A "downgap" would mean today opens at, for example, 1140, and the speculator buys the market at the open expecting the "downgap to close". The probability of this happening on any given day is depending on the market. Once the probability of "gap fill" on any given day or technical position is established, then the best setups for this trade can be identified. Some days have such a low probability of the gap filling that speculators will trade in the direction of the gap.

== Examples ==
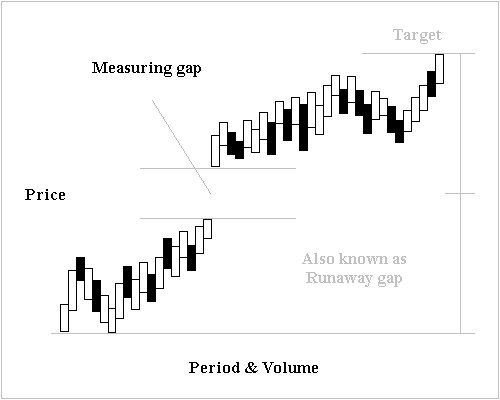
Measuring gap

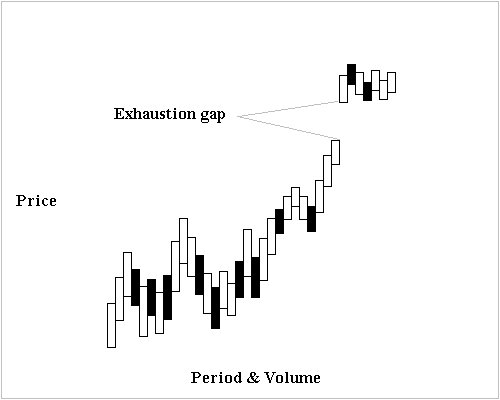
Exhaustion gap

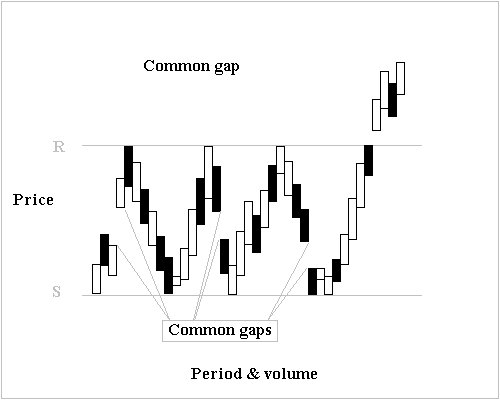
Common gaps

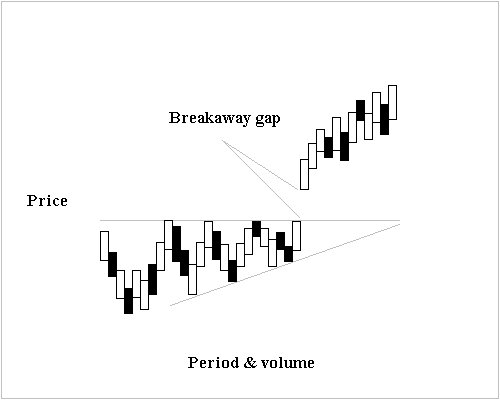
Breakaway gap
