= Honma Munehisa =

Japanese rice merchant (1724–1803)

- 本間 宗久
- Born: 1724
- Died: 1803 (aged 78–79)
- Occupation: Trader
- Known for: Invention of the candlestick chart

Munehisa Honma (本間 宗久, Honma Munehisa) (also known as Sokyu Honma or Sokyu Homma and sometimes called the God of markets; 1724–1803) was a rice merchant from Sakata, Japan who traded in the Dōjima Rice Exchange in Osaka during the Tokugawa Shogunate. He is sometimes considered to be the father of the candlestick chart, a form of technical analysis used in financial markets.

The most famous candlestick trader is the man who invented them, Munehisa Homma. He was a Japanese rice trader who tracked price action and saw patterns developing. He published his work in The Fountain of Gold — The Three Monkey Record of Money in 1755. In today’s dollars, he made about $10 billion.

Around 1710, a futures market emerged for rice, which had previously been traded exclusively on the spot. This system used coupons, promising delivery of rice at a future time. From this, a secondary market of coupon trading emerged in which Munehisa flourished. Stories claim that he established a personal network of men about every 6 km between Sakata and Osaka (a distance of some 600 km) to communicate market prices.

In 1755, he wrote (三猿金泉秘録, San-en Kinsen Hiroku, The Fountain of Gold - The Three Monkey Record of Money), the first book on market psychology. In this, he claims that the psychological aspect of the market is critical to trading success and that traders' emotions significantly influence rice prices. He notes that recognizing this can enable one to take a position against the market: "when all are bearish, there is cause for prices to rise" (and vice versa).

He describes the rotation of Yang (a bull market), and Yin (a bear market) and claims that within each type of market is an instance of the other type. He appears to have used weather, market volume, and price in adopting trading positions.

Some sources claim he wrote two other books (酒田戦術詳解, Sakata Senjyutsu Syokai, A Full Commentary on the Sakata Strategy) and (本間宗久相場三昧伝, Honma Sokyu Soba Zanmai Den, Honma Sokyu --- Tales of a Life Immersed in the Market)
