= Support and resistance =

Economics concept

In stock market technical analysis, support and resistance are certain predetermined levels of the price of a security at which it is thought that the price will tend to stop and reverse. These levels are denoted by multiple touches of price without a breakthrough of the level.

== Support versus resistance ==
A support level is a level where the price tends to find support as it falls due to an increase in demand for the asset. This means that the price is more likely to "bounce" off this level rather than break through it. However, once the price has breached this level, by an amount exceeding some noise, it is likely to continue falling until meeting another support level.

A resistance level is the opposite of a support level. It is where the price tends to find resistance as it rises due to an increase in selling interest. Again, this means that the price is more likely to "bounce" off this level rather than break through it. However, once the price has breached this level, by an amount exceeding some noise, it is likely to continue rising until meeting another resistance level.

A resistance level once broken through or above can develop into a support level. This means that the price will retrace down to the former resistance level and "bounce" off this level.

Traders use support and resistance levels in different chart patterns.

== Reactive versus proactive support and resistance ==
Proactive support and resistance methods are "predictive" in that they often outline areas where price has not actually been. They are based upon current price action that, through analysis, has been shown to be predictive of future price action. Proactive support and resistance methods include Measured Moves, Swing Ratio Projection/Confluence (Static (Square of Nine), Dynamic (Fibonacci)), Calculated Pivots, Volatility Based, Trendlines and Moving averages, VWAP, Market Profile (VAH, VAL and POC).

Reactive support and resistance are the opposite: they are formed directly as a result of price action or volume behaviour. They include Volume Profile, Price Swing lows/highs, Initial Balance, Open Gaps, certain Candle Patterns (e.g. Engulfing, Tweezers) and OHLC.

A price histogram is useful in showing at what price a market has spent more relative time. Psychological levels near round numbers often serve as support and resistance.

== Identifying support and resistance levels ==
Support and resistance levels can be identified by trend lines (technical analysis). Some traders believe in using pivot point calculations.

The more often a support/resistance level is "tested" (touched and bounced off by price), the more significance is given to that specific level.

If a price breaks past a support level, that support level often becomes a new resistance level. The opposite is true as well; if price breaks a resistance level, it will often find support at that level in the future.

Psychological Support and Resistance levels form an important part of a trader's technical analysis. As price reaches a value ending in 50 (ex. 1.2050) or 00 (ex. 1.3000), people often see these levels as a strong potential for interruption in the current movement. The price may hit the line and reverse, it could hover around the level as Bulls and Bears fought for supremacy, or it may punch straight through. A trader should always exercise caution when approaching 00 levels in general, and 50 levels if it has previously acted as Support or Resistance.

== See also ==
- Top (technical analysis)
- Trend line (technical analysis)
- Bottom (technical analysis)
- Price discovery
- Representativeness heuristic
- Fibonacci retracement
