= Chart pattern =

Pattern within a chart when prices are graphed

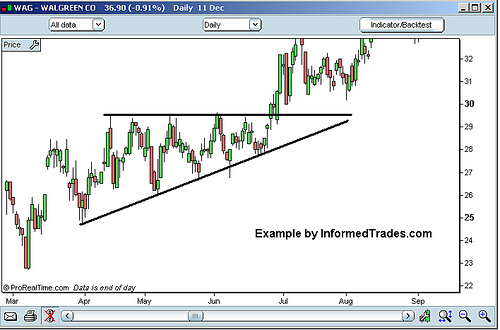
Ascending triangle pattern

A chart pattern or price pattern is a pattern within a chart when prices are graphed. In stock and commodity markets trading, chart pattern studies play a large role during technical analysis. When data is plotted there is usually a pattern which naturally occurs and repeats over a period. Chart patterns are used as either reversal or continuation signals.

Academics have criticized the use of chart patterns and technical analysis in general. In an efficient market, it should not be possible to consistently profit on such patterns.

== Traditional chart pattern ==
Included in this type are the most common chart patterns which have been introduced to chartists for more than a hundred years. Below is a list of the most commonly used traditional chart patterns:

Reversal Patterns:

1. Double Top Reversal
2. Double Bottom Reversal
3. Triple Top Reversal
4. Triple Bottom Reversal
5. Head and Shoulders
6. Key Reversal Bar

Continuation patterns:

1. Triangle
2. Flag and Pennant
3. Channel
4. Cup with Handle

== Harmonic pattern ==
Harmonic Pattern utilizes the recognition of specific structures that possess distinct and consecutive Fibonacci ratio alignments that quantify and validate harmonic patterns. These patterns calculate the Fibonacci aspects of these price structures to identify highly probable reversal points in the financial markets. This methodology assumes that harmonic patterns or cycles, like many patterns and cycles in life, continually repeat. The key is to identify these patterns and to enter or to exit a position based upon a high degree of probability that the same historic price action will occur.

Below is a list of commonly used harmonic patterns:

1. Bat
2. Butterfly
3. Gartley
4. Crab
5. Deep Crab
6. Shark
7. 3 Drives
8. AB=CD
9. 5-0

Traders use the Potential Reversal Zone (PRZ) as an important level of support/resistance in their trading and price action strategy.

== Candlestick pattern ==
In technical analysis, a candlestick pattern is a movement in prices shown graphically on a candlestick chart that some believe can predict a particular market movement. The recognition of the pattern is subjective and programs that are used for charting have to rely on predefined rules to match the pattern. There are 42 recognized patterns that can be split into simple and complex patterns.

Steve Nison is the person who introduced candlesticks to the West.

Below is a list of commonly used candlestick patterns:

1. Engulfing
2. Inside bar
3. Doji
4. Pin bar
5. Morning doji star
6. Evening doji star
7. Tweezer top
8. Tweezer bottom

== See also ==
- Elliot wave
- List of information graphics software
- Market trends
- Price action trading
- Trend following
