= Michael Covel =

American author, entrepreneur (born 1968)

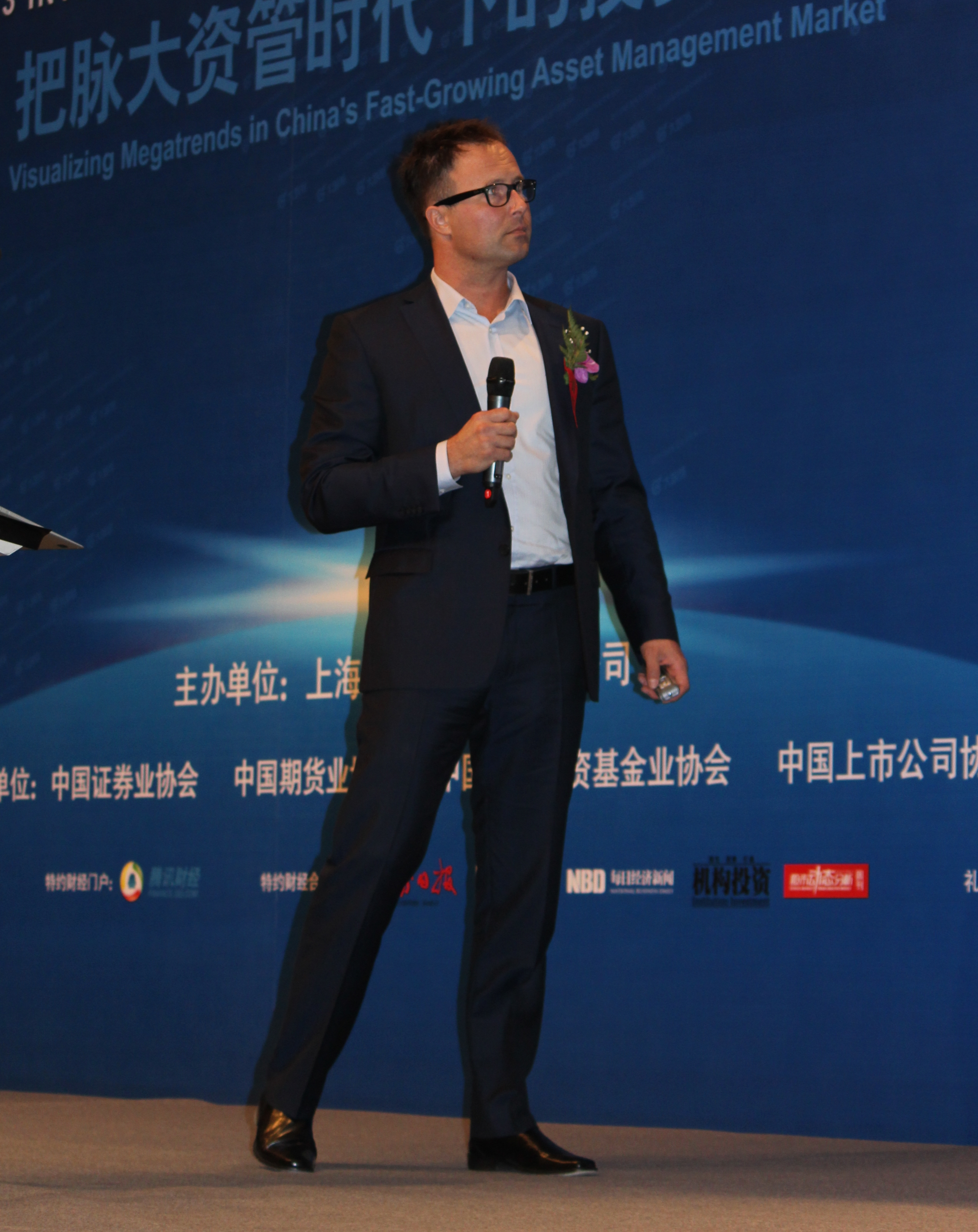
- Born: September 1, 1968 (age 58); Quantico, Virginia, U.S.
- Education: George Mason University; Florida State University
- Notable work: Trend Following; The Complete TurtleTrader; Trend Commandments; The Little Book of Trading
- Website: MichaelCovel.com

Michael W. Covel (born September 1, 1968) is an American author, entrepreneur, and film director. In 1996, he co-founded TurtleTrader.com, later expanded into TrendFollowing.com, a popular online resource focused on investment style known as trend following, which allows investors to profit in both up and down markets.

== Early life ==
Covel was born in Quantico, Virginia. He graduated with a B.A. in Politics and Government from George Mason University and received his M.B.A. from Florida State University.

== Career ==
=== Writing ===
Trend Following

Covel's first book was Trend Following: Learn to Make Millions in Up or Down Markets (FT Press, April 2004, Nov. 2005, Mar. 2007, Mar. 2009) featuring traders David Harding, John W. Henry, Ed Seykota, Richard Donchian, Jesse Lauriston Livermore and Larry Hite, among others. The book analyzes years of detailed performance data to demonstrate that trend following works. The book was an immediate international bestseller, with over 100,000 copies sold to date. It was first published by Financial Times Press on April 23, 2004.

The Complete TurtleTrader

The Complete TurtleTrader: The Legend, the Lessons, the Results (HarperBusiness, October 2007) tells the story of Chicago commodities trader Richard Dennis, along with an oral history of the investment world in the late 20th century. The book reviews an experiment conducted by Dennis and then partner William Eckhardt in 1983 with "the Turtles," a group of novices turned top traders based on Dennis' trading advice. The title refers to a strategy that is based on technical analysis of market prices and is used by traders who aim to ride on market trends. Covel has cited Jack Schwager’s book Market Wizards as partial inspiration for the book.

Other Books

In June 2011, Covel released Trend Commandments: Trading for Exceptional Returns, as a trend following primer for novice traders. In August 2011, Covel released The Little Book of Trading: Trend Following Strategy for Big Winners, which teaches the average person investment practices claimed to beat the market, regardless of the financial climate. Covel's books have been translated into more than 10 languages.

=== Film ===
Broke: The New American Dream

Covel directed the documentary film Broke: The New American Dream, which premiered on Discovery Channel. It covers many economic themes, including the 2008 United States housing bubble, stock-market volatility, and growing economic uncertainty. In the film, Covel interviews financial and economist figures like Harry Markowitz, Vernon L. Smith, Mark Mobius, David Harding, Michael Mauboussin, Larry Hite, Peter Borish, Richard Baker, Barry Ritholtz, Chris Van Hollen, and Eric Bolling. The film criticizes financial news networks like CNBC, stating that they cater to an audience of news junkies in an attempt to score ratings. The film also analyzes behavioral finance, and critiques Americans for not taking personal responsibility for their investment decisions.

== Publishing history ==
=== Books ===
- 2004: Trend Following: How Great Traders Make Millions in Up or Down Markets
- 2005: Trend Following: How Great Traders Make Millions in Up or Down Markets, New Expanded Edition
- 2007: The Complete TurtleTrader: The Legend, the Lessons, the Results
- 2009: Trend Following: Learn to Make Millions in Up or Down Markets, Updated Edition
- 2009: The Complete TurtleTrader: How 23 Novice Investors Became Overnight Millionaires
- 2011: Trend Commandments: Trading for Exceptional Returns
- 2011: The Little Book of Trading: Trend Following Strategy for Big Winners
- 2012: Trend Following Analytics: Performance Proof for the World's Most Controversial and Successful Black Swan Trading Strategy
- 2017: Trend Following: How to Make a Fortune in Bull, Bear and Black Swan Markets, 5th Edition
- 2021: Trend Following Mindset: The Genius of Legendary Trader Tom Basso
- 2023: Trend Following Masters - Volume 1: Trading Conversations
- 2023: Trend Following Masters - Volume 2: Trading Psychology Conversations

=== Films ===
- 2011: Broke: The New American Dream

=== Podcast ===
- 2012-2024: Michael Covel’s Trend Following
