= Commodities Corporation =

US financial services company

- Industry: Investment management
- Founded: 1969
- Founder: Helmut Weymar, Amos Hostetter Sr., and Frank Vannerson
- Defunct: 1997
- Fate: Acquired by Goldman Sachs
- Successor: Goldman Sachs Princeton, Goldman Sachs Hedge Fund Strategies
- Headquarters: Princeton, New Jersey
- Products: Hedge funds
- Parent: Goldman Sachs

Commodities Corporation (frequently referred to as "CC") was a financial services company, based in Princeton, New Jersey, that traded actively across various commodities. The firm was noted as one of the leading commodity and futures trading firms. CC is credited for launching the careers of many notable hedge fund investors and for its influence on global macro investing.

The company was acquired in 1997 and operates as a subsidiary of Goldman Sachs.

== History ==
The company was founded by Helmut Weymar, Frank Vannerson and Amos Hostetter Sr. and with $2.5 million of capital in 1969 from a group of investors that included Nabisco. Weymar, who was a childhood friend of Hostetter's son Amos Jr., had studied commodities at MIT. As a result of his PhD thesis work on cocoa, Weymar took a job, working for Nabisco in 1965. Hostetter had been Weymar's mentor, and began trading stocks and commodities in the 1930s working for Hayden Stone. Hostetter's simple principles for trading are still widely circulated, joined the firm at the age of 67 trading part-time and working to create trading systems to be used by the entire firm.

Among CC's other co-founders were Nobel laureate economist Paul Samuelson, who was also Weymar's thesis advisor, and Paul Cootner, an MIT professor. Vannerson, a colleague of Weymar's from Nabisco who held a Princeton PhD in economics based on a statistical model of wheat prices, developed the computerized trading system from which much of the firm's early profit was derived. He later co-founded Mount Lucas Management in 1986 and served as its chairman until his death in March 2008. CC would bring a large number of PhDs onto its payroll through the 1970s. CC was founded to take advantages of trading opportunities in tradable physical commodities but would later branch out into trading other futures such as currency.

After betting very successfully against the market in 1980, the firm began to receive significant attention. The firm partnered with Paine Webber Jackson & Curtis to launch the Princeton Futures Fund, a $23 million investment fund for US investors in 1981. The company was profiled in Fortune in 1981. The firm was also later featured prominently in the book, Market Wizards, a series of interviews with the world's top traders of the 1980s. The book was written by Jack Schwager of Commodities Corporation. The firm also completed construction of a new headquarters building in Princeton, New Jersey, in 1980.

In 1989, CC sold a 30% interest in the company to ORIX Corporation for $80 million. In 1995, CC acquired an 80% interest in a unit of Crédit Commercial de France.

Commodities Corporation was acquired by Goldman Sachs in 1997 for an undisclosed amount, estimated to be in excess of $100 million. At the time of its acquisition, CC had approximately $1.8 billion in assets under management. The firm was subsequently renamed Goldman Sachs Princeton LLC and served primarily as a fund of funds. Today, the business is known as Goldman Sachs Hedge Fund Strategies and is part of Goldman Sachs Asset Management.

== Notable former employees ==
In addition to its founders, the firm's early co-founders included a number of notable individuals, including

- Paul Samuelson, Nobel laureate economist
- Paul Cootner, professor of finance at the Massachusetts Institute of Technology, noted for his role in the development of the Random walk hypothesis in his 1964 book The Random Character of Stock Market Prices.
- Frank Vannerson, Princeton-trained economist who built the firm's computerized trading system, later co-founder and chairman of Mount Lucas Management

Also, a number of well-known Wall Street traders began their hedge fund careers at Commodities Corporation, including:

- Paul Tudor Jones, founder of Tudor Investment Corporation
- Louis Bacon, founder of Moore Capital Management
- Bruce Kovner, founder of Caxton Associates
- Michael Marcus, a leading commodities and currency trader
- Jack D. Schwager, an author on financial topics and hedge fund manager
- Ed Seykota, a computer scientist, technical trader and pioneer in System Trading
- Marty Schwartz, technical trader, author of "Pit Bull: Lessons from Wall Street's Champion Day Trader", widely regarded as a "trader's trader"!
