= Million Dollar Traders =

- Million Dollar Traders title card
- Genre: Factual, finance
- Created by: Lex van Dam
- Directed by: Anthony Philipson
- Narrated by: Andrew Lincoln
- Composer: Richard Spiller
- Country of origin: United Kingdom
- Original language: English
- No. of series: 1
- No. of episodes: 3 (list of episodes)

Production
- Executive producers: Emma Willis; Ruth Pitt
- Producers: Rob Miller; Anthony Philipson
- Production location: London
- Editors: Rupert Houseman; Alex Muggleton
- Running time: 1 hour
- Production company: Century Films

Original release
- Network: BBC Two
- Release: 12 January – 27 January 2009

Million Dollar Traders is a 2009 British reality television series devised by hedge fund manager Lex van Dam, which attempted to recreate the famous Turtle Traders experiment devised by Richard Dennis in the 1980s.

== Background ==
Million Dollar Traders follows a group of twelve wannabe traders dealing in shares during the 2008 financial crisis, which was then whittled down to the final eight. The contestants come from various backgrounds, including a fight promoter, a day trader, an IT/banking recruitment consultant, a working mother, a retired IT engineer and a student, among others. During the series van Dam gave the London-based contestants the sterling equivalent of $1 million of his own money to trade for 2 months. Former professional trader Anton Kreil was appointed as the manager of the group.

As with the original experiment, those who lasted the course broadly confirmed the claim that novices could become professional-level traders, making small profits or at least lower losses trading in very turbulent markets during the filming than professionals, who lost four times greater amounts over the same period. The three-part BBC series, narrated by Andrew Lincoln, was a part of the "City Season" programming on the BBC. It aired on BBC 2 in the UK at 9pm on Monday evenings between 12 and 27 January 2009.

== Episode list ==
Episode number	Title	Content	Original airdate
1	"Make Me a Trader"	The contestants are introduced to the trading floor and begin to build their portfolios – one contestant leaves.	12 January 2009
2	"Profit and Loss"	Each member of the team becomes a little more comfortable in trading, while one contestant leaves.	19 January 2009
3	"People vs Profit"	A number of the contestants leave due to disliking the working conditions, Lex hands out the remainder of his money and the remaining contestants find out how they have performed.	27 January 2009

== Contestants ==
Name	Occupation
Mike Tovell	Soldier
Amit Jobanputra	Shopkeeper
Simon Brew	IT Engineer
Cleo Folkes	Former Vet
Emile Coleman	Fight promoter
Caroline Taysom	Entrepreneur/Single Mother
Ohioma Imoukhuede	Student
Sam Duby	Environmentalist
Michael (final 12)	IT/Banking Recruiter
Paul (final 12)	Day Trader
Unknown (final 12)	Car Trader (quit on day 1)
Unknown (final 12)	Recruitment Consultant
