= Lex van Dam =

Dutch investment manager, investor and writer (born 1968)

Lex van Dam (born Drachten, Netherlands in June 1968) is a Dutch investment manager, investor, and writer specialising in trading in equities, currencies and financial derivatives. He lives in London.

Born in a small town in Friesland, van Dam studied econometrics and investments at the University of Groningen. His professional career began in 1992, trading stocks for Goldman Sachs where he worked for ten years, latterly as head of the equities proprietary trading desk. After that he ran money at GLG which, at the time, was Europe's largest hedge fund. Since 2007 he has been a hedge fund manager at Hampstead Capital LLP, London.

In 2009, van Dam featured in a three-part series on BBC2, entitled Million Dollar Traders that aimed to educate eight ordinary people about the stock market, in a re-creation of the famous "turtle trader" experiment of Richard Dennis in the 1980s. Van Dam put up the sterling equivalent of $1 million of his own money for the novices to trade with over the course of eight weeks. As with the original experiment, those who lasted the course broadly confirmed the claim that novices could become professional-level traders, making small profits or at least lower losses trading in very turbulent markets during the filming than professionals, who lost four times greater amounts over the same period. Van Dam set up the experiment to encourage the public to take greater control of their personal finances during the 2008 financial crisis.

Later that year, a companion book How to Make Money Trading was released in order to expand on the trading techniques featured in the television series.

In November 2010, he launched The Lex van Dam Trading Academy which aims to teach people how to trade and invest in the stock market based on his 5-Step-Trading® methodology.

Together with David Winner he translated a book about the football player Johan Cruyff, entitled Ajax, Barcelona, Cruyff, The ABC Of An Obstinate Maestro by Frits Barend and Henk van Dorp.
