= Hite (surname) =

Hite is a surname. Notable people with the surname include:

- Bob Hite (1943–1981), American singer
- Bob Hite (announcer) (1914–2000), American announcer
- Carl Hite, President of Cleveland State Community College
- Charles J. Hite (1876–1914), American businessman and film producer
- Cliff Hite (born 1954), American politician
- David Hite (1923–2004), American clarinetist
- Henry Hite (1915–1978), American spokesperson better known as the "Corn King Giant"
- Jacob Hite (1719-1776), American land speculator known for his assault on the Martinsburg Jail
- Kathleen Hite (1917–1989), American scriptwriter
- Kenneth Hite (born 1965), writer and role-playing game designer
- Larry Hite, hedge fund manager and pioneer of systems trading
- Les Hite (1903–1962), American jazz bandleader
- Mabel Hite (1883–1912), American comedian and actress
- Michael Hite (born 1966), American politician
- Richard Hite, Lieutenant Colonel of the Baltimore Police Department
- Robert Hite (artist) (1956–2020), American visual artist
- Robert Hite (born 1984), American basketball player
- Robert L. Hite (1920–2015), World War II pilot and prisoner of war
- Shere Hite (1942–2020), German sex educator and feminist
- Wood Hite (c. 1850–1881), American outlaw and cousin of Frank and Jesse James
