= Fara Warner =

American journalist and author

Fara Warner is an American author, journalist and speaker who reports on marketing and consumer trends. Warner has held executive positions at Dow Jones & Company and The Wall Street Journal where she was known for her role in creating branded content and revenue opportunities. She is co-founder of A Picture's Worth, a journalism start-up, and is a leadership ambassador with Take The Lead, a nonprofit concerned with women's advancement. Since November 20, 2023, she has been executive director of the University of Rhode Island's Metcalf Institute, which supports environmental journalism.

== Early life ==
Warner attended the University of Utah, where she was on staff at The Daily Utah Chronicle, the independent student paper, from 1984 to 1988. Warner earned a master's degree in journalism at Columbia University in New York.

== Career ==
In her early career, Warner was a freelance journalist who contributed to Mother Jones, The New York Times, and The Daily Beast. She was the Communications Manager of Ford Motor Company in 2002.

Warner was the editorial director of AOL Tech and This Built America, which featured companies in each of the United States over 50 weeks. At The Wall Street Journal, Warner was Global Content Director where she won the Cannes Lion for the Cocainenomics branded content series she developed to help promote the first season of Narcos on Netflix. While Vice President, Custom Content, at Dow Jones, The Drum included Warner on its list of "the world's most creative women."

Warner was a featured speaker for the second annual Women in Business Luncheon on December 5, 2006 and was on the board of G23, the Omnicorp Group consultancy group for reaching women consumers. She was also a Howard R Marsh Visiting Professor of Journalism and Professor of Communication Studies at the University of Michigan. In 2011, Warner was the keynote speaker for the Purse Power seminar which took place at the Mansion House in Dublin, Ireland. In 2016, Warner was a judge for the Craig Newmark Graduate School of Journalism and City College of New York’s Branded and Integrated Communication Program “Journalism in the Age of Branded Content...and Vice Versa” event.

Warner and Elissa Yancey led the 2018-2019 Poynter College Media Project at the Poynter Institute, which provided free newsroom training and online seminars for nine student media organizations. Warner was also an industry expert trainer in 2019 for the Take The Lead “50 Women Can Change the World in Journalism” program.

Warner's 2005 book, The Power of the Purse, chronicled the power of women in business.

== Works ==
- The Power of the Purse: How Smart Businesses Are Adapting to the World’s Most Important Consumers - Women. FT Press, 2005.
