= Ed Seykota =

American commodities trader (born 1946)

Edward Seykota
- Born: August 7, 1946 (age 80)
- Occupation: Capital Allocation

Edward Arthur Seykota (born August 7, 1946) is an American commodities trader, who earned B.S. degrees in Electrical Engineering from MIT and Management from the MIT Sloan School of Management, both in 1969. In 1970, Seykota pioneered systems trading by using early punched card computers to test market trading ideas. Seykota resided in Incline Village, Nevada, on the north shore of Lake Tahoe, but moved to Texas.

== Career ==
As a young man he attended high school near The Hague, Netherlands and also lived in Voorburg.

In 1970, he pioneered a computerized trading system (now known as Trading System) for the futures market for the brokerage house he and Michael Marcus worked for. Later, he decided to venture out independently and manage a few of his clients' accounts.

Much of Seykota's success was attributed to his development and utilization of computerized trading systems, which he first tested on a mainframe IBM computer. Later, the brokerage house he had been working for adopted his system for their trades.

His interest in creating a computerized system grew after he read a letter by Richard Donchian on utilizing mechanical trend-following systems for trading and Donchian's 5- and 20-day moving average systems. Reminiscences of a Stock Operator by Edwin Lefèvre also inspired Seykota. Seykota based his first trading system on exponential moving averages.

Ed Seykota, Market Wizards

Systems don't need to be changed. The trick is for a trader to develop a system with which he is compatible.

Seykota improved this system over time, adapting it to fit his trading style and preferences. Although the initial version of the system was rigid, he later introduced more rules, pattern triggers, and money management algorithms.

Another aspect of his success was his genuine love for trading and his optimistic demeanor. These factors sustained his efforts to continuously improve his system, although he never changed the system's response indicators and instead fine-tuned market stimuli.

== The Trading Tribe ==
In 1992, Seykota gathered a group of traders to discuss their emotions due to his concern that traders often allow their emotions to overrule their logic. They start gathering regularly, and Seykota develops methods to support personal growth. Over the years, it expands to include Tribes all over the world and people in many professions. Members help to develop a standard set of practices Seykota calls TTP, the Trading Tribe Process. He describes these ideas and practices in his book The Trading Tribe (2005) and its refinement in an online article called TTP Extensions: Replacing the Zero-Point Process with the Rocks Process (2013).

== Books ==
- The Trading Tribe (2005)
- Govopoly in the 39th Day (2013)

== Influence ==
In Market Wizards, Updated: Interviews With Top Traders, author Jack D. Schwager devotes a chapter to Seykota and writes that his "achievements must certainly rank him as one of the best traders of our time."
