= Hite =

Hite or HITE may refer to:

- HiteJinro, a South Korean brewery
  - Hite Brewery
- Hite (surname)
- Hite, California, former name of Hite Cove, California
- Hite, Utah, a ghost town
- HITE, an industrial estate in Pakistan

== See also ==
- Hite v. Fairfax, Virginia Supreme Court case
