= Richard Pearis =

American pioneer (1725–1794)

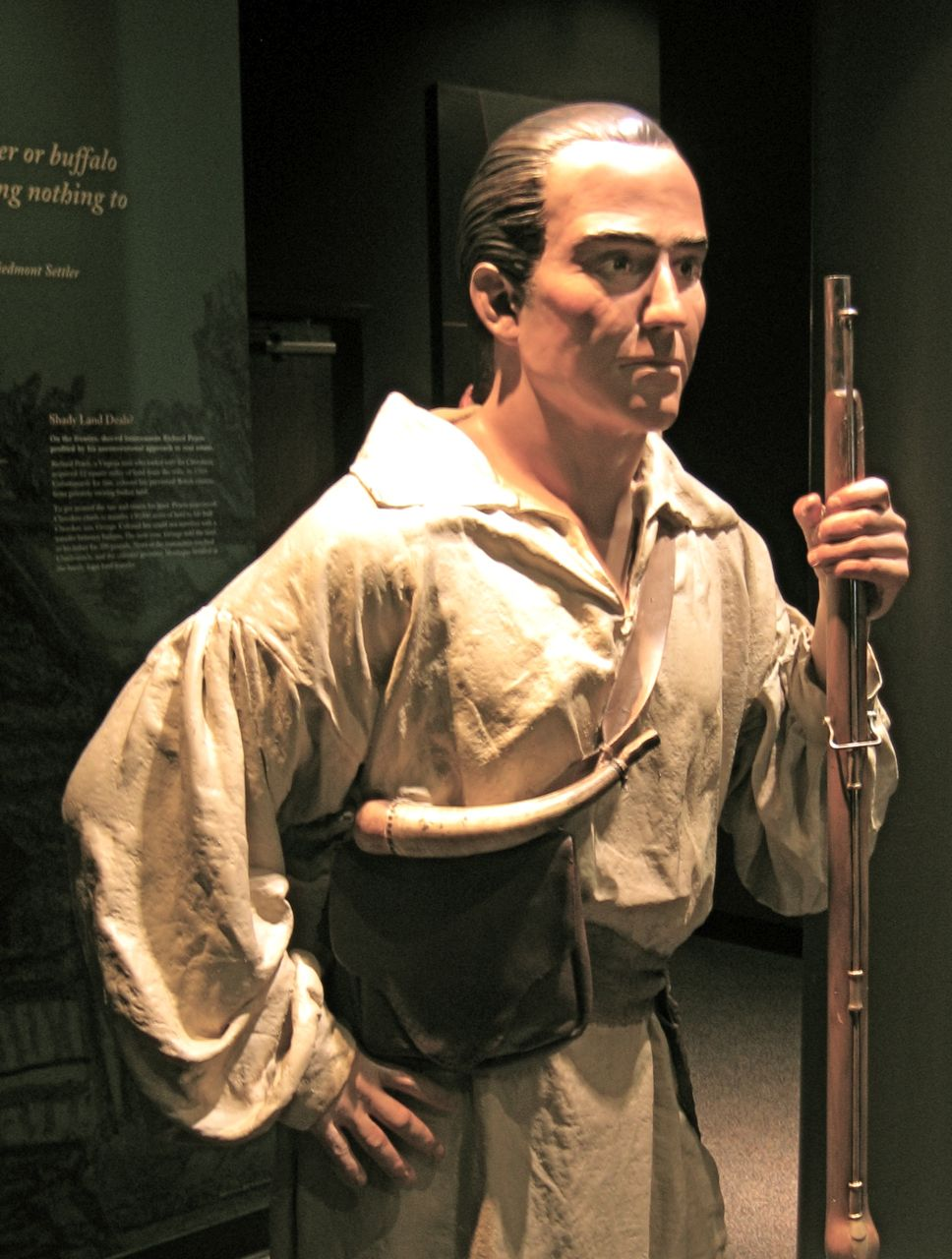
- Life-size representation of Richard Pearis, at the Upcountry History Museum in Greenville, South Carolina
- Born: 1725; Ireland, United Kingdom, British Empire
- Died: 1794 (aged 69); Bahamas, British North America, British Empire
- Resting place: Bahamas
- Occupations: trader, Indian agent, planter, soldier
- Spouse: Cherokee woman
- Military career
- Allegiance: Kingdom of Great Britain
- Branch: British Army
- Service years: 1756-1763, 1775-1776
- Rank: Captain
- Conflicts: French and Indian War; American Revolutionary War

Richard Pearis (1725–1794) was a pioneer settler of Upstate South Carolina and a Loyalist officer during the American Revolution.

== Early life ==
Richard Pearis was born in Ireland in 1725, the son of George and Sarah Pearis, who were Presbyterians of considerable affluence. The family immigrated to the Shenandoah Valley of Virginia when Richard was ten, and by 1750, Richard owned 1,200 acres (4.9 km^{2}) of land near Winchester, where he lived with his wife Rhoda and three children.

== Career ==
By 1753, Pearis was trading with the Cherokee Nation; and in partnership with Nathaniel Gist, he opened a trading post near present Kingsport, Tennessee. During the mid-1750s Pearis also began trading with the Cherokee in South Carolina and fathered a son, George, by a Cherokee woman. "An orator of rude, savage eloquence and power," Pearis gained favor with Virginia governor Robert Dinwiddie; and during the French and Indian War, Pearis led a company of Cherokee warriors on the Sandy Creek Expedition in 1756 and served under British General John Forbes when he captured Fort Duquesne in 1758. At the conclusion of the war, Pearis became Indian agent for colonial Maryland.

In 1770, Pearis and another member of the frontier gentry, Jacob Hite, forged letters from Cherokee leaders, including Oconostota, declaring the Indians' willingness to cede land to the colony of Virginia. Pearis also claimed a deed from the Cherokee of twelve square miles in the area that is now Greenville County, South Carolina. An Indian interpreter, one John Watts, wrote the British Indian superintendent, John Stuart, that Pearis was "a very dangerous fellow who will breed great disturbances if he is let alone, for he will tell the Indians any lies to please them."

With the help of an Indian ally, Saluy, Pearis secured approval of his land grant from the chiefs at Chota, apparently in exchange for the cancellation of their trading debts. But in 1772, Stuart complained to the governor of South Carolina that Pearis had gained his title by plying the Indians with liquor. The governor then urged Stuart to prosecute Pearis for violating a 1739 statute that forbade British citizens to own Indian land. Meanwhile, Pearis had begun to transfer the land to other whites.

In November 1773, the circuit court at Ninety Six found Pearis guilty of holding Indian land, and he surrendered his deed. But the following month he secured another deed from Cherokee leaders granting his son George more than twelve square miles of land—most of which George then conveniently transferred to his father.

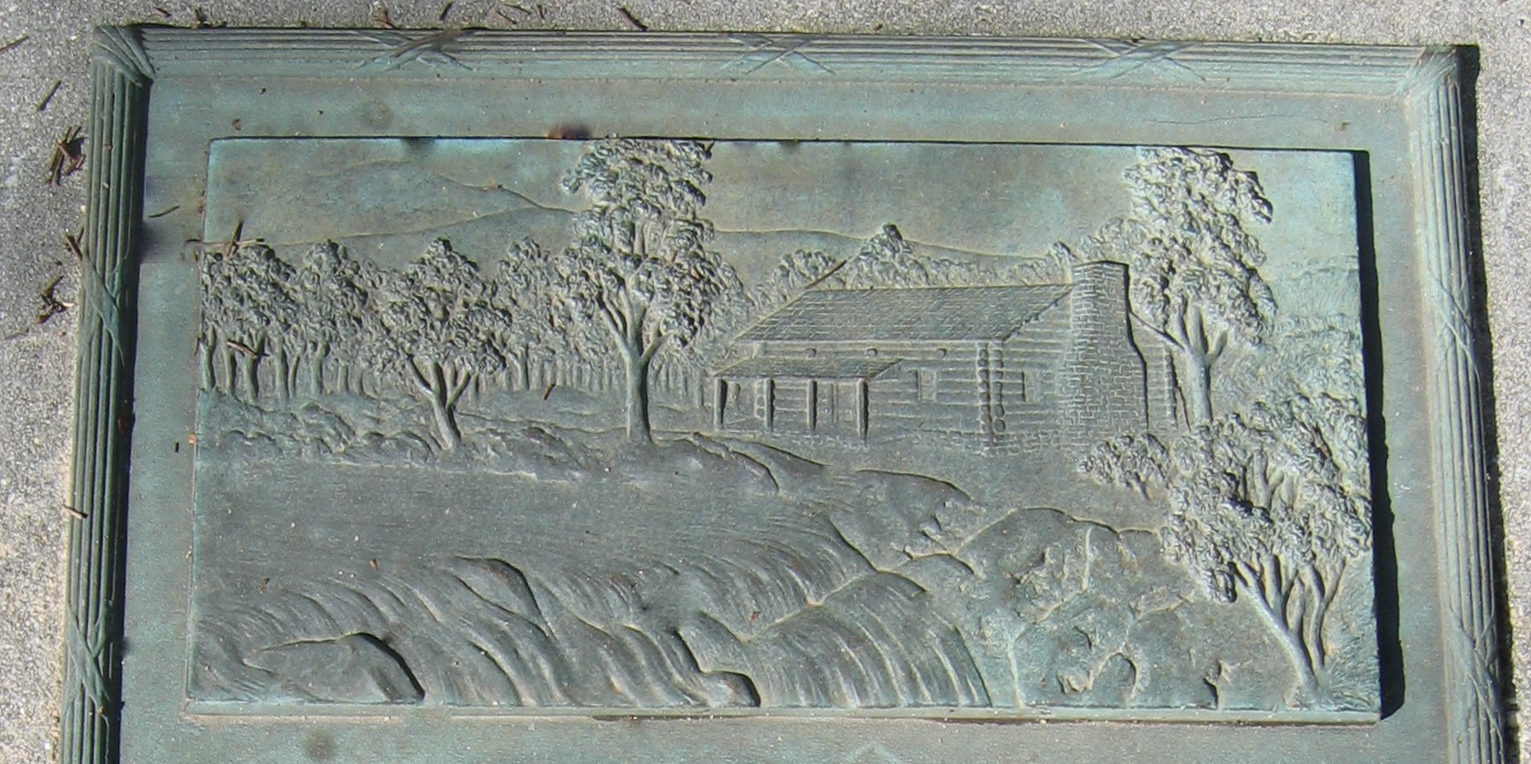
Mid-twentieth century representation of Pearis's Greenville plantation, "Great Plains," from a historical marker near the Reedy River

Sometime after 1770, Pearis, his family, and their twelve slaves began to clear 100 acres (400,000 m^{2}) of land near the falls of the Reedy River, at the heart of modern Greenville, South Carolina, where they planted grain and orchards on a plantation Pearis called "Great Plains." Pearis built "a substantial house" and a store as well as a grist and sawmill.

In 1775, Pearis sought an appointment as a patriot commissioner to the Indians, and after the post was given to another, Pearis became a Tory captain. On 12 December 1775, patriot Colonel Richard Richardson captured Pearis and eight other Tory leaders. Pearis was kept in irons at Charleston for nine months, after which he made his way to British West Florida. Pearis's house and plantation buildings were burned by Pearis's backcountry opponents in July 1776.

Pearis continued to serve with Loyalist forces during the American Revolution during what amounted to a civil war along the frontier. After the fall of Augusta, Georgia to the patriots in June 1781, Pearis was captured, and General Andrew Pickens saved Pearis's life "by putting him in a boat and sending him down river, away from the angry soldiers who would have killed him." Pearis's land was confiscated by the state of South Carolina, and Pearis spent his remaining years as a planter in the Bahamas. He was more than amply compensated by the British government for South Carolina lands that, arguably, he had never legally owned.

North of contemporary Greenville, the locally prominent Paris Mountain and its Paris Mountain State Park take their name from Richard Pearis.
