= Caxton Associates =

London-based hedge fund

- Industry: Investment management
- Founded: 1983
- Headquarters: Berkeley Square, London
- Area served: Worldwide
- Key people: Andrew Law (CEO & Chairman)
- Products: Hedge funds
- AUM: $12 billion (2021)
- Number of employees: 350 (2021)
- Website: www.caxton.com

Caxton Associates is a global macro hedge fund founded by Bruce Kovner in 1983 in New York City. The firm's headquarters are located in London, and also has offices in New York, Singapore, Monaco and Dubai. Caxton Associates identifies investments according to their research of global markets and analysis of worldwide economic trends.

Caxton Associates went through a major generational transition in 2008 when Bruce Kovner stepped back from trading and appointed Andrew Law as Chief Investment Officer. In 2011, Law was appointed as the Chairman, CEO and controlling general partner of Caxton Associates, following the retirement of Kovner. The firm manages $12 billion in assets.

== History ==
Caxton was founded in 1983 by Bruce Kovner. Kovner trained under Michael Marcus at Commodities Corporation (now part of Goldman Sachs International), before embarking on his own with the founding of Caxton.

In 1992, Caxton closed its fund to new investors. The fund then opened and closed intermittently, and most recently reopened to new investors in August 2013.

It was reported that at the end of the 1990s Caxton Global Investments volatility fell substantially along with the funds returns.

In 2003 concern at Caxton Associates around the potential future impact on their historical rate of return due to their fund's size resulted in 20 percent of investors' capital being returned. Assets under management post 20% were $9.5 billion.

On December 21, 2007, Caxton-Iseman Capital, a joint investment partnership Caxton Associates and Frederick Iseman announced that it had completed its spin-off from Caxton Associates. Caxton-Iseman Capital will change its name to CI Capital Partners LLC.

In 2008, Bruce Kovner stepped back from trading and appointed Andrew Law as Caxton’s Chief Investment Officer. In 2011, Law was appointed as the Chairman, CEO and controlling general partner of Caxton Associates, following the retirement of Kovner. Law joined the London office in 2003 from Goldman Sachs, where he was Managing Director and head of FICC proprietary trading in London.

During the 2008 financial crisis Caxton Associates did not erect gates freezing investor capital in their Caxton Global Investments fund. As reported the fund saw client redemptions totalling 27% of assets under management through 2008–2009—while returning 13% for the year. The redemptions were reportedly born out of cash strapped clients many of whose asset allocations were gated and frozen at other investment management companies: two years later the firm had fallen from No. 16 to No. 51.

In 2010 it was reported that since 1983 Caxton Associates had returned $12.8 billion to clients whilst managing $6 billion; ranking second amongst managers who have returned more than they currently manage.

In 2020, Caxton announced they were shutting their main hedge fund to new money after it made a record 40% gain during the coronavirus pandemic.

== Company ==
Caxton Associates' offices are in New York, London's Mayfair district, Singapore, Monaco and Dubai. In July 2019 it was reported its London office was now its headquarters.

== Investments ==
Caxton Associates is a global macro hedge fund and has made more than $13bn for its clients - according to LCH Investments - this is roughly 14 per cent annually, with half the volatility of the S&P 500.

According to an interview with Andrew Law in the Financial Times in October 2013, Caxton has “three core principles”: “One is listen to the markets, a second one is politics and policy matters and the third one is risk control.”

=== Investment vehicles ===
The firm's flagship fund was reported in August 2011 to account for $7 billion of Caxton Associates assets under management.
