= Bruce Kovner =

American billionaire

- Born: February 1945 (age 81); New York City, U.S.
- Education: Harvard University
- Occupation: Hedge fund manager
- Known for: Founder, Caxton Associates
- Spouse(s): Sarah Peter (divorced); Suzie Fairchild
- Children: 3 (including Rachel)

Bruce Stanley Kovner (born February 1945) is an American billionaire hedge fund manager and philanthropist. He is chairman of CAM Capital, which he established in January 2012 to manage his investment, trading and business activities. From 1983 through 2011, Kovner was founder and chairman of Caxton Associates, a diversified trading company. As of April 2024, his net worth was estimated at US$7.7 billion.

Kovner is chairman of the Juilliard School and was vice chairman of Lincoln Center for the Performing Arts. He is on the boards of the Metropolitan Opera, Lincoln Center, and American Enterprise Institute.

== Early life ==
Bruce Stanley Kovner was born in February 1945 in New York City's Brooklyn borough to Jewish parents Isidore Kovner, an engineer who briefly played semi-professional football, and his wife, Sophie. Kovner spent his early years in the Borough Park section of Brooklyn with his parents and three siblings before the family relocated to suburban Los Angeles in 1953. Early on, he was a high achiever, becoming a Merit Scholar. He was the student-body president of Van Nuys High School at 16, and an accomplished basketball player and pianist.

Kovner went to Harvard College starting in 1962, a time marred by the hanging suicide of his mother back in his family's Van Nuys home in 1965. Nonetheless, he was considered a good student and well liked by classmates. Kovner stayed at Harvard, studying political economy at the John F. Kennedy School of Government.

Kovner did not finish his Ph.D., but continued his studies until 1970. Over the next few years, he engaged in a number of eclectic efforts; he worked on political campaigns, studied the harpsichord, was a writer, and a cab driver. It was during the latter occupation, not long after his marriage to now ex-wife Sarah Peter, that he discovered commodities trading.

== Investment career ==
Kovner's first trade was in 1977 for $3,000, borrowed against his MasterCard, in soybean futures contracts. Realizing growth to $40,000, he then watched the contract drop to $23,000 before selling. He later claimed that this first, nerve-racking trade taught him the importance of risk management.

In his eventual role as a trader under Michael Marcus at Commodities Corporation (now part of Goldman Sachs), he purportedly made millions and gained widespread respect as an objective and sober trader. This ultimately led to the establishment of Caxton Associates, in 1983, which at its peak managed over $14 billion in capital and has been closed to new investors since 1992. Kovner was a director of Synta Pharmaceuticals from 2002 to 2016.

In September 2011, Kovner announced his retirement from his position as CEO at Caxton, succeeded by Andrew Law.

Kovner established CAM Capital in January 2012 to manage his investment, trading, and business activities.

== Philanthropy and political donations ==
Kovner established The Kovner Foundation in 1996 to support organizations that promote excellence in the arts and education, initiatives that defend private enterprise and protect individual rights, and scholarly studies and research that strengthen American democratic principles.

A long-time supporter of The Juilliard School, Kovner has been chairman of the School's board since 2001. In 2013 Bruce and his wife, Suzie Kovner, endowed the Kovner Fellowship Program at Juilliard with a gift of $60 million - the largest one-time gift to the school. In 2012 Kovner donated $20 million to Juilliard to endow the school's graduate program in historical performance. Kovner also donated a collection of music manuscripts to Juilliard in 2006. Kovner is vice chairman of Lincoln Center for the performing arts as well as a major funder of the redevelopment of Lincoln Center. He is also managing director of the Metropolitan Opera's board of directors. Kovner founded and was chairman of the School Choice Scholarships Foundation, which awarded scholarships to financially disadvantaged youth in New York City. He has actively supported other charter schools, such as the Success Academy Charter Schools, where his wife Suzie serves on the board.

Kovner has contributed extensively to conservative causes. In January 2012 he donated around $500,000 to Restore our Future, a Super PAC supporting the presidential campaign of Mitt Romney. He is the former chairman of the board of trustees of the American Enterprise Institute. His close acquaintances have included former Vice President Dick Cheney, neoconservative figures Richard Perle and James Q. Wilson. Previously, he was a backer of the conservative Manhattan Institute and had invested in The New York Sun daily newspaper. A paper by Robert Brulle noted that his foundation funded conservative organizations that may have been involved in conservative climate change studies from 2003 to 2010. The paper was criticized in The Guardian since the majority of organizations in the study have multiple focuses, and Brulle could not say what portion of money (if any) was devoted to climate issues.

Other philanthropic causes he has supported include the Institute for Justice, a public interest law firm that focuses on school choice; the Innocence Project and Centurion Ministries, which help serve wrongly-convicted inmates, and Lambda Legal, which advocates for equality and civil rights for the LGBTQ community.

== Personal life ==
Kovner has three children—including Rachel Kovner, a federal district judge in Brooklyn—and has been married twice. In 1973, at age 28, he married artist Sarah Peter, in a Jewish ceremony in Connecticut. They divorced in 1998. In 2007, he married Suzie Fairchild, the daughter of Robert Fairchild, and great-granddaughter of Louis Fairchild who founded the company with his brother, Edmund Fairchild, that became Fairchild Fashion Media, now a division of Condé Nast Publications.

His Fifth Avenue mansion in New York City, the Willard D. Straight House, features a lead-lined room to protect against a chemical, biological, or dirty bomb attack.

== Legacy and awards ==
In 2008, he was inducted into the Institutional Investor's Alpha's Hedge Fund Manager Hall of Fame.

Kovner is a fellow of the American Academy of Arts and Sciences and received an honorary doctorate from The Juilliard School. In 2016 he was awarded the William E. Simon Prize for Philanthropic Leadership by the Philanthropy Roundtable and the Alexander Hamilton Award by the Manhattan Institute.

== See also ==
- List of Harvard University people
