= Paris Mountain State Park =

State park in South Carolina, United States

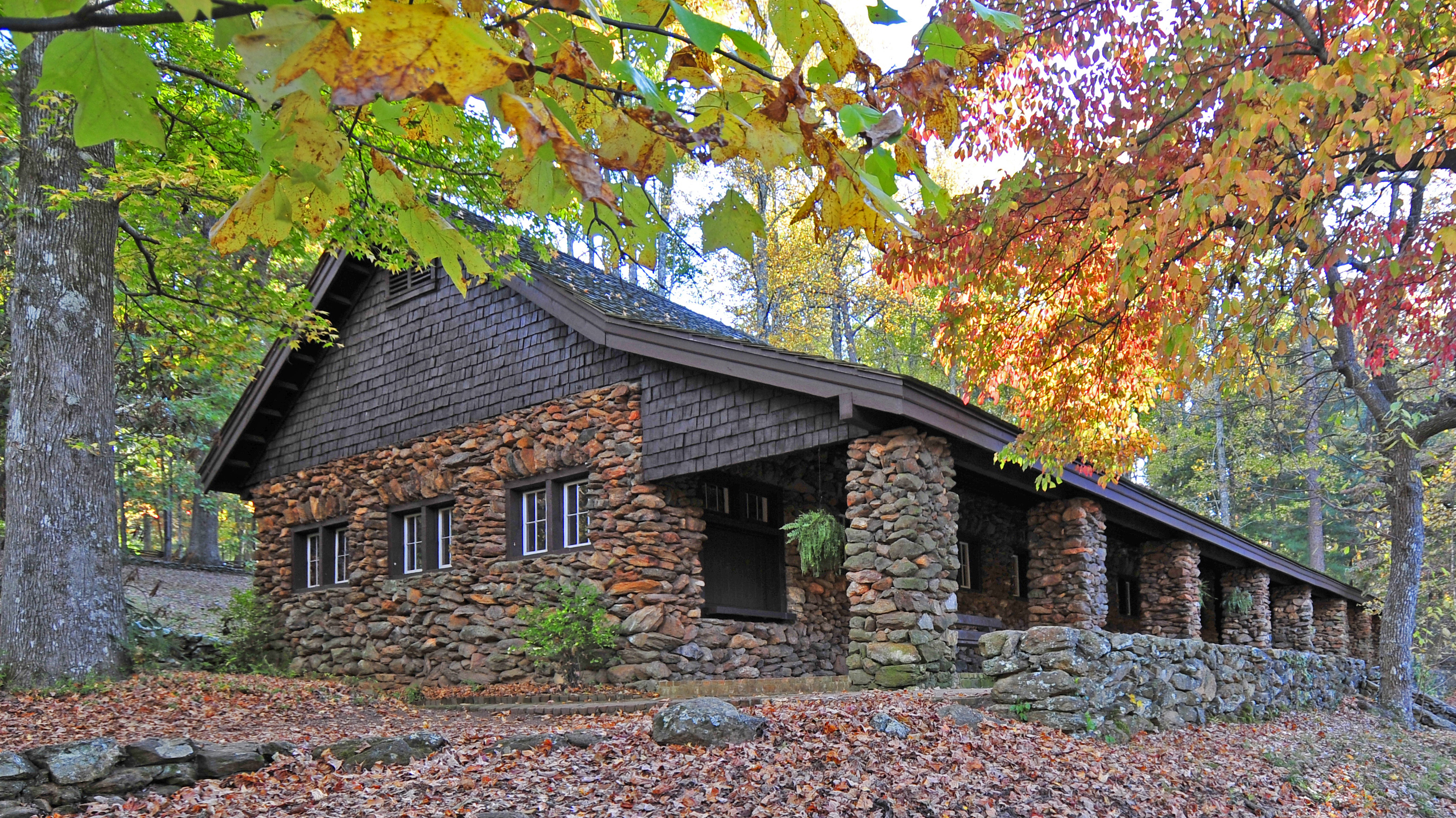
- Bath house at Paris Mountain State Park
- Interactive map of Paris Mountain State Park
- Location: 2401 State Park Road, Greenville, South Carolina
- Coordinates: 34°55′32″N 82°21′56″W
- Area: 1,540 acres (6 km^{2})
- Elevation: 2,000 feet (609.6 m)
- Created: 1935
- Camp sites: 39 standard sites, 5 primitive sites
- Hiking trails: Sassafras, Brissy Ridge Loop, Sulphur Springs Loop, Fire Tower Trail, Kanuga Trail,Turtle Trail, Lake Placid Trail, North Lake Trail
- Other information: 14 miles (23 km) of hiking trails
- Paris Mountain State Park Historic District
- U.S. National Register of Historic Places
- U.S. Historic district
- Area: 1,275 acres (516.0 ha)
- Built: 1937
- Built by: Civilian Conservation Corps; U.S. Forest Service
- Architectural style: Late 19th and early 20th century American movements, rustic style
- MPS: South Carolina State Parks MPS
- NRHP reference No.: 98000416
- Added to NRHP: April 30, 1998

Paris Mountain State Park is a state park in the U.S. state of South Carolina, located five miles (8 km) north of Greenville. Activities available in the 1,540-acre (6 km^{2}) park include hiking, biking, swimming and picnicking. The 13-acre (52,609 m^{2}) Lake Placid offers swimming and fishing. Canoes, kayaks, and pedal boats are seasonally available for rental; private boats are not permitted. Camping is allowed and campsites range from rustic, back country sites to paved sites with water and electricity hook-ups. The park's Civilian Conservation Corps (CCC) structures, including the Camp Buckhorn lodge, are listed on the National Register of Historic Places.

== History ==
Cherokee Indians once dwelled on Paris Mountain, before European men began to colonize North America. The first white man settled in what is now known as Greenville County in 1765. He was a Scots-Irish man from Virginia named Richard Pearis. He married a Cherokee woman and became close to the Cherokee tribe. The Indians continually gave Pearis land until his property extended 10 square miles (26 km^{2}). Richard Pearis is the source of the name "Paris" Mountain. In 1775, a letter from the superintendent of Indian affairs, Jonathan Stuart was written to the Cherokee Indians chastening the Indians for selling their lands to white men. In one part of the letter, Stuart writes, "You are constantly listening to Richard Pearis, who cheats you of your lands." Some of the land which Richard Pearis possessed contained the mountain known today as Paris Mountain. Therefore, the name "Paris" is a construed form of "Pearis". A legend surrounding the mountain speaks of the first white men to visit the mountain. The chief of the indwelling Cherokee tribe tried to protect the mountain, and when he grew old, he passed on the responsibility to his daughter and her husband. The husband failed in this task and sold the mountain; in anger, the daughter of the chief killed her husband.

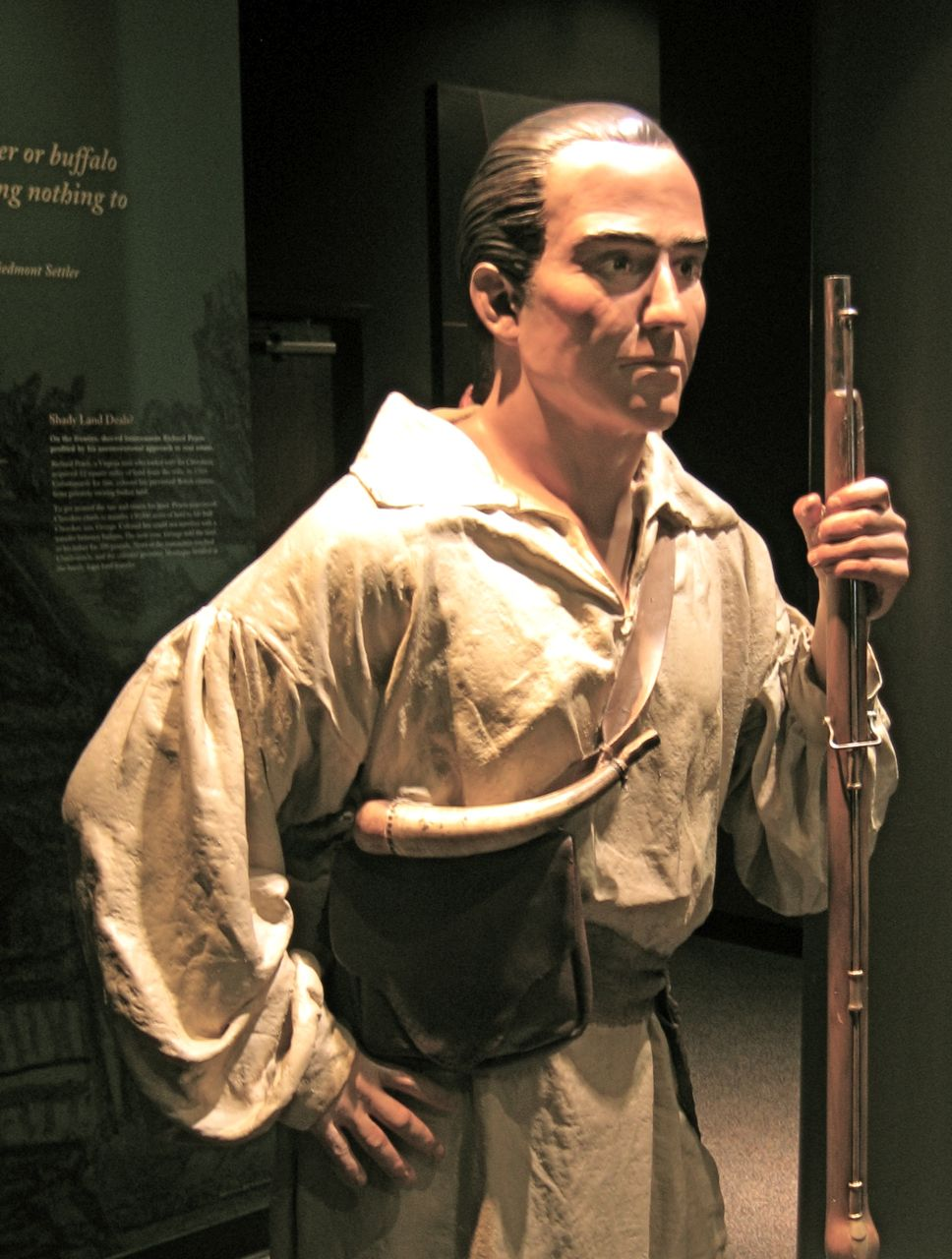
Life-sized representation of Richard Pearis at the Upcountry History Museum, Greenville, South Carolina

One of the earliest uses of the mountain by the city of Greenville was as a source of water between 1890 and 1916. Numerous lakes and dams in the park were built in 1890 by the Greenville City Water System as part of the reservoir. In 1928 Table Rock Reservoir was put into service, and the use of Paris Mountain as a water supply declined.

The mountain also had other uses. In the 1890s, a popular resort resided on Paris Mountain named Altamont Hotel. However, the resort failed and was sold to N. J. Holmes, who in turn, founded a Bible institute on the site. The institute was first known as Altamont Bible and Missionary Institute and later as Holmes Bible College. The college opened its doors in 1898. The institute was later sold to another citizen, and the building later suffered a fire in 1920.

The state park on Paris Mountain was built in the 1930s by the Depression-era Civilian Conservation Corps (CCC). Sixteen other parks in the state of South Carolina were also created due to the work of the CCC. The land for the park was acquired in 1935 from the city of Greenville.

The nearby liberal arts college, Furman University, founded in 1826, is located near the foot of the mountain for which the park is named.

== Geography ==
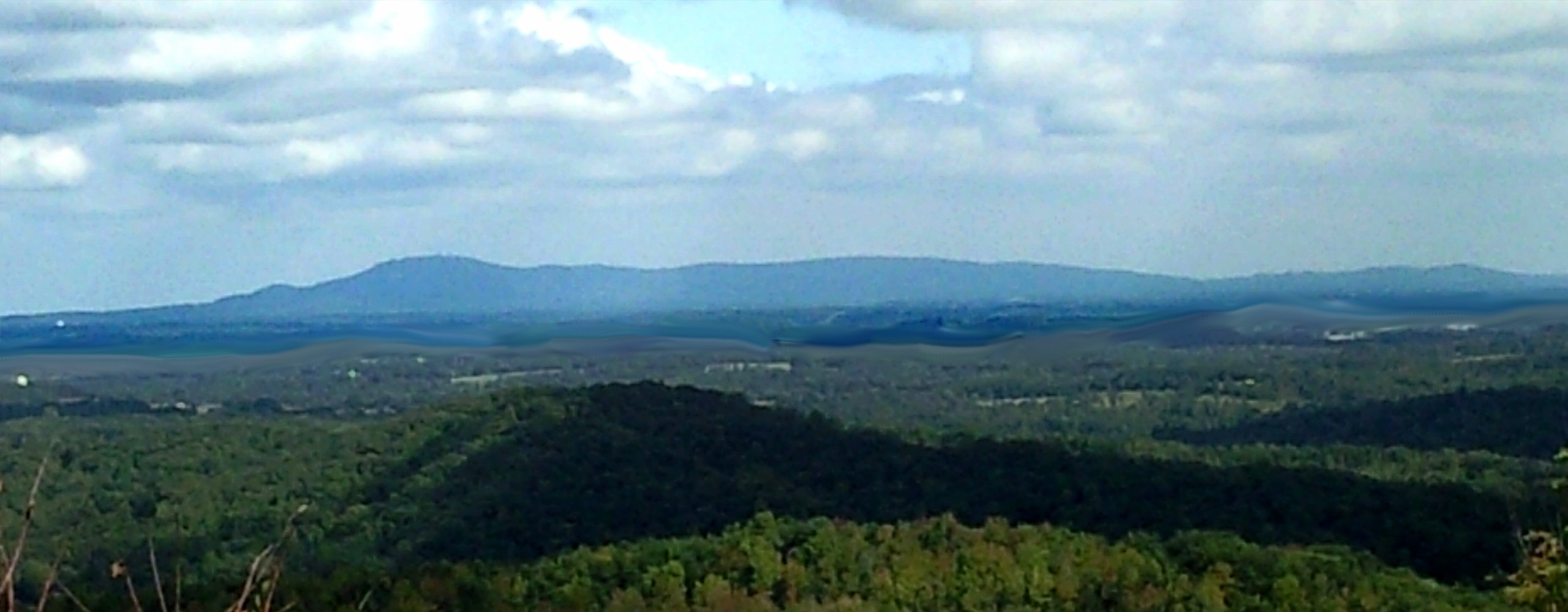
Paris Mountain.

Paris Mountain lies in the Piedmont region of the United States. The mountain is a monadnock, a mountain that stands alone in an area. The word "monadnock" comes from Mount Monadnock in New Hampshire. The elevation of Paris Mountain exceeds 2,000 feet (609.6 m). The Piedmont region where Paris Mountain is located is a raised plateau. The Piedmont, which means "foot of the mountain", covers a third of South Carolina and contains several other monadnocks in addition to Paris Mountain.

== Flora and fauna ==
Plant life

Paris Mountain State Park is home to around 73 different types of flora. The majority of the plant life on Paris Mountain is similar to plant life found on mountains farther north. Virginia Pine populates the highest elevations of the mountain. While the plant life resembles that of the mountains to the north, there are exceptions. Holly is evident on many parts of the mountain, even though the plant is not native to the region. Another plant covering the mountain in the springtime is arbutus. A special type of honeysuckle is also found on the mountain. This unusual honeysuckle was first discovered by Governor John Drayton. Rosebay rhododendron also grows on banks along the park's rivers.

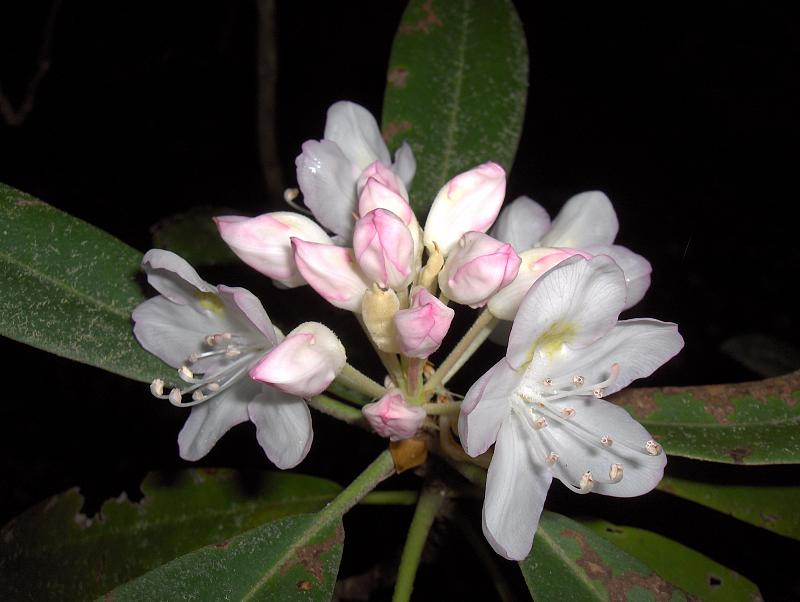
Rhododendron maximum is found in the park.

Wild life

The animal life on Paris Mountain consists mostly of possums, foxes, and snakes. Bass, bream, and catfish also populate the different park lakes. There are over 20 different species of birds inhabiting the mountain.

Geology

Mica, graphite and iron ore deposits have all been found on Paris Mountain.

== Recreation ==
Paris Mountain State Park is a center of activity for the city of Greenville. The park is host to nine trails for hikers and mountain bikers alike. George Hincapie, a Tour de France participant, lives in Greenville and is known to train in the park. Features to the trails include blazes, foot bridges, and trail signs. Paris Mountain State Park has a 40 site family campground with a mix of tent and RV sites. Camp Buckhorn is a group facility located on Buckhorn Lake at the north end of the park and consists of a lodge with a dining/meeting room for 75 people and 10 primitive cabins. Cabins are not rented separately. The 15-acre Lake Placid located in Paris Mountain State Park is the park's main spot for boating and fishing. North Lake, also known as Reservoir 3, is larger lake located in the park, is closed to boaters and reserved for fishermen. The lake is home to crappie, bream, and catfish. The visitor center, also known as the Park Center, is located next to Lake Placid and has maps and information about facilities.

Camp Buckhorn

Camp Buckhorn was built by the CCC in 1936-1937 as a place for groups. It has a lodge, and 10 cabins for overnight guests. and accommodates 40 people. In 2011, the main lodge underwent renovations funded by Paris Mountain Friends, the state government, and local establishments.

Paris Mountain Downhill Mountain Biking Race

The Paris Mountain Downhill Mountain Bike Race is part of the South Carolina Gravity Championships and acts as a qualifier to the USA Cycling Mountain Bike Gravity National Championships. The 2012 national championships took place at Beech Mountain, North Carolina. Limited to 99 riders, the course runs from Sulphur Springs trail around the top of the mountain to the park's archery range.

== See also ==
- List of U.S. state parks
