= The Complete TurtleTrader =

2009 book by Michael Covel

The Complete TurtleTrader: How 23 Novice Investors Became Overnight Millionaires
- Author: Michael Covel
- Genre: Business, Non-fiction
- Publisher: HarperCollins Publishers (USA)
- Publication date: 2009 (USA)
- Media type: Print
- Pages: 288
- ISBN: 0061241717
- Preceded by: Trend Following: Learn to Make Millions in Up or Down Markets
- Followed by: Trend Commandments: Trading for Exceptional Returns

The Complete TurtleTrader: How 23 Novice Investors Became Overnight Millionaires (2009) is an international bestseller written by Michael Covel. Covel recounts the story of Wall Street’s Richard Dennis and his disciples, the Turtles.

== Background ==
In 1994, Covel picked up an issue of Financial World and skimmed through an article titled "Wall Street's Top Players." Amongst famous investors like George Soros and Julian Robertson, Covel noticed a name he did not recognize at 25th on the list: R. Jerry Parker, who stated that he was trained as a "Turtle" by Richard Dennis (another name Covel did not recognize). Parker was the only investor in the top hundred advertised as being "trained," and as an investor himself, Covel found this story intriguing.

== Synopsis ==
Richard Dennis made over $200 million as a trader. After having a debate with his partner, William Eckhardt, about whether trading is learnable or an inborn talent, they proposed an experiment where they would spend two weeks training novices in the science of trading and then give them each $1 million to invest. The inspiration came from a trip Dennis took to a turtle-breeding farm in Singapore, stating, "We are going to grow traders just like they grow turtles."

Although each of the 1,000 applicants went through a rigorous application process designed to test their intelligence, ability to manage risk and mathematical skills, the makeup of the chosen Turtles differed greatly; they included a Czechoslovak-born blackjack master, a Dungeons & Dragons game designer, an evangelical accountant, a Harvard MBA, a U.S. Air Force pilot and a former pianist. The Turtles would go on to gross over $150 million in four years.

== Release and reception ==
The Complete TurtleTrader was Covel’s second bestseller and Stocks, Futures, Options Magazine named The Complete TurtleTrader as one of 2007’s top 10 trading, investing and personal finance books. Bloomberg noted that the book was worthy of a spot on any investor’s shelf and The Hindu called The Complete TurtleTrader “exciting and educative.”

== Editions ==
Title	Publisher	Publish Date	ISBN
The Complete TurtleTrader: The Legend, the Lessons, the Results [Hardcover]	Collins Business	October 9, 2007	9780061241703
The Complete TurtleTrader: How 23 Novice Investors Became Overnight Millionaires [Paperback]	Collins Business	February 24, 2009	978-0061241710
