= Andrew Law (financier) =

British financier and hedge fund manager (born 1966)

- Born: Andrew Eric Law; 14 June 1966 (age 60); Cheadle Hulme, Stockport, England
- Education: Cheadle Hulme High School; Sheffield University
- Occupation: Financier
- Employer: Caxton Associates
- Political party: Conservative

Andrew Eric Law (born 14 June 1966) is a British financier, hedge fund manager and philanthropist. He is the chairman, chief executive officer (CEO), and major shareholder of Caxton Associates, a hedge fund headquartered on Berkeley Square in London. He is chairman of the charity Futures for All (formerly Speakers for Schools), and sponsor of a Multi-Academy schools trust in Cheadle Hume, Manchester. In 2024, he was in fifth place in the Sunday Times Giving List.

== Early life and education ==
Andrew Eric Law was born on 14 June 1966, and raised in Cheadle Hulme near Stockport, England. His father was a mechanical engineer and his mother was a nurse. He was educated at Cheadle Hulme High School. He graduated from the University of Sheffield in Sheffield, South Yorkshire, with a First Class honours degree in Economics in 1987.

== Career ==
He started his career in finance at County NatWest, now known as NatWest. He then worked as a trader at the Chemical Bank. In 1996, he joined Goldman Sachs, later becoming a managing director, where he oversaw FICC.

=== Caxton Associates ===
He started working at Caxton Associates in London in 2003. In 2008, he became its chief investment officer. Since 2012, he has been its chairman and chief executive officer. Law is the company's main shareholder. In 2024, Caxton made a profit of £102 million; in 2023, its profit was £491 million.

== Political affiliations ==
Between May 2010 and January 2015, Law donated £947,911 to the Conservative Party, making him its 11th biggest donor in this period. In May 2017, he gave £250,000 to the Conservative Party. During the 2019 United Kingdom general election campaign Law donated £413,750 to the Conservative Party.

== Philanthropy ==
Law founded and chairs the AL Philanthropies charitable foundation, which funds projects in the educational, cultural, and environmental sectors. In 2024, he was in fifth place on the Sunday Times Giving List, donating £66.5 million that year. AL Philanthropies supports AL Elevation which sponsors the Laurus Trust, a Multi Academy Trust (MAT), headquartered in Cheadle Hulme, near Manchester. The MAT encompasses 16 schools in the 4-18 age range in primary, secondary and sixth-form contexts across Greater Manchester. In 2024 an Academic Football Pathway was announced with Manchester City Football Club.

Law is the chairman of the board of trustees of Futures For All (formerly Speakers For Schools), which supports and inspires young people from state schools and colleges in their early careers through Work Experience and Speakers For Schools programmes. As part of this programme, he spoke at the Trinity C.E. High School in Manchester.

Between 2020 and 2023, the foundation provided financial support to a Commission on Civil Society, a programme of research into how Britain could enhance the potential of civil society, chaired by Lord Gus O'Donnell.

In 2022, the foundation provided the £8.1 million funding for the Lowry to purchase L.S.Lowry's Going to the Match, the 1953 painting of people on their way to watch a Bolton Wanderers match at the former Burnden Park stadium. In 2014, it donated £1 million to The Lowry in Salford, where the spaces inside the Main Gallery are named Andrew Law Galleries.

In 2021 AL Philanthropies donated £5.85m to the University of Sheffield to launch a new student support programme and search for new therapies for a range of incurable and debilitating diseases.

In 2022, the foundation donated £3 million to the Science and Industry Museum in Manchester to fund the future of its Power Hall: Andrew Law Gallery, which reopened in 2025. In the same year, the foundation donated £2.9 million to Factory International, a destination for arts, music and culture, commissioning and present a year-round programme of interdisciplinary work by leading artists, which opened in 2023.

The foundation is a Global Alliance Founding Partner of Earthshot.

It supports many non-profit organisations, including the Policy Exchange, a think tank based in Westminster. Law was also on the board of trustees of Social Finance.

In an op-ed published in The Huffington Post in 2014, he called for hedge fund managers to be more philanthropic.

== Personal life ==
He was married to Zoë Law (née Purvis). They divorced in 2024.

According to The Sunday Times Rich List in 2025, Law is worth £1.2 billion.

He is a supporter of the football team, Manchester City F.C. He owns "Manchester City vs Sheffield United", a 1938 painting by L. S. Lowry.
