= Reminiscences of a Stock Operator =

1923 roman à clef by Edwin Lefèvre

- Title page, 1923 reprint; click to access a PDF
- Author: Edwin Lefèvre
- Language: English
- Genre: Finance
- Publisher: Wiley
- Publication date: 1923; 103 years ago
- Publication place: United States
- Pages: 288 pp.
- ISBN: 978-0-471-77088-6

Reminiscences of a Stock Operator is a 1923 roman à clef by American author Edwin Lefèvre. It is told in the first person by a character, in the book called Larry Livingston, inspired by the life of stock trader Jesse Livermore up to the time of writing.

The book remains in print (ISBN 0471770884). In December 2009, Wiley published an annotated edition in hardcover, ISBN 0-470-48159-5, that bridges the gap between Lefèvre's fictionalized account and the actual people and places referred to in the book. It also includes a foreword by hedge fund manager Paul Tudor Jones.

== Plot ==
The book can be divided into three parts:

- 1890-1910: Livermore was able to make easy money by taking advantage of the bid–ask spread on inactive stocks with leverage of 100-to-1 at bucket shops.
- 1910-1920: Livermore was a stock trader on the New York Stock Exchange, where he went boom and bust several times using high leverage.
- 1920s: Livermore engaged in market manipulation which was not illegal or without precedent then, charging fees of 25% of the market value of the manipulated stock. This was before the creation of the U.S. Securities and Exchange Commission in 1934.

== Accolades ==
In his 2008 book, The Age of Turbulence, Alan Greenspan called the book "a font of investing wisdom" and noted that quotes from the book such as "bulls and bears make money; pigs get slaughtered" are now adages.

A March 2005 article in Fortune listed it among "The Smartest Books We Know" about business.

In Market Wizards by Jack D. Schwager, many investors, including Richard Dennis, quoted the book as a major source of material on stock trading.
