= Futures for All =

British charity offering talks to schools

Futures For All
- Formation: 2010
- Legal status: Charity
- Headquarters: London
- CEO: Nick Brook
- Website: www.futuresforall.org

Futures for All (formerly Speakers for Schools), is a charity set up in 2010 by the journalist Robert Peston, to provide career speakers to state schools. The chairman since 2012 has been Andrew Law, Chairman and CEO of the hedge fund, Caxton Associates. Since 2016, the work of the charity has expanded to providing work experience for young people. Futures For All matches schools to employers, providing work experience and handling the paperwork’. It has supported 1,850,000 young people, delivering over 10,000 talks with over 35,000 young people attending work opportunities. It is now the largest UK provider of school-age work experience, providing more than 16,000 weeks to young people in 2025-26.

== Purpose and history ==
Founder Robert Peston, who attended a state school, created the charity after finding he was asked only to give talks at private schools. Peston explained: ‘It is all about broadening the knowledge and increasing the confidence of state school students — by bringing them into personal contact with highly successful people who urge them to work hard and aim high.’ Among those who have given talks for the charity are Bill Gates, David Cameron, Lily Cole, George Alagiah, Marcus du Sautoy, Charles Dunstone, Jo Elvin and Judy Murray. In 2023/24, the charity helped speakers deliver 619 school talks, reaching 180,000 young people. Over the charity's lifetime, it has delivered over 10,000 talks in schools, reaching over 1.85 million young people.

In 2024/25, the charity connected state-school educated young people with 289 employers to provide them with work experience. It also introduced the Work Experience Finder, the first national online portal matching young people with work experience opportunities.

The charity has also advocated for the provision of universal work experience which it estimates would cost taxpayers only £75 million a year. Their research found that two thirds of young adults cannot recall doing work experience. The Department of Education removed a statutory duty placed on schools to deliver work experience in 2012. The Labour party committed to providing two weeks of work experience for every pupil in their 2024 manifesto, but have yet to implement plans to deliver this.

In 2025, the charity changed its name from Speakers for Schools to Futures for All, to reflect the increasing significance of work experience provision within its activities. Its chief executive is Nick Brook, previously deputy general secretary of the National Association of Head Teachers.

In 2024, the charity's annual budget was £6.3m; the majority of the funds were provided by AL Philanthropies, the charitable foundation of its chairman, Andrew Law.
