= Richard Donchian =

American businessman

- Richard Donchian
- Born: September 1905; Hartford, Connecticut, U.S.
- Died: April 24, 1993 (aged 87); Fort Lauderdale, Florida, U.S.
- Education: Yale University; MIT
- Occupations: Commodities and Futures trader

Richard Davoud Donchian (September 1905 – April 24, 1993) was an American commodities and futures trader, and a pioneer in the field of managed futures.

The first publicly managed futures fund, Futures, Inc., was started by Donchian in 1949. He also developed the trend timing method of futures investing and introduced the mutual fund concept to the field of money management.

Richard Donchian is considered to be the creator of the managed futures industry and is credited with developing a systematic approach to futures money management. His professional trading career was dedicated to advancing a more conservative approach to futures trading.

== Biography ==
Donchian's parents were Armenian immigrants from Western Armenia, which was controlled by the Ottoman Empire in the 1880s, and had come to settle in the United States. As a young man Donchian went to school in Connecticut, later graduating from Yale University with a Bachelor of Arts degree in Economics. He later received his Master of Business Administration from MIT Sloan School of Management. Donchian's first taste of the job market was as an assistant in his family's Oriental rug business.

During this time, Donchian came across the fictionalized biography of stock market whiz Jesse Livermore, titled Reminiscences of a Stock Operator. After reading this book, Donchian became so fascinated that his interest turned to studying the financial markets. During the market crash of 1929 he lost some money. This experience led him to study technical analysis and become a student of price history alone and for its own sake.

Donchian began his Wall Street career in the 1930s. He published a very popular stock market service called Security Pilot which he sold to brokerage houses. During the summer of 1933 he became an account executive and securities analyst with Hemphill, Noyes and Co, while still working as the Vice President of the Samuel Rug Company.

World War II would take Richard Donchian into the US military and participation in the invasion of Sicily. He was later promoted to Air Force statistical officer. After the war he became a private investment adviser and securities analyst. He was self-employed until 1960. In 1948, he changed his focus from securities analysis to active trading and developing his rule-based technical system. He established the trading firm Futures, Inc., which was one of the first publicly held commodity funds.

Donchian developed a rule-based trading approach which became known as Trend following. It is based on the assumption that commodity prices moved in long, sustained moves. He developed and used a trading system that incorporated Trading rules, Trading guidelines, and his weekly rule system based on moving averages. He wrote many articles on futures trading and securities and became known as "the Father of Trend Following".

In 1950, Donchian created The Turtle Trading Rule, an efficient trend-following indicator, which evolved into the Donchian channel indicator, allowing traders to determine if a price movement was likely to continue in the same direction or change course. Three moving averages, upper and lower bands centered around a medium or median band, are typically included. The Donchian channel indicator may identify certain price breakouts in relation to its trading pattern, which allows it to produce trading signals. Additionally, such price channel can identify trends, highs and lows in the market, levels of support and resistance, market volatility, and breakouts.

In 1960, Donchian was appointed Director of Commodity Research with Hayden Stone, where he commenced writing a weekly newsletter, Commodity Trend Timing, based on his 5-20 moving average method. His newsletter was very popular, reaching a weekly circulation of some 10,000 copies during the 19 years he published it. He wrote numerous articles which are considered industry classics, including Trend Following Methods in Commodity Price Analysis. Donchian would remain with Hayden Stone's various successors, including Shearson/American Express, and later joined Shearson Lehman Brothers, eventually becoming Vice President of the firm. While working at Shearson Lehman Brothers, Donchian developed the technical analysis and trend-following strategies that are the fundamental components of many traders' systems today.

During his career he was a member of several exchanges, such as the New York Cotton Exchange, and several professional market associations, such as the New York Society of Security Analysts.

Donchian died in 1993, aged 87 in Fort Lauderdale, Florida.

Many modern trend following systems, such as the Turtle Trading system, are based on his work. The Richard Davoud Donchian Foundation was established after his death in April 1993; its aim is to make improvements in children's health and to help its ultimate recipients become empowered to strengthen and build up their families and communities – passing onto others that which was given to them.

== See also ==
- Trend following
- Donchian channel
- Technical analysis
