= Manley-Lefevre House =

Historic house in Vermont, United States

- U.S. National Register of Historic Places
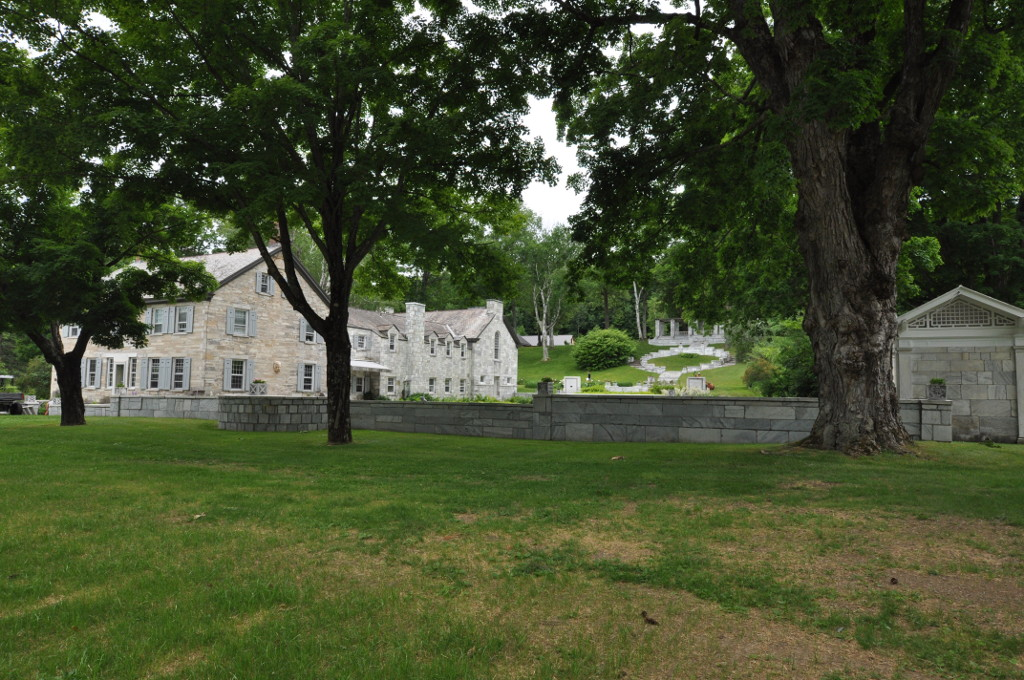

- Location within Vermont Location within the United States
- Location: 1161 Dorset West Rd., Town Hwy. 1, Dorset, Vermont
- Coordinates: 43°13′48″N 73°05′15″W
- Area: 100.3 acres (40.6 ha)
- Built: 1820
- Architect: Lang, Eugene J.; Lay, Charles Downing
- Architectural style: Federal, Federal Revival
- NRHP reference No.: 89002324
- Added to NRHP: January 26, 1990

The Manley-Lefevre House is a historic house at 1161 Dorset West Road in Dorset, Vermont. Built out of marble about 1820 and sympathetically enlarged 1908–1927, it is the centerpiece of a 100-acre (40 ha) farm estate that is now home to the Marble House Project, an arts organization offering residencies. The property was added to the National Register of Historic Places in 1990.

== Description and history ==
The Manley-Lefevre House stands on the west side of Dorset West Road, about 2 miles (3.2 km) south of Dorset village. The main house is a 2-1/2 structure, its walls and foundations built out of marble quarried either on the property or in West Rutland. The original main block is built out of ashlar stone, 20 inches (51 cm) thick, laid in irregular courses. It has a side gable roof, with brick chimneys built into the marble end walls. The front entrance retains original period flanking sidelights. The interior reflects significant alterations made in the early decades of the 20th century. Sympathetic additions extend to the rear of the original house.

The property includes a number of outbuildings, most of which have been either added or adapted for use as artist residences or studios. A portion of the larger property is in agricultural use, and hiking trails lead to the quarries from which stone for the original house was taken.

The main house was built sometime before 1820 by Martin Manley, on land originally purchased by his father George. The ashlar marble used in its construction was probably finished on site, while dressed trim elements where probably finished at a marble works in South Dorset. The Manley's quarry, later known as the Sanford Quarry, was one of Dorset's major quarries until its closure in the 1870s, its product shipped throughout the eastern United States.

In 1908 the Manley property was purchased by Edwin Lefevre, Sr., who commissioned New York City architect Eugene Lang to design additions and updates to the house, and retained garden designer Charles Downing Lay to design the gardens that surround the house. Lay prominently featured this work in his 1926 book, The Freedom of the City. Lefevre, the son of a Central American diplomat, was an author and entrepreneur, who established the first electric company providing power to Dorset.

== See also ==
- National Register of Historic Places listings in Bennington County, Vermont
