= Donchian channel =

Market trading indicator

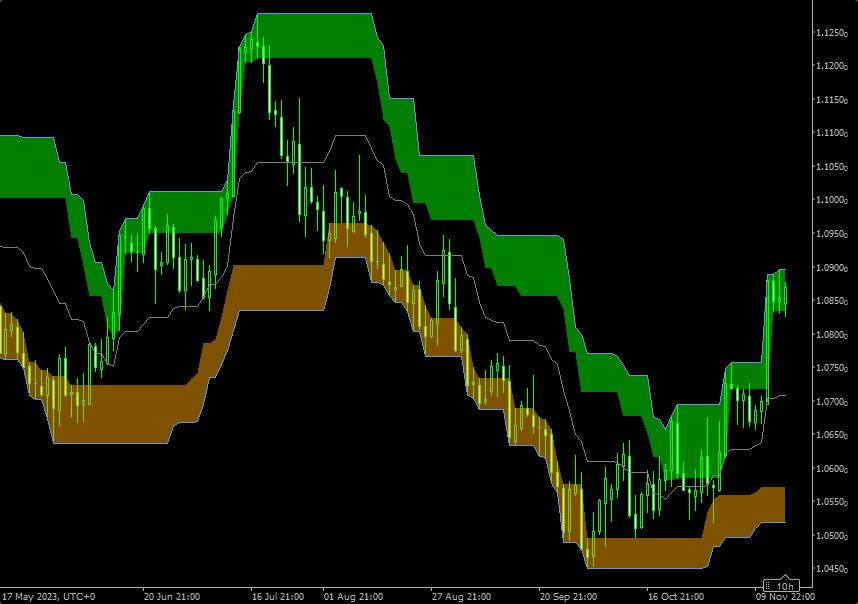
Donchian channel with support and resistance zones on EUR/USD

The Donchian channel is an indicator used in market trading developed by Richard Donchian. It is formed by taking the highest high and the lowest low of the last n periods. The area between the high and the low is the channel for the period chosen.

Donchian Channels are a technical indicator that seeks to identify bullish and bearish extremes that favor reversals, higher and lower breakouts, breakdowns, and other emerging trends.

The formulas for calculating the upper channel, lower channel, and the middle line at any given point of the chart are the following:
$$\textit{Upper} = \textit{Highest High}(N)$$
$$\textit{Lower} = \textit{Lowest Low}(N)$$
$$\textit{Middle} = {\textit{Upper} + \textit{Lower} \over 2},$$

where N is usually equal to 20.

It is commonly available on most trading platforms. On a charting program, a line is marked for the high and low values visually demonstrating the channel on the markets price (or other) values.

The Donchian channel is a useful indicator for seeing the volatility of a market price. If a price is stable the Donchian channel will be relatively narrow. If the price fluctuates, a lot the Donchian channel will be wider. Its primary use, however, is for providing signals for long and short positions. If a security trades above its highest n periods high, then a long is established. If it trades below its lowest n periods low, then a short is established.

Originally the n periods were based upon daily values. With today's trading platforms, the period may be of the value desired by the investor. i.e.: day, hour, minute, ticks, etc.

== Criticism ==
Extensive backtesting utilizing 360 years of exchange data and 4,887 test trades with the default setting of 20 indicates that the Donchian channel indicator was ineffective. The indicator yielded a win rate of 35% of trades. Combined with a reward to risk ratio of 2.0:1, it yields an expected profit of 5 cents per dollar invested. While this is positive, when combined with slippage, this indicator might be unprofitable.

== See also ==
- Bollinger bands
- Financial modeling
