= Trend Following =

Trend Following: Learn to Make Millions in Up or Down Markets
- Author: Michael Covel
- Language: English
- Genre: Business, non-fiction
- Publisher: Financial Times Press (USA)
- Publication date: 2009 (USA)
- Media type: Print
- Pages: 464
- ISBN: 013702018X
- Followed by: The Complete TurtleTrader: The Legend, the Lessons, the Results

Trend Following: Learn to Make Millions in Up or Down Markets is an international bestseller written by Michael Covel. It is about the investment strategy known as trend following, which uses the market trend mechanism and benefits from both sides of the market, enjoying profits from ups and downs of the stock or futures markets.

== Release and reception ==
The book was an international bestseller, with the publisher reporting over 100,000 copies sold to date. It was named top book about trading and commodity markets for last 15 years.
