= Larry Hite =

American hedge fund manager

Lawrence D. Hite
- Occupation: Hedge fund Manager

Lawrence D. Hite is a hedge fund manager who, along with Ed Seykota, is one of the forefathers of system trading. He is the author of the book, The Rule: How I Beat the Odds in the Markets and in Life—and How You Can Too, which was named a Wall Street Journal, LA Times, and Porchlight Books bestseller.

== Early life ==
During college, Hite was a rock music promoter, as well as an occasional actor and screenwriter, but eventually became serious about staying in the music business. However, after several incidents, he decided to become a stockbroker in 1968.

== Career ==
Larry Hite co-founded Mint Investments in 1981. By 1990, the company had become the largest commodity trading advisor in the world in terms of assets under management.

In 1990, Jack Schwager dedicated a chapter of his bestselling book, Market Wizards, to Hite's trading and risk management philosophy. In the same year, Hite began adding systematic trading of equity markets to the Mint managed futures portfolio. During this time, he also formed a partnership with the Man Group and pioneered the principal protected fund concept, leading to a number of successful structured products and financial engineering innovations.

In 1994, he retired from his role as hands-on fund manager at Mint. Since that time he maintained the position of managing director of Hite Capital LLC.

In 2000, Hite chose to focus on his family office activities, which included proprietary trading and the funding of continued research and development in the field of systematic trading. Joined by former members of the original Mint team, Hite formed Hite Capital Management.

In that same year, Hite became a principal investor and Chairman of North America region of Metropolitan Venture Partners, a venture capital firm specializing in technology-based firms. He maintains that position to date.

As of 2010, Hite partnered with International Standard Asset Management (ISAM) to create a multi-strategy platform of liquid hedge fund strategies as well as a fund of managed accounts.

== Philanthropy ==
Hite founded his own charitable enterprise, The Hite Foundation, where he serves as chairman. The foundation began with a focus on alleviating homelessness in New York, and aids scholars whose work and lives are threatened in repressive societies.

He also serves as Chairman of the Development Committee for the Institute of International Education's Scholar Rescue Fund. The committee's goal is to provide a safe haven for academics and professionals who are at risk throughout the world.

=== Books authored ===
- The Rule: How I Beat the Odds in the Markets and in Life--And How You Can Too (McGraw-Hill Education, 2019). ISBN 9781-2604-52655
