= Paul Cootner =

American economist

Paul H. Cootner
- Born: May 24, 1930; Logansport, Indiana
- Died: April 16, 1978 (aged 47); Stanford, California

Academic background
- Education: University of Florida (BA, MA) , Massachusetts Institute of Technology (PhD)
- Doctoral advisor: Walt Whitman Rostow

Paul Harold Cootner (May 24, 1930 – April 16, 1978) was a financial economist noted for his book The Random Character of Stock Market Prices.

Cootner was born in Logansport, Indiana. He attended the University of Florida, where he earned bachelor's and master's degree. He received a PhD in industrial economics from the Massachusetts Institute of Technology in 1953.

He worked at Brown University briefly before serving in the Army. He then joined Resources for the Future.

He joined finance faculty of the MIT Sloan School of Management in 1959, where he started work on the "random walk" theory of securities prices, work that led to the 1964 publication of his groundbreaking book.

In 1970, he left MIT to join the faculty of the Graduate School of Business at Stanford University.

He died unexpectedly of a heart attack in 1978.

== Bibliography ==
- Cootner, Paul H.; Sharpe, William F.; Cootner, Cathryn M. (1982). Financial economics: essays in honor of Paul Cootner. Prentice-Hall. ISBN 978-0-13-315291-3.
- Cootner, Paul H. (1964). The random character of stock market prices. MIT Press. ISBN 978-0-262-03009-0.
