= Edwin Lefèvre =

American journalist, writer, and diplomat (1871-1943)

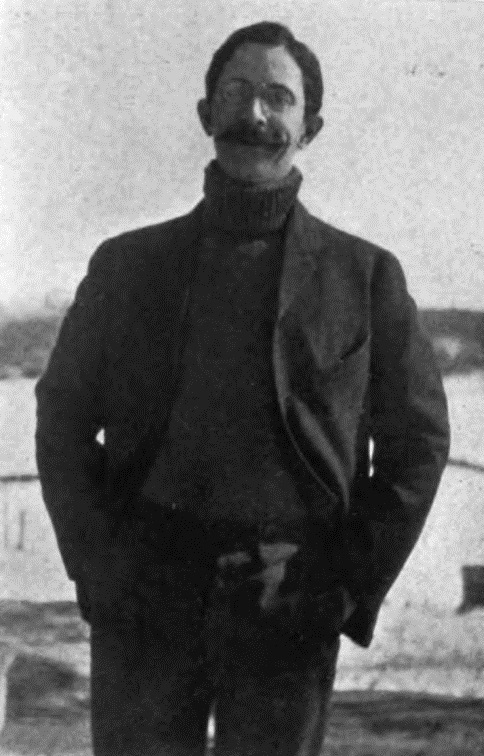
Edwin Lefèvre no later than 1907

Edwin Lefèvre (1871–1943) was an American journalist, writer, and diplomat, who is most noted for his writings on Wall Street business.

== Biography ==
Lefèvre was born George Edwin Henry Lefèvre on January 23, 1871 in Colón, Colombia (now the Republic of Panama). He was the son of Emilia Luísa María Santiago de la Ossa, sister of Jerónimo, a poet and diplomat who wrote the lyrics of the national anthem of Panama Himno Istmeño and María de la Ossa de Amador, and Henry Lefèvre (1841–1899). Henry was born in Jersey, in the Channel Islands and emigrated to the United States in his youth. For many years, Henry was the general agent of the Pacific Steamship Company American for Panama. Their son, Edwin, bore dual citizenship and was sent to the United States when he was a boy.

He completed his education at Lehigh University, where he received training as a mining engineer. At the age of nineteen, however, he began his career as a journalist and eventually became a stockbroker, as well. Following his father's death, Edwin inherited some wealth and became an independent investor. While living in Hartsdale, New York, a collection of Edwin Lefèvre's short stories were published (1901) under the title, Wall Street Stories. This was followed by several novels about money and finance, until 1908, when Lefèvre and his wife, Martha, and their children moved to a country estate in East Dorset, Vermont. In 1909, he was appointed ambassador to Spain and Italy by his native country, Panama. Lefèvre did work as a broker on Wall Street and was the financial writer for the New York Sun newspaper. He later returned to his home in Vermont where he resumed his literary work, providing short stories for magazines such as, The Saturday Evening Post, and writing novels.

Of the eight books written by Edwin Lefèvre, his Reminiscences of a Stock Operator is considered a classic of American business writing. The book began as a series of twelve articles published during 1922 and 1923 in The Saturday Evening Post. It is written as first-person fiction, telling the story of a professional stock trader on Wall Street. While published as fiction, generally, it is accepted to be the biography of stock market whiz Jesse Livermore. The book has been reprinted in almost every decade since its original publication in 1925, the latest put out by John Wiley & Sons in hardcover and a paperback edition in 1994 that remains in print. It has been translated into the Chinese, German, French, Polish, and Italian languages, amongst others. A George H. Doran Company first edition, even in fair condition, may sell today for more than a thousand dollars. In December 2009, Wiley published an annotated edition that bridges the gap between Lefèvre's fictionalized account and the personalities, exploits, and locations that populate the book. Page margins notations in the 2009 edition explain the historical setting and the real companies, individuals, and news events to which Lefèvre alludes.

In 1925, Lefèvre authored a second book about a stock trader, a factual biography with the title The Making of a Stockbroker. This book was about John K. Wing, a senior partner of Bronson and Barnes, a major Boston stockbrokerage, whose approach to the business provided a contrast to that of Jesse Livermore, the veiled subject of his earlier book.

On his death in 1943 (aged 71-72), Edwin Lefèvre's estate in Dorset, Vermont (near Manchester) was passed to his widow. Built about 1820, it was the first home in the United States made with marble quarried right on the property. Their eldest son, Edwin Lefèvre, Jr. (b. 1902), who also worked on Wall Street, inherited the home and completely restored it in 1968 when he retired there. Now it is listed on the National Register of Historic Places. Their second son, Reid Lefèvre (b. 1904), was the founder of the traveling carnival known as the "King Reid Show" and a politician. He was elected to the Vermont General Assembly, serving as a member of the House of Representatives from 1947 to 1959 and the state Senate from 1961 to 1963.

== Bibliography ==
- Wall Street Stories (1901)
- Golden Flood (1905)
- Sampson Rock of Wall Street (1907)
- H.R. (1915)
- Plunderers (1916)
- To the Last Penny (1917)
- Simonetta (1919)
- Reminiscences of a Stock Operator (1923)
- Making of a Stockbroker (1925)
