= Carl Hite =

American academic administrator

President of Cleveland State Community College
- Incumbent
- Assumed office 1996

Personal details
- Education: University of Florida; Florida State University

Carl Hite is an American academic administrator who is the President of Cleveland State Community College. He received his bachelor's degree from Florida State University, and his Doctorate of Philosophy in Higher Education Administration from the University of Florida.
