= Jacob Hite =

Jacob Hite (1719-1776) was one of the wealthiest men in what is now Berkeley County, West Virginia. Hite had come to the Valley with his father in the early 1730s. A prominent family, Hite had served as sheriff twice for Frederick County and also as justice of the peace for that county as well as Berkeley. His son, Thomas, was a member of the House of Burgesses. Hite is most famous for his assault on the Martinsburg county jail in April 1774 and his rivalry with Adam Stephen.

== Early life ==
He was the son of a highly successful Shenandoah Valley land speculator, Jost Hite, a German immigrant, and Anna Maria (Merkle) Hite, both of Bonfeld, Duchy of Wurttemberg. His sister, Magdalena (Hite) Chrisman, is an ancestor to Major League Baseball pitcher Tug McGraw and country music star Tim McGraw.

== Business scheme ==
In the late 1760s, Hite and his business partner, Richard Pearis, created a scheme to obtain a large tract of land from Cherokee Indians, using Pearis' son, George, who was half-Cherokee, as a pawn. Cherokee headmen viewed men like George Pearis as useful diplomatic bridges to the British. George obtained a 150,000-acre (610 km^{2}) tract of land just west of South Carolina from the headmen. He then sold it to his father and Hite. Though the scheme was clever, a British official feared it may provoke the Cherokees to join an anti-British confederation Indian diplomats were forming at the time. The official persuaded a South Carolina court to void the deal.

== Financial troubles ==
The voided deed to the Cherokee land left Hite in serious financial trauma. He had no means of paying a large debt that he owed to James Hunter, a Scottish trader. Hunter was feeling pressure from his own creditors in England and demanded Berkeley County sheriff Adam Stephen to auction off enough of Hite's estate to pay the debt. Stephen and several deputies went to Hite's plantation and seized fifteen of Hite's slaves and twenty-one of his horses, and brought them to the county jail in Martinsburg-the county seat-to be put up for auction.

Pennsylvania Chronicle, Sep 26—Oct 3, 1772:152, advertisement: On Thursday, the 15th of October next, will be sold by Public Vendue, on the premises {pursuant to a decree of the County Court of Frederick, in the colony of Virginia, for satisfying a debt due from Jacob Hite to Richard and Peter Footman, Francis Richardson, Clement Biddle, and Daniel Wisser} A valuable tract of land, containing 3118 Acres {more or less} with the dwelling-house, stores, and buildings thereon erected, situate in Berkeley County, {formerly part of Frederick County} within 13 miles (21 km) of Winchester, on the great road leading thence from Shweringan's Ferry. The said tract is well watered and improved, being the plantation whereon the said Jacob Hite now lives, and from its situation, and other great improvements and advantages, is esteemed equal to any place in Frederick County.--Also, twenty-seven valuable Negro Slaves [Sep 17, 1772].

== Assault on the Martinsburg Jail ==
Hite vigorously resented his property being taken in this manner. He wrote to his neighbor and friend Horatio Gates that the sale was to take place and threatened to stop it or sue any man who bought his property. The threat was accompanied by the more peaceful, though contradictory, suggestion that Gates and other friends of Hite's buy the property at the sale and Hite would pay them back. Gates, however, used a more direct way to aid Hite. Acting in his authority as a magistrate, Gates allowed Hite to proceed against those persons who were "active in plundering him."

Hite decided to take matters into his own hands. A friend of Hite's, who was the constable, Daniel Hendricks, assembled a posse, including Hite's son Thomas. The posse armed themselves with several weapons and advanced on the Martinsburg jail on April 14, 1774. Sheriff Stephen deputized many men and directed them to guard Hite's slaves and horses. But the gang surrounded the jail, overpowered the guards, and tied up the jailor, who refused to turn over the keys. The posse then chopped down the jail door with axes and broke the lock on the stable door. The gang seized the slaves and horses, and also freed Marty Handley, a prisoner for debt, and a runaway servant. The posse fled for Hite's house, bringing with them two of the prison guards.

Later in the day, Hite received word that Stephen's band was going to attack. Hite feared that his property may still be sold. Hite was also concerned for his slaves, he did not want their families divided. Hite then realized that he and his slaves had a common interest in not being sold, and Hite needed more fighters. Hite then proceeded into the kitchen where his slaves were and told them to follow the white men in the attack with whatever weapons they had. But the slaves never had to fight, as the attack was so delayed that Hite directed them south down the Great Wagon Road toward his illegal Cherokee property. Along the road, at least some of Hite's slaves were captured and sold at auction. In this regard, Hite epitomized the desperation that many Americans were feeling at this time in American history, as thousands of Americans were in serious financial trouble with their creditors as well.

== Legal battles ==
Seven members of Hite's posse were arrested for the assault. Before Gates and other justices of the peace, they were tried for breach of the peace but acquitted, though they had to go bond to guarantee their good behavior for twelve months. This made tempers flare even more. Hite and his friends filed a court action against Stephen and other officials. Stephen then realized that he may become liable himself for a suit for recovery of the debt. Stephen received intervention from the General Court, which upheld the original judgment against Hite. The General Court refrained from any further decision however, because at this point the Virginia courts began to refuse to try suits brought by creditors against debtors, and the upcoming American Revolution was just beginning. Although the legal battles were never resolved, the personal feud between Hite and Adam Stephen would become even worse.

== Rivalry with Adam Stephen ==
Hite was determined to settle the score with Stephen. Hite went to the public print to let people know what kind of man he felt Stephen was. He published a lengthy indictment of Stephen's handling of Hite's debt case with Hunter in the Virginia Gazette on July 6, 1775. Hite hoped to disparage Stephen's character. In the piece, Hite accused Stephen of forcibly taking his property to satisfy the debt and getting an injunction from the General Court "to stop whatever monies were in his or his deputy's hands, belonging to me, for the satisfaction of Mr. Hunter's demands against me." Stephen printed a rebuttal in the Virginia Gazette three months later on September 30, 1775. In his piece, Stephen insisted that Hunter had given Hite ample extension of time to pay off the debt and he was simply carrying out his duties as a sheriff.

== Abrupt death ==
Though the feud between Hite and Stephen was extremely bitter, it was never resolved. Stephen headed off to fight in the American Revolutionary War and shortly after the printing of Stephen's rebuttal of Hite's accusations, Hite was killed by a band of Cherokee Indians upon returning to his new home in South Carolina.

Dateline, Williamsburg, Aug 30, 1776, passing along news from Mr. William Harrison, that "Captain John Hingston, with a number of settlers, arrived at Licking creed, near the Kentucky...Mr. Harrison likewise informs, that Mr. Jacob Hite, who lately removed from Berkeley county to the neighbourhood of the Cherokee country, with his family and a large parcel of negroes, were murdered at his own house by those savages, with most of his slaves, and his wife and children carried off prisoners; his son, who was in the Cherokee country, was likewise murdered. The Shawnee, Delawares, and Mingoes, had not met our commissioners, although two expresses had been sent to them for that purpose...".

== Resources ==
Hart, Freeman H. The Valley of Virginia in the American Revolution: 1763-1789. New York: Russell and Russell, 1942.

Holton, Woody. Forced Founders: Indians, Debtors, Slaves, & the Making of the American Revolution in Virginia. Chapel Hill: University of North Carolina Press, 1999.

Ward, Harry M. Major General Adam Stephen and the Cause of American Liberty. Charlottesville: University Press of Virginia, 1989.
