= Michael Marcus (trader) =

American futures trader (1947–2023)

Michael Phillips Marcus
- Born: August 2, 1947
- Died: March 25, 2023 (aged 75)

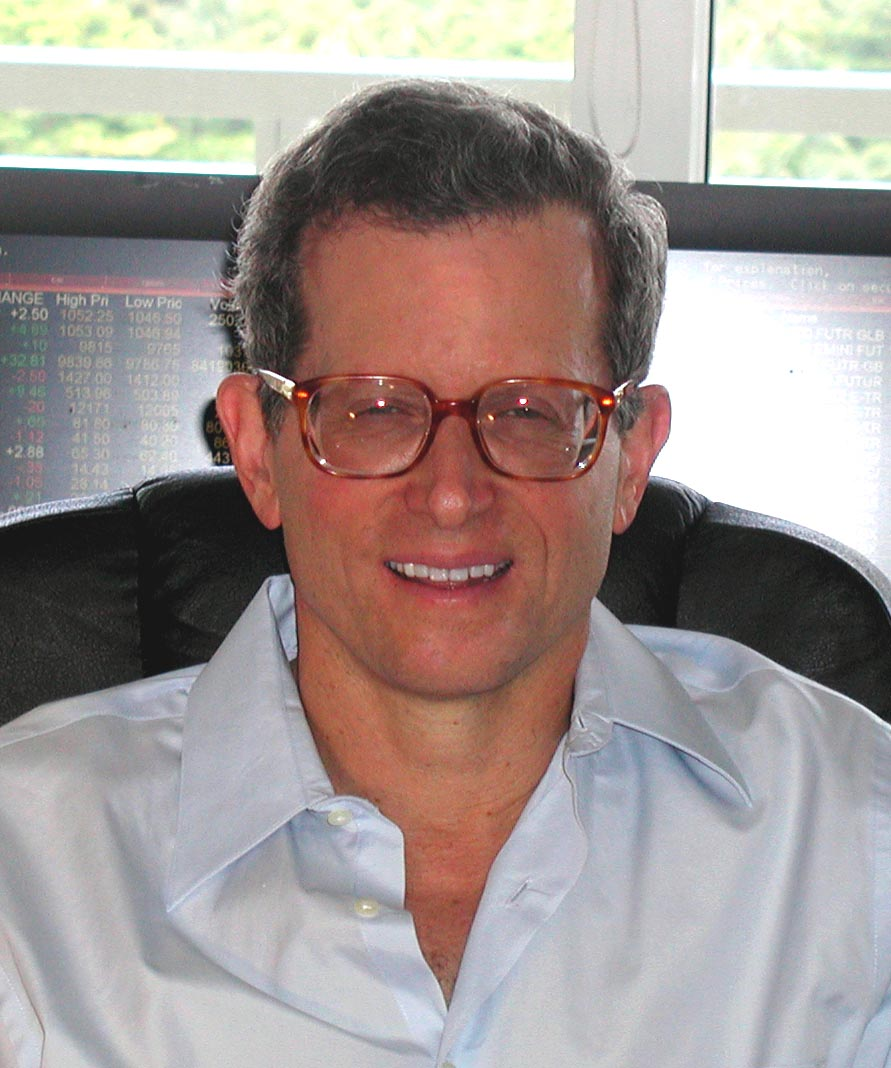
Michael Marcus at his trading office.

Michael Phillips Marcus was a commodities trader who, in less than 20 years, is reputed to have turned his initial $30,000 into $80 million.

== Career ==
Marcus began his trading career in 1972 when he bought plywood futures with his life savings of $7000. In the summer of 1972 President Richard Nixon froze prices of some commodities, but the futures contracts rallied sharply, increasing Marcus' stake from $7000 into $12,000. In 1973 he turned $24,000 into $64,000.

Marcus learned money management laws from Ed Seykota, whom he met while working as an analyst. Marcus eventually became an EVP at Commodities Corporation. Marcus has recently invested in small-company stock through his holding company Canmarc Trading Co and later made private-placement investments in small OTC Bulletin Board listed companies like Prospector Consolidated Resources and Encore Clean Energy Inc and Pink Sheets Touchstone Resources.

ViRexx Medical Corp, a company focused on immunotherapy treatments for certain cancers, chronic hepatitis B and C, and embolotherapy treatments for tumors, announced Marcus's election to its Board of Directors at its Annual General Meeting held May 25, 2006.

Marcus was briefly featured by Thomas A Bass, in the book The Predictors: How a Band of Maverick Physicists Used Chaos Theory to Trade Their Way to a Fortune on Wall Street. Additionally, Marcus was interviewed by Jack Schwager in the book Market Wizards. Marcus was described as a chartist who "keeps an eye on market penetration and resistance."

== Education and personal life ==
Raised in Providence, Rhode Island to a Jewish household, Marcus' father was a judge and his mother was a teacher. He graduated in 1969 Phi Beta Kappa from Johns Hopkins and studied Psychology at Clark University. At one time he was a devout follower of the Maharishi Mahesh Yogi.

== Children ==
Michael had two children, Aubrey (birth name Christopher), and Will.

== Death ==
Michael Marcus died on March 25, 2023, in Austin, Texas. After his death, his son Aubrey talked about his life in an episode of his podcast.
