= William Eckhardt (trader) =

William Eckhardt is a trader.

== Education ==
Eckhardt never finished his PhD in mathematics, claiming that he left graduate school for the trading pits after an unexpected change of thesis advisors. Despite leaving academia prematurely, Eckhardt has published several papers in academic journals. In 1993, Eckhardt's article "Probability Theory and the Doomsday Argument" was published in the philosophical journal Mind. His follow-up article, "A Shooting-Room view of Doomsday" was published in The Journal of Philosophy in 1997. Both articles make arguments skeptical of the Doomsday Argument as formulated by John Leslie. In 2006, he published "Causal time asymmetry" in the journal Studies In History and Philosophy of Modern Physics. In 2013, he published a book "Paradoxes in Probability Theory"

== Notes ==
- Eckhardt, William (May 1994). "The c-Test". Stocks & Commodities magazine.
- Collins, Art (April 2005). "Interview: Richard Dennis". Stocks & Commodities magazine.
- Eckhardt, William. (2006). "Causal time asymmetry". Studies in History and Philosophy of Science Part B: Studies in History and Philosophy of Modern Physics. 37 (3): 439–466. doi:10.1016/j.shpsb.2006.04.001.
- Eckhardt, William (2013). Paradoxes in Probability Theory. Springer.
