= Upcountry History Museum =

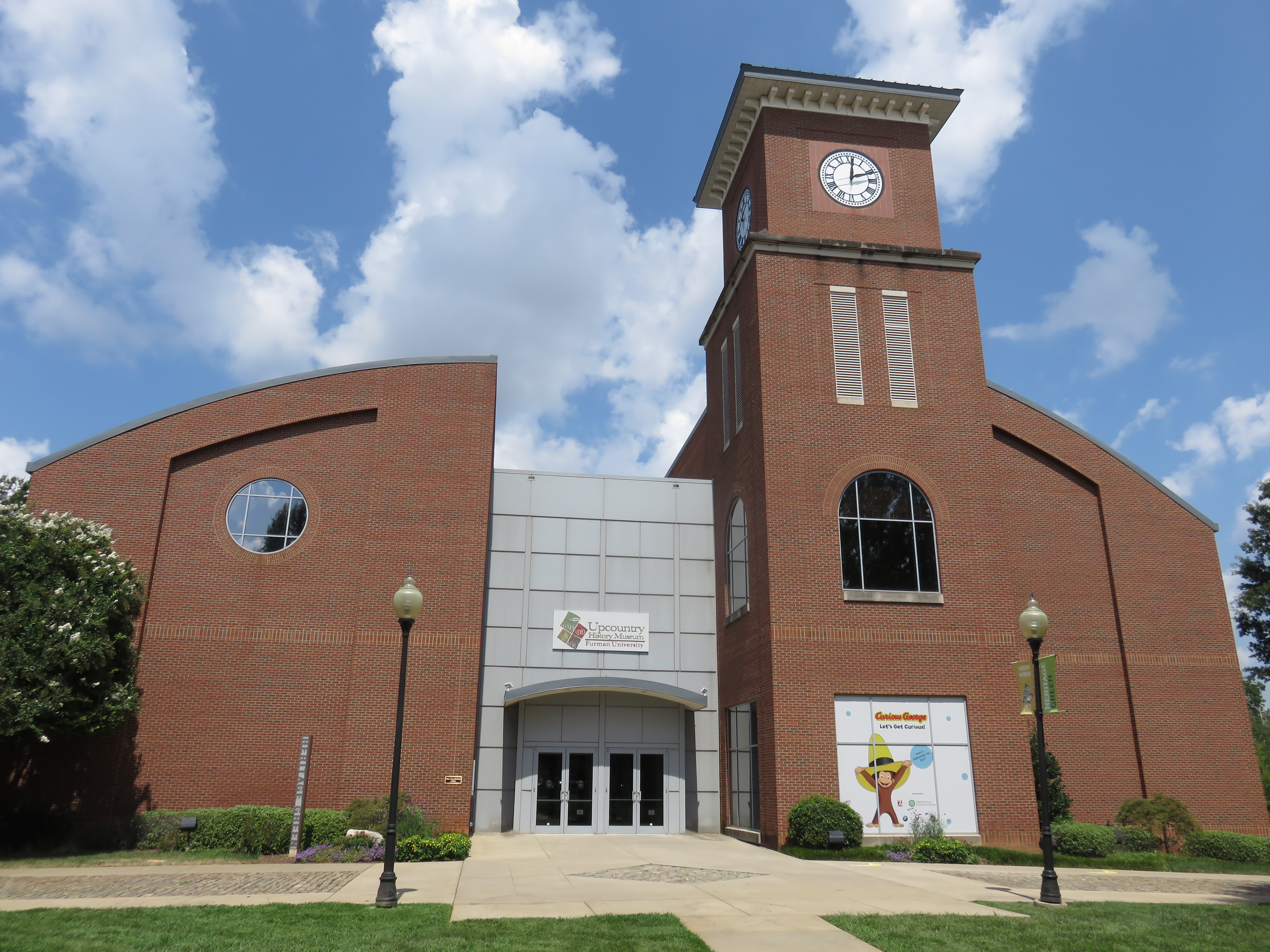
- Established: September 2007
- Location: 540 Buncombe Street, Greenville, South Carolina 29601
- Coordinates: 34°51′26″N 82°24′11″W
- Type: History museum
- Website: Official website

The Upcountry History Museum is a history museum in Greenville, South Carolina that displays the regional history of fifteen upstate South Carolina counties from the early 18th century to the present. Exhibits designed by Christopher Chadbourne and Associates emphasize technology rather than artifacts "to engage the senses, ignite the imagination and transport visitors back in time."

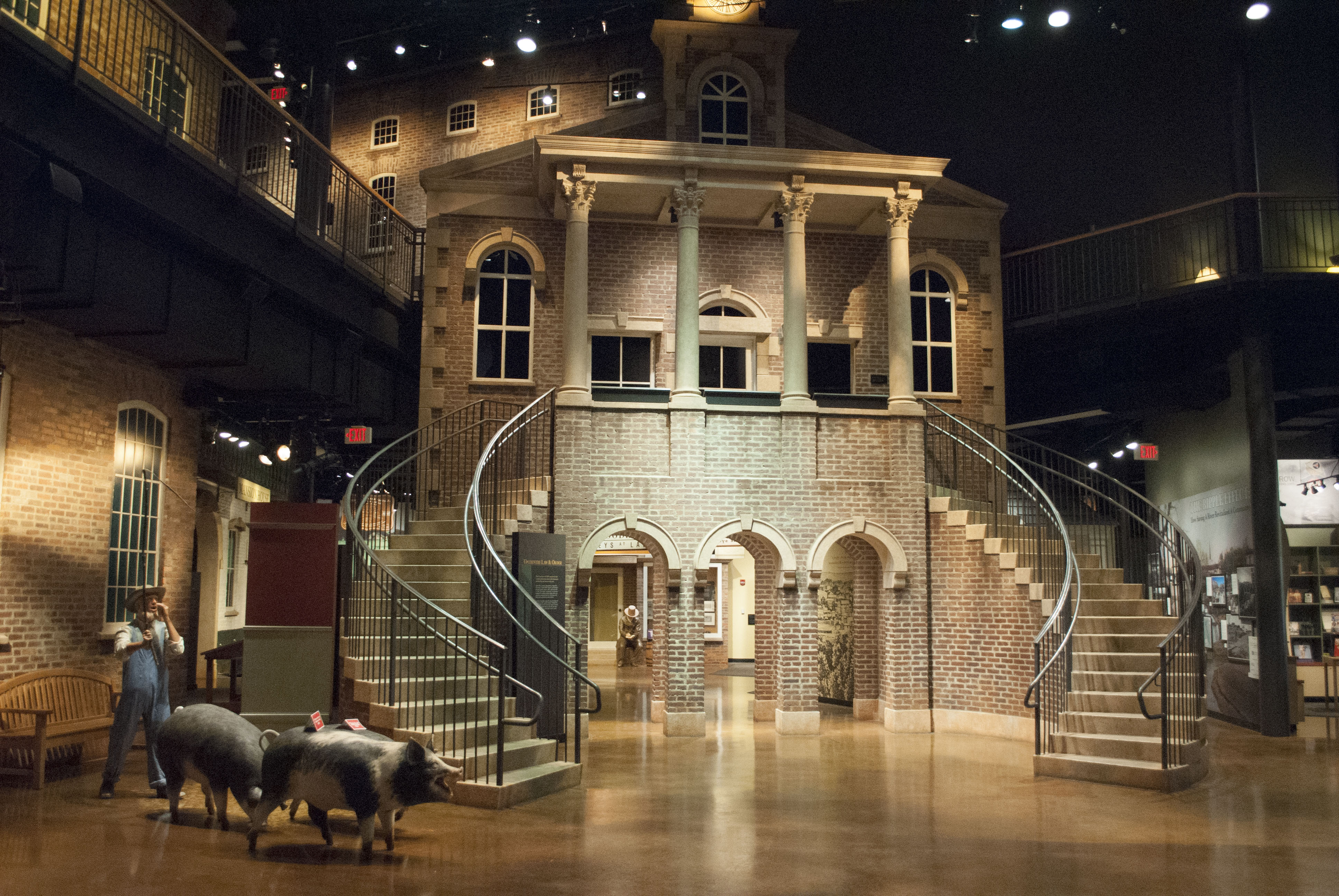
Interior of the museum

The museum is located on Greenville's Heritage Green with The Children's Museum, the Greenville County Art Museum, Sigal Music Museum, the Greenville County Main Library, and the Greenville Little Theatre. The museum opened in September 2007 and is operated by Furman University.

In 2015, the Upcountry History Museum was named a Smithsonian affiliate. Its first Smithsonian exhibit was Searching for the Seventies: The DOCUMERICA Photography Project.
