= Jesse Livermore =

American stock trader (1877–1940)

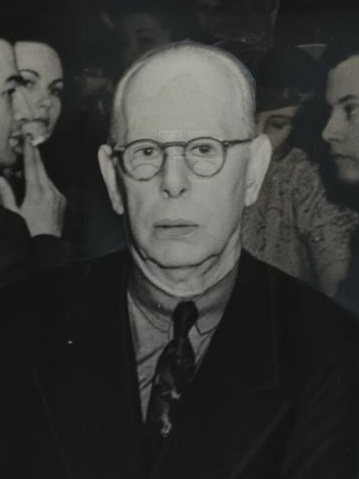
- Livermore in 1940
- Born: Jesse Lauriston Livermore; July 26, 1877; Shrewsbury, Massachusetts, U.S.
- Died: November 28, 1940 (aged 63); New York City, U.S.
- Cause of death: Suicide by gunshot
- Other names: Boy Plunger; The Wolf of Wall Street; The Great Bear of Wall Street
- Occupations: Stock trader; investor
- Spouses: Nettie Jordan (m. 1900; div. 1917) Dorothea "Dorothy" Wendt (m. 1918; div. 1932) Harriet Metz Noble (m. 1933)
- Children: 2
- Relatives: Brandi Love (great-granddaughter)

Jesse Lauriston Livermore (July 26, 1877 – November 28, 1940) was an American stock trader. He is considered a pioneer of day trading and was the basis for the main character of Reminiscences of a Stock Operator, a best-selling book by Edwin Lefèvre. At one time, Livermore was one of the richest people in the world; however, at the time of his suicide, he had liabilities greater than his assets.

In a time when accurate financial statements were rarely published, getting current stock quotes required a large operation, and market manipulation was rampant, Livermore used what is now known as technical analysis as the basis for his trades. His principles, including the effects of emotion on trading, continue to be studied.

Some of Livermore's trades, such as taking short positions before the 1906 San Francisco earthquake and just before the Wall Street crash of 1929, are legendary within investing circles. Some observers have regarded Livermore as the greatest trader who ever lived, but others have regarded his legacy as a cautionary tale about the risks of leverage to seek large gains rather than a strategy focused on smaller yet more consistent returns.

== Early life ==
Livermore was born in Shrewsbury, Massachusetts, to a poverty-stricken family and moved to Acton, Massachusetts, as a child. Livermore learned to read and write at the age of three-and-a-half. At the age of 14, his father pulled him out of school to help with the farm; however, with his mother's blessing, Livermore ran away from home.

== Career ==
In 1891, at the age of 14, he secured employment, as a “board boy,” posting stock quotes at a Boston, Massachusetts, branch of the PaineWebber stock brokerage, at the rate of $5 per week. In 1892, at the age of 15, Livermore made his first profit off the stock market when he bet on five shares of the Chicago, Burlington and Quincy Railroad for $5 at a bucket shop. A bucket shop did not buy or sell the stock, but instead took bets on whether a particular stock's prices would rise or fall. Livermore’s bet returned a profit of three dollars and twelve cents.

At the age of 16, he quit his job, began trading full-time, and from 1893 to 1894, Livermore, nicknamed by fellow traders "The Boy Plunger" (“plunger” being a colloquial term for a reckless gambler or speculator), was earning about $200 per week at the bucket shops in Boston, much more than his salary at PaineWebber. He brought $1,000 home to his mother to repay the $5 she had given him before running away, however she disapproved of his "gambling"; he countered that he was not gambling, but "speculating".

From 1895–1897, age 18–20, he accumulated $10,000 trading profits, a one thousand percent net return in three years of trading. However, he was eventually barred by most Boston area bucket shops, because of his consistent winning. Using disguises and false names to trade only prolonged the inevitable city-wide ban.

From 1898–1900, age 21–22, he continued trading with Haight & Freese, the last Boston area bucket shop which had not banned him. However, Haight & Freese gradually widened the bid-ask spread and imposed restrictive margin requirements which made it much more difficult and risky for Livermore to make money.

On September 14, 1900, age 23, he moved to New York, arriving in time for a strong bull market in stocks. He traded successfully, on the long side, at Harris, Hutton & Company stockbrokers, turning $10,000 into $50,000 in five days. In May 1901, he anticipated a correction and went short, using 400% margin. He lost his entire stake, as the ticker tape was not updated fast enough to make current trading decisions. He borrowed $2,000 from Edward Francis Hutton and moved to St. Louis, where he was not known, and went back to betting at bucket shops.

His first big win came in 1901 at the age of 24 when he bought stock in Northern Pacific Railway. He turned $10,000 into $500,000.

In 1906, he vacationed in Palm Beach, Florida, at the club of Edward R. Bradley. While on vacation, at the direction of Thomas W. Lawson, he took a massive short position in Union Pacific Railroad the day before the 1906 San Francisco earthquake, leading to a $250,000 profit. Some time later, Livermore went long on the stock; however, his friend, and owner of the brokerage house in which he did most of his trading, Edward Hutton, erroneously convinced Livermore to close his position, and he wound up losing $40,000.

In the Panic of 1907, Livermore's huge short positions made him $1 million in a single day. However, his idol, J. P. Morgan, who had bailed out the entire New York Stock Exchange during the crash, requested him to refrain from further short selling. Livermore agreed and instead, profited from the rebound, boosting his net worth to $3 million. He bought a $200,000 yacht, a rail car, and an apartment on the Upper West Side. He joined exclusive clubs and had mistresses.

In 1908, he listened to advice from cotton trader Theodore H. "Teddy" Price, who told him to buy cotton, while Price secretly sold. He lost most of his profits from the previous year's trading through this venture. Finally, in 1915, he filed for bankruptcy, not having fully recovered from his disastrous venture into cotton.

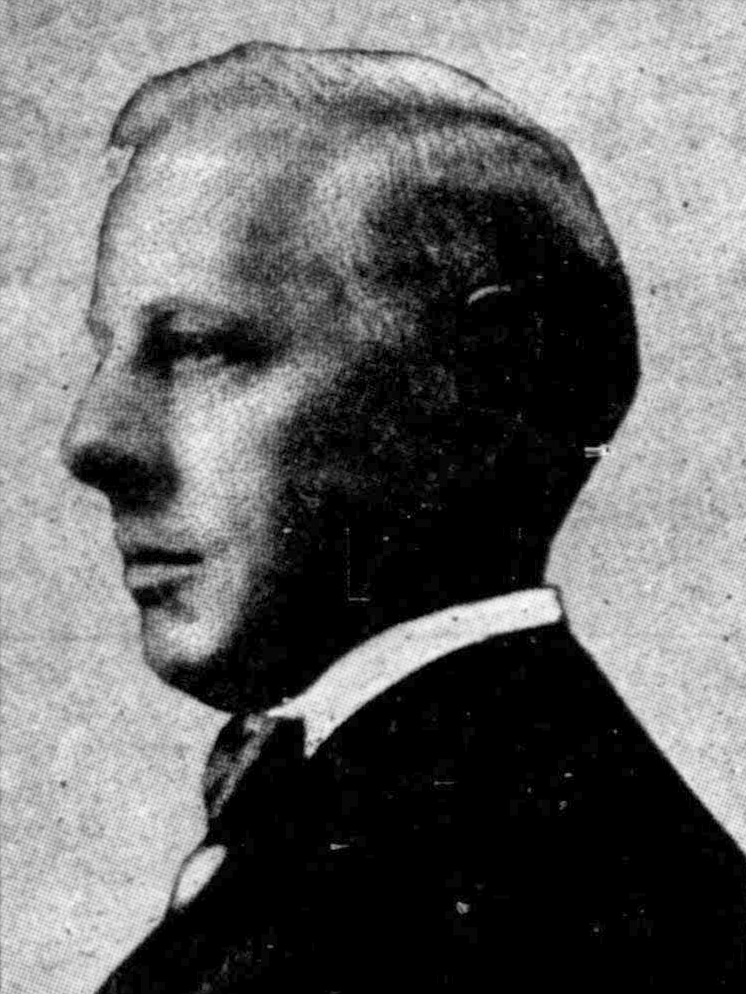
Livermore, c. 1923

Following the end of World War I, Livermore secretly cornered the market in cotton. It was only intervention by President Woodrow Wilson, prompted by a call from the United States Secretary of Agriculture, who asked him to the White House for a discussion that stopped his move. He agreed to sell back the cotton at break-even, thus preventing a troublesome rise in the price of cotton. When asked why he had cornered the cotton market, Livermore replied, "To see if I could, Mr. President."

In 1924–1925, he engaged in market manipulation, making $10 million trading wheat and corn in a battle with Arthur W. Cutten and engineering a short squeeze on the stock of Piggly Wiggly.

In early 1929, he amassed huge short positions, using more than 100 stockbrokers to hide what he was doing. By the spring, he was down over $6 million on paper. However, upon the Wall Street crash of 1929, he netted approximately $100 million. Following a series of newspaper articles declaring him the "Great Bear of Wall Street", he was blamed for the crash by the public and received death threats, leading him to hire an armed bodyguard.

His second divorce in 1932, the non-fatal shooting of his son by his wife in 1935, and a lawsuit from his Russian mistress led to a decline in his mental health, while the creation of the U.S. Securities and Exchange Commission in 1934 imposed new rules that affected his trading. Although it is unknown exactly how it happened, he eventually lost his fortune and filed bankruptcy for the third time in 1934, listing assets of $84,000 and debts of $2.5 million. He was suspended as a member of the Chicago Board of Trade on March 7, 1934.

In 1937, he paid off his $800,000 tax bill.

In 1939, he opened a financial advisory business, selling a technical analysis system.

== Personal life ==
One of Livermore's favorite books was Extraordinary Popular Delusions and the Madness of Crowds, by Charles Mackay, first published in 1841. That was also a favorite book of Bernard Baruch, a stock trader and close friend of Livermore.

He enjoyed fishing and, in 1937, he caught a 486-pound swordfish.

=== Marriages ===
Livermore was married three times and had two children. He married his first wife, Netit (Nettie) Jordan, of Indianapolis, at the age of 23 in October 1900. They had only known each other a few weeks before they got married. Less than a year later, he went broke after some bad trades. For a new stake, he asked her to pawn the substantial collection of jewelry he had bought her, but she refused, permanently damaging their relationship. They separated soon thereafter, but Livermore funded the defense of his brother-in-law, Chester S. Jordan, who was charged with murdering his wife. They finally divorced in October 1917.

On December 2, 1918, at the age of 40, Livermore married Dorothea "Dorothy" Fox Wendt, a former Ziegfeld girl in Ziegfeld Follies aged 22 or 23. Livermore had affairs with several of the dancers. The couple had two sons: Jesse Livermore II, born in 1919 and Paul, born in 1922. He then bought an expensive house in Great Neck and let his wife spend as much as she wanted on the furnishings. In 1927, he and his wife were burgled at gunpoint in their home. The relationship became strained by Dorothy's drinking habits, Livermore's affairs with other Ziegfeld girls, and their lavish spending. In 1931, Dorothy Livermore filed for divorce and took up temporary residence in Reno, Nevada, with her new lover, James Walter Longcope. On September 16, 1932, the divorce was granted and she immediately married her boyfriend. She retained custody of their two sons and received a $10 million settlement. Dorothy sold the house in Great Neck, on which Livermore spent $3.5 million, for $222,000. The house was then torn down, depressing Livermore.

On March 28, 1933, Livermore, then 56, married 38-year-old singer and socialite Harriet Metz Noble in Geneva, Illinois. They had met in 1931 in Vienna, where Metz Noble was performing and Livermore was in the audience on vacation. Metz Noble was from a prominent Omaha family that had made a fortune in the Metz Brewery Company. Livermore was Metz Noble's fifth husband; at least two of Metz's previous husbands had committed suicide, including Warren Noble, who hanged himself after the Wall Street crash of 1929.

== Publications ==
In late 1939, Livermore's son, Jesse Jr., suggested to his father that he write a book about trading. The book, How to Trade in Stocks, was published by Duell, Sloan and Pearce in March 1940. The book did not sell well as World War II was underway and the general interest in the stock market was low. His investment methods were controversial at the time, and the book received mixed reviews upon publication.

== Death ==
On Thanksgiving Day, November 28, 1940, just after 5:30 pm, Livermore fatally shot himself with a Colt automatic pistol in the cloakroom of the Sherry-Netherland hotel in Manhattan, where he usually had cocktails. Police found a suicide note of eight small handwritten pages in Livermore's personal, leather-bound notebook. The note was addressed to Livermore's wife, Harriet (whom Livermore nicknamed "Nina") and it read, "My dear Nina: Can't help it. Things have been bad with me. I am tired of fighting. Can't carry on any longer. This is the only way out. I am unworthy of your love. I am a failure. I am truly sorry, but this is the only way out for me. Love Laurie".
