= FT Press =

International book publisher

- Parent company: Pearson Education
- Headquarters location: Upper Saddle River, New Jersey (US)
- Nonfiction topics: General Business, Finance and Investing, Sales and Marketing, Leadership, Management Strategy, Human Resources, and Global Business
- Official website: www.ftpress.com

Financial Times Press in the United States and Financial Times Publishing in the United Kingdom are the book publishing imprints related to the Financial Times newspaper. The book imprints are owned by Pearson plc, a global publishing company which formerly also owned the newspaper. FT Press/Publishing creates books in the areas of General Business, Finance and Investing, Sales and Marketing, Leadership, Management and Strategy, Human Resources, and Global Business. FT Press is also the publishing partner for Wharton School Publishing.

When Financial Times was sold to Nikkei, Inc. in 2015, Pearson retained the book publishing imprints of FT and licensed the FT trademark from Nikkei.

FTPress.com is one of three websites of the InformIT Network. This site features free articles, blogs, and podcasts on business topics, as well as a bookstore carrying all FT Press and Wharton School Publishing titles in print and electronic formats. FT Press and Wharton School Publishing books are also available in searchable online format from Safari Books Online.
