= Richard Dennis =

American commodities speculator

Richard J. Dennis, a commodities speculator once known as the "Prince of the Pit," was born in Chicago, in January, 1949. In the early 1970s, he borrowed $1,600 and reportedly made $350 million. When a futures trading fund under his management incurred significant losses in the stock market crash of 1987 he retired from trading for several years. He has been active in Democratic and Libertarian political causes, most notably in campaigns against drug prohibition.

== Career ==
Dennis became an order runner on the trading floor of the Chicago Mercantile Exchange at age 17. A few years later, he began trading for his own account at the MidAmerica Commodity Exchange, an entry-level floor where "mini" contracts were traded. To circumvent a rule requiring traders to be at least twenty-one years of age, he worked as his own runner, and hired his father, who traded in his stead in the pit.

Dennis earned a bachelor's degree in philosophy from DePaul University, then accepted a scholarship for graduate study in philosophy at Tulane University, but then changed his mind, and returned to trading. He borrowed $1,600 from his family, which after spending $1,200 on a seat at the MidAmerica Commodity Exchange left him $400 in trading capital. In 1970, his trading increased this to $3,000, which he described as "compared to $400 ... a real grubstake", and in 1973 his capital was over $100,000. He made a profit of $500,000 trading soybeans in 1974, and by the end of that year was a millionaire, just short of twenty-six years of age.

Dennis profited, as he bought successively new weekly and monthly highs in the trending inflationary markets of the 1970s, an era of repeated crop failures and the "Great Russian Grain Robbery" of 1972, when agents of the Soviet Union secretly purchased 30% of the U.S. wheat crop in the space of a few weeks. This set the stage for solid, sustained price trends in both directions for the next several years, a period in which "anyone with a simple trend-following method and a dart board could make a million dollars".

In contrast to the vast majority of floor traders, who quickly scalped trades throughout a trading day, Dennis held positions for longer periods—riding out short-term fluctuations and holding over the intermediate term. Dennis often pyramided his positions. In the late 1970s, he bought a full membership at the more expensive Chicago Board of Trade and opened an office upstairs in order to trade more markets.

Dennis believed that successful trading could be taught. To settle a debate on that point with William Eckhardt, a friend and fellow trader, Dennis recruited and trained 21 men and two women, in two groups, one from December 1983, and the other from December 1984. Dennis trained this group, known as Turtles, for only two weeks about a simple trend-following system, trading a range of commodities, currencies, and bond markets, buying when prices increased above their recent range, and selling when they fell below their recent range. They were taught to cut position size during losing periods and to pyramid aggressively—up to a third or a half of total exposure, although only 24% of total capital would be exposed at any one time. This type of trading system will generate losses in periods when the market is rangebound, often for months at a time, and profits during large market moves.

Some of the recruited turtles:

- Michael Carr
- Michael Cavallo
- Elizabeth Cheval
- James DiMaria
- Curtis Faith
- Jeff Gordon
- Philip Lu
- Lucy Wyatt Mattinen
- Stig Ostgaard
- R. Jerry Parker
- Brian Proctor
- Paul Rabar
- Russell J. Sands
- Howard Seidler
- Michael Shannon
- Tom Shanks
- Craig Soderquist
- Jiri 'George' Svoboda

In January 1984, following a two-week training program, Dennis provided each of the "Turtles" with a trading account to apply the strategies they had been taught. During this initial one-month trading period, participants were permitted to trade up to 12 contracts per market. After the trial period, those who successfully implemented the system were allocated accounts to manage, with amounts ranging from $250,000 to $2 million of Dennis's personal funds.

When his experiment ended five years later, his Turtles reportedly had earned an aggregate profit of $175 million. The exact system taught to the Turtles by Dennis has been published in at least two books and can be back-tested to check its performance in recent years. The result of such back-test shows a drastic drop in performance after 1986, and even a flat performance from 1996 to 2009. However, a number of turtles (e.g., Jerry Parker of Chesapeake Capital, Liz Cheval of EMC, Paul Rabar of Rabar Market Research, Tom Shanks of Hawksbill Capital Management, Howard Seidler of Saxon Investment Corporation, Jim DiMaria of JPD Enterprises, Inc.) began and continued careers as successful commodity trading managers, using techniques similar, but not identical, to the Turtle System.

Dennis managed pools of capital for others in the markets for a while, but withdrew from such management in the spring of 1988 after his clients suffered heavy losses. In the Black Monday stock market crash of 1987, he reportedly lost $10 million, with a total of $50 million reportedly lost in 1987–1988. In 1990 his firm settled investor complaints of his failure to follow his own rules, for over $2.5 million, without admitting or denying any wrongdoing. He also managed funds for some time in the mid and late 1990s, closing these operations after losses in the summer of 2000.

He is the president of the Dennis Trading Group Inc. and the vice-chairman of C&D Commodities, a former chairman of the advisory board of the Drug Policy Alliance, a member of the board of directors of the Cato Institute, and on the board of trustees of the Reason Foundation.
