= Jack D. Schwager =

American financial trader and author (born 1948)

- Born: 1948
- Occupations: Author, Investment manager

Jack Schwager (born 1948) is an American financial trader and author. His books include Market Wizards (1989), The New Market Wizards (1992), Stock Market Wizards (2001) and Unknown Market Wizards: The Best Traders You’ve Never Heard Of (2020). He is a well-known author, fund manager and an industry expert in futures and hedge funds. He's published a number of books, such as Market Wizards.

== Biography ==
He holds a BA in Economics from Brooklyn College (1970) and an MA in Economics from Brown University (1971).

He is currently the co-portfolio manager for the ADM Investor Services Diversified Strategies Fund, a portfolio of futures and FX managed accounts. He is also an adviser to Catalytic Investment Group Pte Ltd, a Singapore-based fund management company, for their multi-manager multi-strategy fund. Previously, he was a partner in the Fortune Group, a London-based hedge fund advisory firm, which specialized in creating customized hedge fund portfolios for institutional clients. His prior experience includes 22 years as Director of Futures research for some of Wall Street's leading firms and 10 years as the co-principal of a Commodity Trading Advisor.

He has written extensively on the futures industry and great traders in all financial markets. He is perhaps best known for his best-selling series of interviews with the greatest hedge fund managers of the last two decades: Market Wizards (1989), The New Market Wizards (1992), and Stock Market Wizards (2001). The fourth book in the series, Hedge Fund Market Wizards, was released in May 2012.

Schwager's first book, A Complete Guide to the Futures Markets (1984) is considered to be one of the classic reference works in the field.

== Books ==
Name of Book	Year Published	Comments
A Complete Guide to the Futures Markets	1984	
Market Wizards: Interviews with Top Traders	1989	6 volume series: Book 1 of 6
The New Market Wizards: Conversations with America's Top Traders	1992	6 volume series: Book 2 of 6
Schwager on Futures: Consisting of Fundamental Analysis	1995	3 volume series: Book 1 of 3
Schwager On Futures: Technical Analysis	1996	3 volume series: Book 2 of 3
Schwager on Futures: Managed Trading	1996	6 volume series: Book 2 of 6
Getting Started in Technical Analysis	1999	
Stock Market Wizards: Interviews with America's Top Stock Traders	2001	6 volume series: Book 3 of 6
Market Sense And Nonsense: How The Markets Really Work (And How They Don’t)	2012	
Hedge Fund Market Wizards: How Winning Traders Win	2012	6 volume series: Book 4 of 6
The Little Book Of Market Wizards: Lessons From The Greatest Traders	2014	Series: Little Books. Big Profits
Unknown Market Wizards: The Best Traders You’ve Never Heard Of	2020	6 volume series: Book 5 of 6
Market Wizards: The Next Generation	2026	6 volume series: Book 6 of 6
