= Conscience-in-Media Award =

Journalism award

- Awarded for: Honoring "those who have demonstrated singular commitment to the highest principles of journalism at notable personal cost or sacrifice."
- Location: New York, New York
- Country: United States
- Presented by: American Society of Journalists and Authors
- First award: 1975
- Final award: 2018
- Website: asja.org/For-Writers/ASJAs-Annual-Writing-Awards/Awards-Recipients/Conscience-In-Media

The Conscience-in-Media Award is presented by the American Society of Journalists and Authors (ASJA) to journalists that the society deems worthy of recognition for their distinctive contributions. The award is not given out often, and is awarded to those journalists which the ASJA feels have demonstrated integrity to journalistic values, while enduring personal costs to themselves. Candidates are decided by an initial vote of the ASJA's First Amendment Committee, which must then be confirmed by a separate vote of the ASJA's board of directors.

The award has been presented twelve times since the first award was given in 1975. Notable recipients have included Jonathan Kozol, for work researching homelessness while writing his book Rachel and Her Children, Richard Behar and Paulette Cooper, for separate pieces investigating the Church of Scientology, and Anna Rosmus, for her investigation into the Nazi history of her hometown in Passau, Germany. In 2005, the committee voted to present the award to Judith Miller, but this vote was later overturned by a unanimous decision of the board.

== History ==
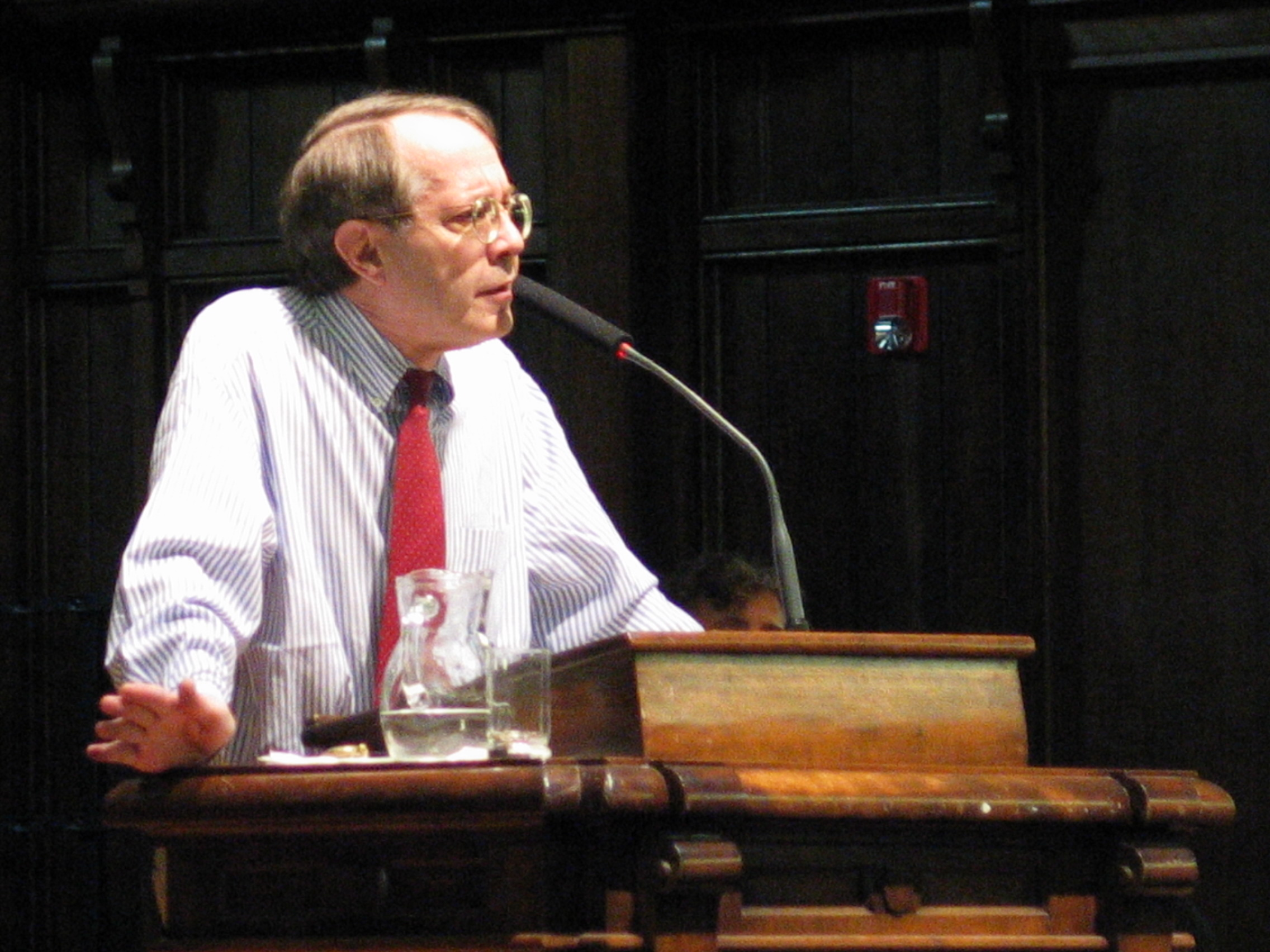
Jonathan Kozol, recipient of the 1988 award

The award is given by the ASJA, to recognize "distinctive contributions by any journalist in any medium". The first award was given to Jerald F. terHorst in 1975, and in total the award has been presented twelve times. The award criteria are stringent. The American Society of Journalists and Authors maintains that those honored must have knowingly taken risks in the course of researching their story, going beyond the normal call of duty. Specifically, the award is given: "for singular commitment to the highest principles of journalism at notable personal cost".

Jonathan Kozol was honored with the 1988 award, for work done on his book Rachel and Her Children: Homeless Families in America. In order to research the plight of homeless people in New York City, Kozol spent the majority of a winter season at the Martinique Hotel in Manhattan, where he grew close with the residents of the government subsidized shelter. During his time spent learning about the experiences of the homeless, he most empathized with homeless mothers - who constantly fear that sickness, poverty or intervention from the state of New York will result in the loss of their children. Kozol attempted to analyze the causes of homelessness, and to provide an estimate of what the future would be for the homeless.

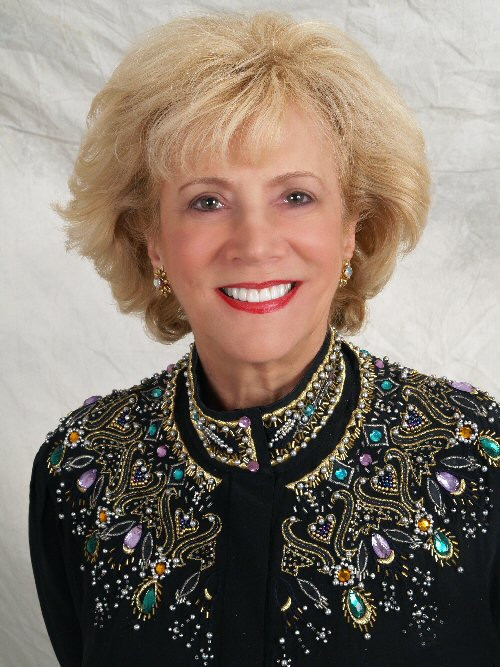
Paulette Cooper received the 1992 award along with Richard Behar.

1992 was the first time in ASJA history in which two writers were honored in the same year. The AJSA had already decided to honor investigative journalist Richard Behar, for his Time magazine article about the Church of Scientology: "The Thriving Cult of Greed and Power". Paulette Cooper, a longtime member of the ASJA, had also written about Scientology in her book The Scandal of Scientology, and was the subject of a "fair game" tactic that the Church of Scientology Guardian's Office called "Operation Freakout". As the award was not in existence at the time Cooper wrote her book, the ASJA decided that recognizing Cooper at the same time as Behar emphasized the commitment and courage both writers imbued in the face of risk to themselves.

Anna Rosmus received the 1994 award, in honor of work related to her research on the Nazi past of her hometown in Bavaria. Rosmus researched anti-Semitism, and opposed neo-Nazis and the extreme right in Germany. She also located and published artwork of Jews that had once lived in her hometown of Passau, Germany. As a result of her work, Rosmus endured threats against her life. In a 1996 Yom HaShoah ceremony, Rosmus recounted threats she faced after conducting her research: "Once-friendly neighbors threatened me openly - on the telephone, in person, in letters ... They threatened to kill me and kidnap my children. Some even attacked me physically, a room where I was to speak in Munich was bombed just before I was to be there, and several times I was sued. Nobody ever claimed I had said anything false or made mistakes. They just claimed all this would damage their reputations." Rosmus was profiled on 60 Minutes, and her story was the subject of the 1990 West German drama film, The Nasty Girl. Rosmus was presented with the Conscience-in-Media Award in a special ceremony at the United States Holocaust Memorial Museum.

In 2005, the ASJA's First Amendment Committee narrowly voted to present Judith Miller with the award, in recognition of her dedication to protecting sources. However, the full board of the ASJA later voted not to accept the decision of its committee, due to its opinion that her career as a whole and her actions in the Valerie Plame CIA leak case had cast doubt on her merits. ASJA president Jack El-Hai stated that the ASJA board's vote to reject the committee's recommendation had been unanimous. This decision sparked controversy, and Jack El-Hai received correspondence both praising the board for its decision, and accusing it of various political motives.

In 2015 three freelance journalists, James Foley, Steven Sotloff, and Austin Tice were honored with the award, presented at the National Press Club. "These three men represent the highest values of journalism: courage, sacrifice and a firm commitment to the truth", said Randy Dotinga, president of ASJA. "Their bravery and dedication are especially inspiring to us as fellow independent writers."

In 2018 the award was bestowed upon Daphne Caruana Galizia, an influential Maltese journalist, who had been threatened numerous times because of her investigative writing about people in high places, and in 2017 was murdered by a bomb placed under her car seat. "In her search for truth and tenacity in presenting it to the public, Daphne Caruana Galizia exemplifies the criteria for the Conscience in Media award", says Sherry Beck Paprocki, ASJA president.

== Award recipients ==
Honoring: "those who have demonstrated singular commitment to the highest principles of journalism at notable personal cost or sacrifice."

— American Society of Journalists and Authors

- 2018 - Daphne Caruana Galizia, for 30 years an investigative journalist, writer, and anti-corruption activist murdered in her native Malta on October 16, 2017
- 2015 - James Foley, Steven Sotloff, Austin Tice, freelance journalists killed or captured in the Middle East
- 1994 - Anna Rosmus, real-life heroine of the film The Nasty Girl.
- 1992 - Richard Behar, associate editor, Time and author, "Scientology: The Cult of Greed" (Time, May 6, 1991).
- 1992 - Paulette Cooper, ASJA member and author, The Scandal of Scientology
- 1988 - Jonathan Kozol, author, Rachel and Her Children.
- 1981 - Jacobo Timerman, former Argentine editor-publisher
- 1981 - Erwin Knoll, editor, The Progressive
- 1978 - Donald Woods, South African expatriate journalist
- 1977 - Investigative Reporters and Editors
- 1977 - Don Bolles (posthumous award)
- 1976 - I.F. Stone
- 1975 - Jerald F. terHorst

Additional source
