= Richard Behar =

American investigative journalist

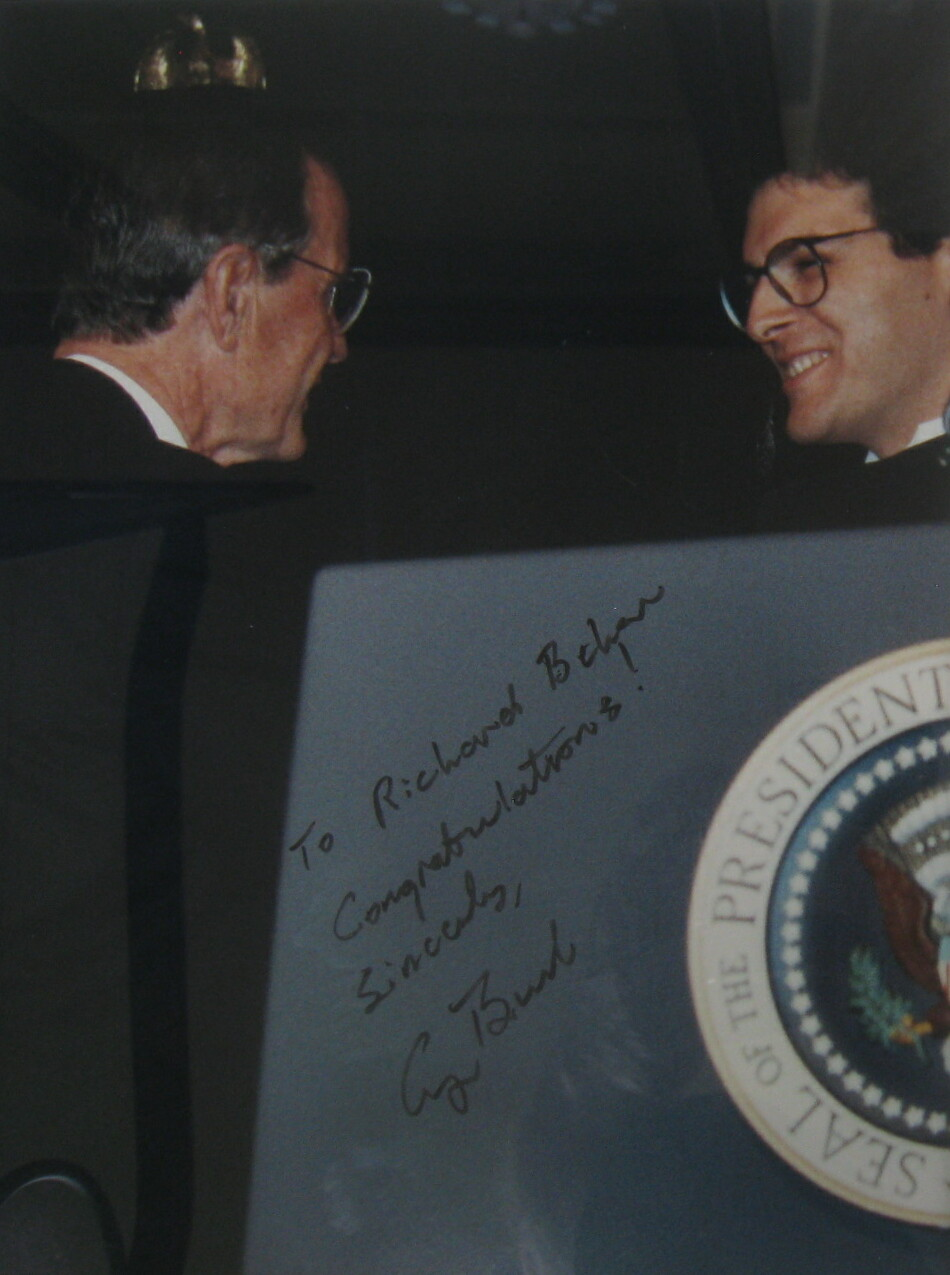
- Behar congratulated by President George H. W. Bush upon receiving Worth Bingham Prize
- Born: New York City, New York, U.S.
- Education: New York University
- Occupation: Investigative journalist
- Writing career
- Language: English
- Notable awards: Gerald Loeb Award, Conscience-in-Media Award, Worth Bingham Prize, George Polk Award, Overseas Press Club Award
- Website: www.richardbehar.com

Richard Behar is an American investigative journalist. Since 2012, he has been the Contributing Editor of Investigations for Forbes. From 1982 to 2004, he wrote on the staffs of Forbes, Time, and Fortune. Behar's work has also been featured on BBC, CNN, PBS, FoxNews.com, and Fast Company magazine. He is the author of the 2024 book Madoff: The Final Word, which details the Bernard Madoff fraud.

Behar was born to a Jewish family in Manhattan and raised on Long Island. He is a 1982 graduate of New York University. Before joining Time in 1989, he was a reporter and associate editor for Forbes magazine for six years. He has also worked at The New York Times as a researcher and writer. Behar reported extensively about organized crime and the business backgrounds of politicians for Time, for whom Behar wrote a 1993 cover story on the World Trade Center bombing.

In 1991, he wrote "The Thriving Cult of Greed and Power", a Time cover story on Scientology, which won several awards. The Church of Scientology brought several lawsuits over the article, all of which were eventually dismissed. While investigating the story, he experienced some of Scientology's fair game tactics. He later learned that a copy of his personal credit report, containing detailed personal information, had been improperly obtained.

A 2003 report by Behar in Fortune explored Donald Rumsfeld's role in helping North Korea build its potential Nuclear weapon capacity, in an article entitled "Rummy's North Korea Connection: What Did Donald Rumsfeld Know About ABB's Deal to Build Nuclear Reactors There? And Why Won't He Talk About It?" Behar is the only known journalist to have read the classified Phoenix Memo, the infamous pre-9/11 FBI document which warned the FBI about Osama bin Laden supporters enrolling in flight-training schools across the country. Reporting from Pakistan for Fortune magazine and CNN after 9-11, Behar's “The Karachi Connection” broke ground by exposing a logistics leader of the 9/11 attacks—including his secret travels near the Afghanistan border just days before the terror attacks. A second article, "Kidnapped Nation" revealed how radical forces are undermining Pakistan's economy.

In 2000 Behar penned an article published in Fortune titled "Capitalism in a Cold Climate" investigating the business practices of the billionaire brothers David and Simon Reuben in the aluminum and aluminum smelting business in the post-Soviet Russian Republic. Subsequently in June 2001, Behar and Time Inc. were sued for libel by the billionaire siblings, who built one of the world's largest aluminum companies, Trans-World Group. They claimed Behar defamed them in the article. Shortly before trial, in July 2004, the suit was settled after Fortune ran a lengthy "update and clarification."

In October 2004, Behar left Fortune to pursue book writing and various independent projects. In July 2005 he launched Project Klebnikov, described as a "global media alliance investigating" the July 2004, murder of Paul Klebnikov, who was then the editor-in-chief of Forbes Russia. Behar also served on the advisory committee of New York University's business journalism Master's program (BER), and wrote Madoff: The Final Word, a book about Bernard Madoff, which was published by Simon & Schuster in 2024. The book was initially purchased by Random House. During his research for the book, Behar exchanged emails with Madoff and also conducted three in-person prison interviews with him.

In 2015, Behar and journalist Gary Weiss co-founded The Mideast Reporter, subsequently known as Mideast Dig, a nonprofit news site and investigative journalism project. Its aim is to deepen news coverage of the Middle East. Weiss left the project in November 2015. It became inactive in 2018 due to lack of funding and closed in March 2025.

== Recognition ==
Behar has won more than 20 major journalism awards and honors for his reporting. They include:

- Four awards in recognition of his 1991 story for Time about Scientology:
1. Gerald Loeb Award for distinguished business and financial journalism in a magazine(1992)
2. Conscience-in-Media Award from the American Society of Journalists and Authors (1992) "for singular commitment to the highest principles of journalism at notable personal cost"
3. Worth Bingham Prize (1992)
4. Cult Awareness Network's Leo J. Ryan Award
- George Polk Award (twice): One for his 1995 story about the strong-arm tactics used by the Allstate Insurance Co. against its own employees; a second Polk for a 2008 story about China's activities in sub-Saharan Africa
- Business Journalist of the Year Award from the City of London Corporation for articles about counterfeiting in China and organized crime in Russia's aluminum industry
- Daniel Pearl Award for post-9/11 journalism
- 2002 Morton Frank Award, Overseas Press Club for post-9/11 journalism in Pakistan
- 2008 Ed Cunningham Award, Overseas Press Club for China's activities in sub-Saharan Africa
- Jack Anderson Award (twice) for "Top Investigative Reporter of the Year" – 1997 and 1999
- National Headliner Award, as a member of the CNN Investigation Team, for "outstanding continuing coverage of attacks on America and their aftermath."
- SAPA award (Society of Publishers in Asia) for best feature writing for an in-depth account of the royal family of Brunei
- "Best of the Best" award in 2009 from the Society of American Business Editors and Writers (SABEW), for an article on China's business activities in sub-Saharan Africa.
- Fortune was awarded the National Magazine Award for public interest for two articles written by Behar on organized crime's influence in the garbage-hauling industry (1997)
- 2008 George Polk Award for articles in Fast Company
- In 2013, finalist for a Loeb award for a Forbes magazine article about Hess Oil's Russian mob problem.
