= Sam Antar =

Sam Antar may refer to:

- Sam M. Antar
- Sam E. Antar
