= Jacob Bellaert =

Dutch publisher (from 1483 to 1486)

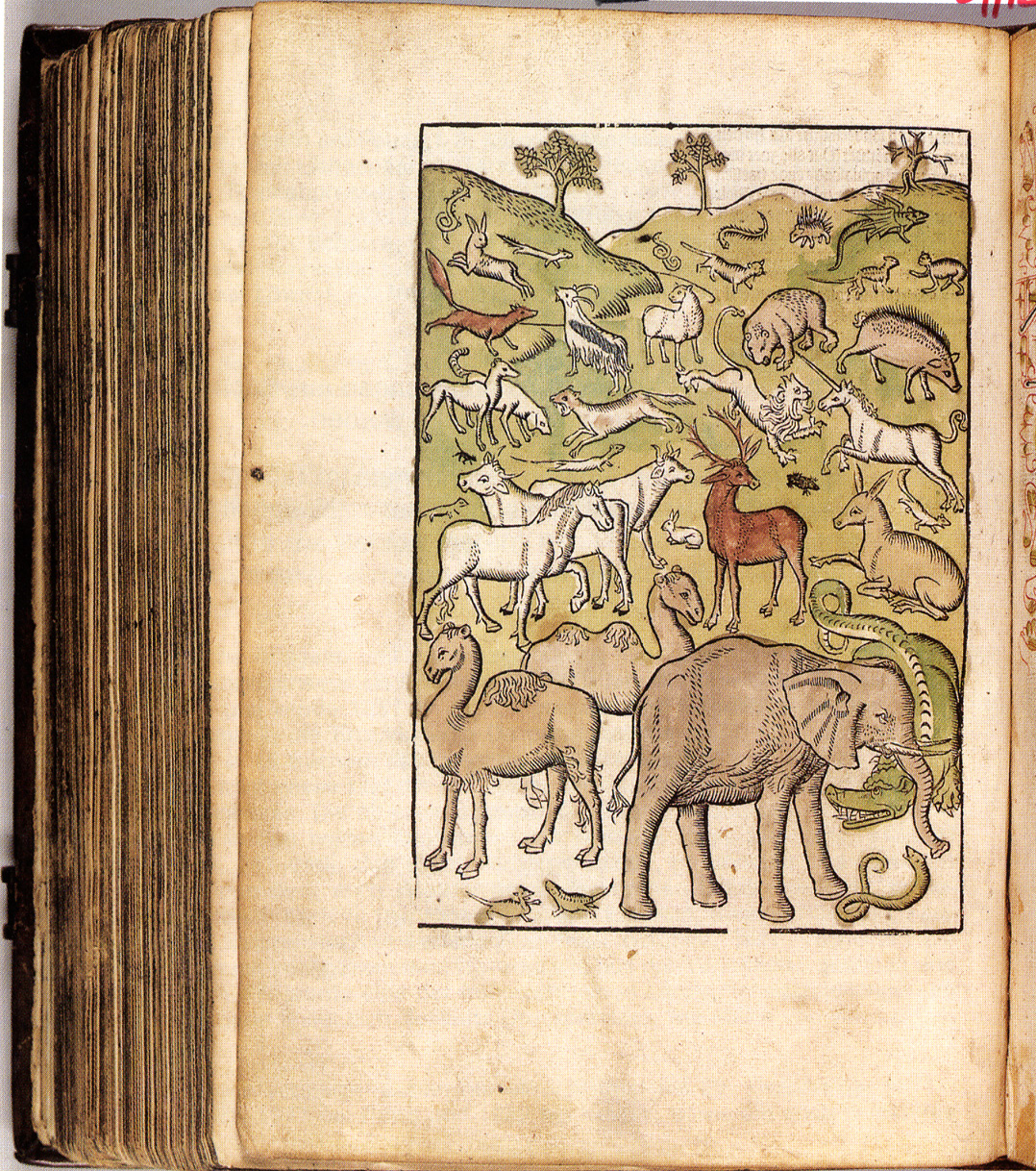
Illustration from Bartholomeus Anglicus's book Van de proprieteiten der dingen, 1484.

Jacob Bellaert (born in Zierikzee) was an early Dutch publisher who produced seventeen books in Haarlem from 1483 to 1486. The early Netherlandish painter Master of Bellaert or Master of Jacob Bellaert is so called for his many woodcuts in Bellaert's publications.

== Biography ==
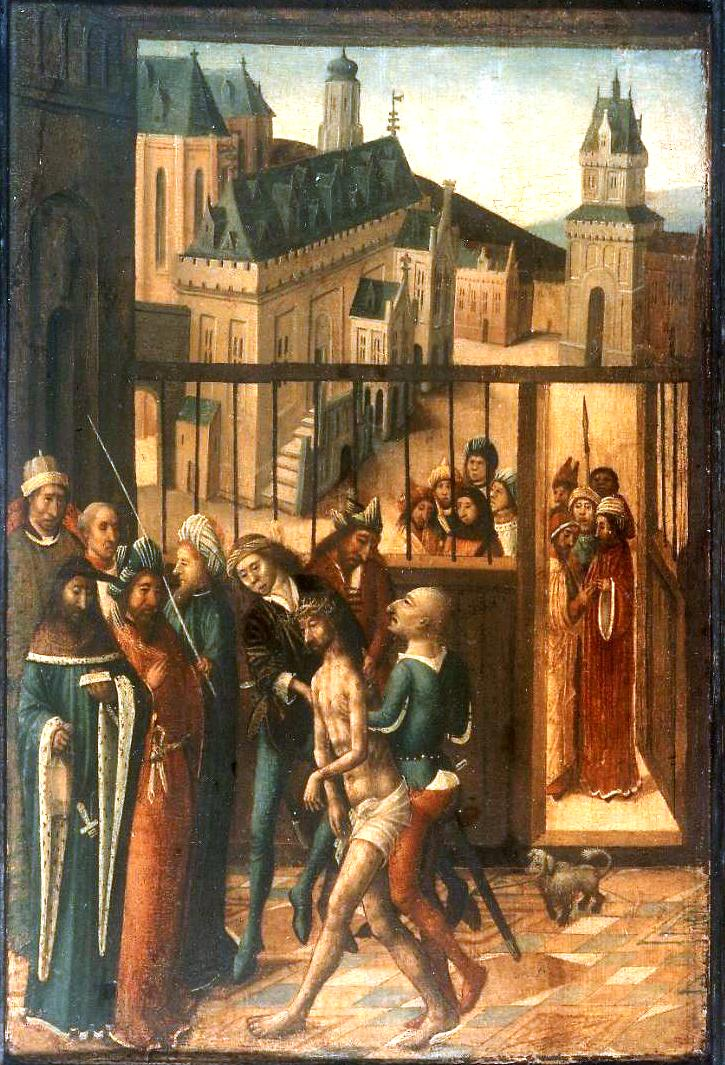
Christ before Pilate, by the Master of Bellaert, showing the Haarlem City Hall in the background.

Little is known of his life or that of his illustrator. According to the National Library of the Netherlands (KB), the edition of Der sonderen troest of het Proces tussen Belial ende Moyses is the only version of Jacobus de Teramo's story of Liber Bellial known to have been produced in Dutch. In his 1484 edition of Bartholomeus Anglicus's book Van de proprieteiten der dingen (English:"Of the propriety of things"), Jacob Bellaert printed his own name in the colophon, which is how his name survived.

According to the RKD the art historian W.R. Valentiner identified the illustrator as identical to the painter Albert van Ouwater and the Master of the Tiburtine Sibyl.

== Books ==
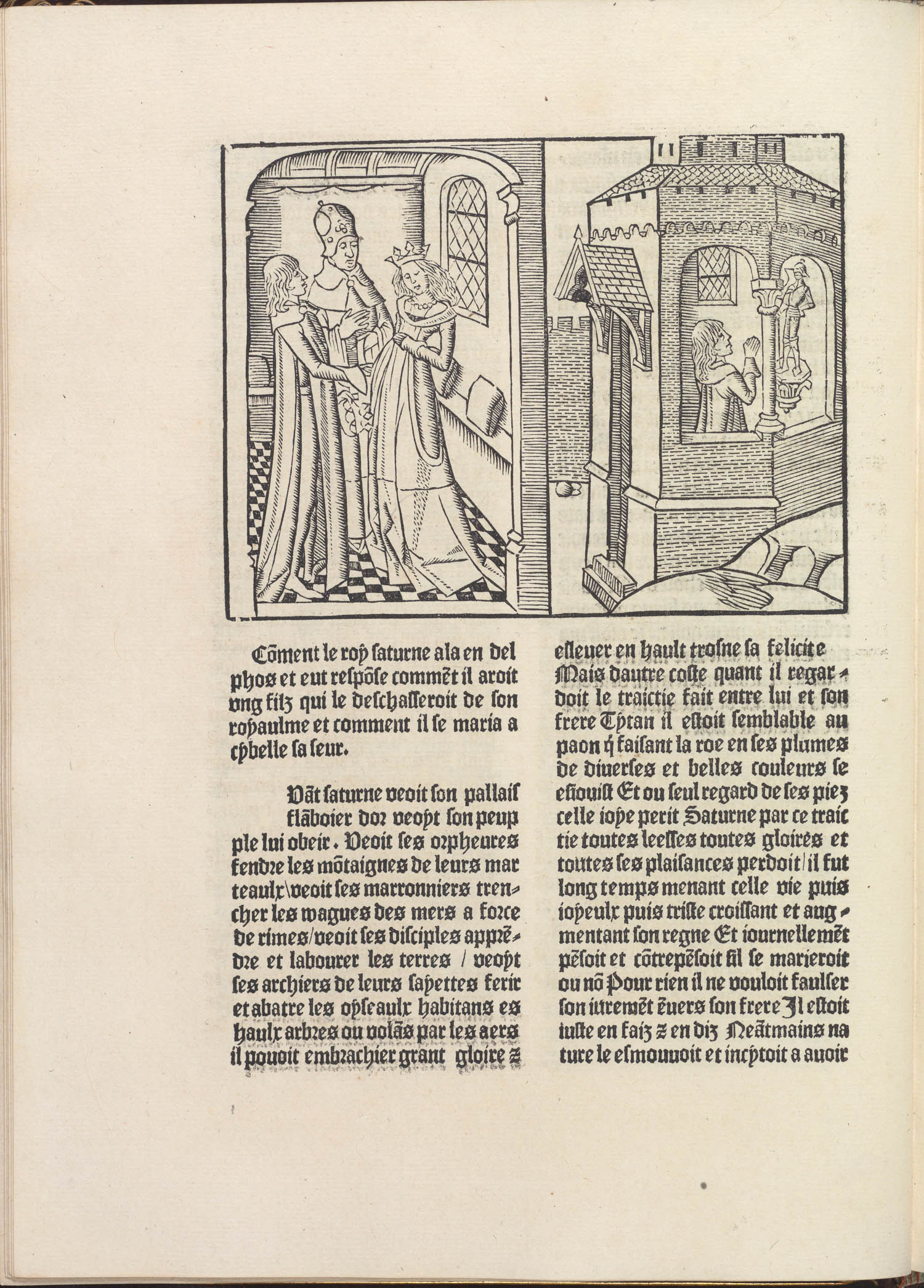
Recueil des histoires de Troyes by Raoul Le Fèvre, printed by Jacob Bellaert, 1485-1486.

- "Doctrinal du temps présent", by Pierre Michault, Jacob Bellaert, 24 juli 1486
- "Boek van den pelgrim", by Guillaume de Digulleville, Jacob Bellaert, 20 aug. 1486
- "Epistolae et Evangelia", by Jacob Bellaert, 8 April 1486
- "Le recueil des histoires de Troyes", Raoul Le Fèvre, Jacob Bellaert, 1485-1486.
- "Van den proprieteyten der dinghen", by Bartholomaeus Anglicus, van mi Meester Jacop Bellaert van Ziericzee, 24 December 1485
- "Der sonderen troest", by Jacobus van Theramo, Jacob Bellaert, 15 February 1484
- "De vier uitersten", by Gerardys de Vliederhoven, Jacob Bellaert, 12 November 1484
- "Der Sielen troest", by Johannes Moirs, Jacobus Bellaert, 9 August 1484
- "Summe le roy of des conincs summe. Ende leert hoe dat men de sonden biechten ende beteren sal", by Laurent d'Orléans, Jacob Bellaert, 31 May 1484
- "Boec des gulden throens of der xxiv ouden", by Otto von Passau, Jacop Bellaert, 25 October 1484
