= Leonard Mattioli =

American businessman and television personality

Leonard "Len" Mattioli, also known as TV Lenny and Crazy Lenny, is a businessman and former television personality in Madison, Wisconsin. He first got into television advertising in 1969, when he moved from New York to take over the American TV & Appliance electronics chain from his ailing brother, Ferdinand. He's widely known in the region for his outlandish ads that include water skiing on a sofa, blowing up a washing machine, or offering free bicycles with purchase. He also took over his brother's sponsorship of a local cult horror TV series, Ferdie’s Inferno, renaming it to Lenny's Inferno.

He stopped appearing in ads in 1998, and American TV went out of business in 2014.

After many years of running an e-bike dealership, Mattioli retired in 2022.

== See also ==
- Crazy Eddie
