= June Leavitt =

- יוני לויט
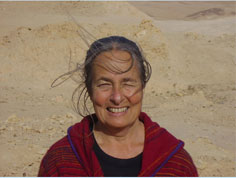
- June Leavitt
- Born: 1950 (age 75–76); New York, U.S.

June Leavitt (Hebrew: יוני לויט; born 1950, New York) is an American-Israeli scholar of Franz Kafka and author of a number of books, both academic and literary, including The Mystical Life of Franz Kafka: Theosophy, Cabala and the Modern Spiritual Revival, and Esoteric Symbols: The Tarot in Yeats, Eliot and Kafka.

== Career ==
Leavitt has published two novels: The Flight to Seven Swan Bay, for young adults, and Falling Star. Fragments of her autobiographical work, which first appeared in U.S. News & World Report, have been translated into Hebrew, French (as Vivre a Hebron), and German (as Hebron, Westjordanland: Im Labyrinth des Terrors).

Leavitt's memoir, Storm of Terror: A Hebron Mother's Diary documents her life and the lives of her family members and friends under terrorism in the West Bank, beginning in the year 2000 in the midst of Stage II of the First Intifada. The book received positive reviews in the Chicago Tribune (2002) and the Jewish Journal of Greater Los Angeles (2002). Leavitt's published diary entries and autobiographical writings led to a critical study of her work by Tamara Neuman in 2006 in a volume entitled, Struggle and Survival in the Modern Middle East.

Her articles and journalistic writings have been published in The New York Times and the U.S. News & World Report.

Leavitt's scholarly article, "The Influence of Medieval Rabbinical Commentators on the Countess of Pembroke" was first published in Notes and Queries (2003) and republished in Ashgate Critical Essays on Women Writers in England (2009). Her graduate research led to the publication of Esoteric Symbols: The Tarot in Yeats, Eliot and Kafka (2007) by the University Press of America, and The Mystical Life of Franz Kafka: Theosophy, Cabala and the Modern Spiritual Revival (2011) by Oxford University Press. Her most recent The Mystical Life of Franz Kafka: Theosophy, Cabala and the Modern Spiritual Revival has been called "original," "pathbreaking," and, according to the Times Literary Supplement, "Leavitt trawls [Kafka's] oeuvre to find examples of mystical experiences and out-of-body states".

In addition, Leavitt lectures on the subjects of Jewish mystical tradition and spirituality in literature at Ben-Gurion University of the Negev in Be'er Sheva, Israel and has been on the Mysticism Group board at the American Academy of Religion since 2006. From 2006 to 2009, Leavitt was an active member of the American Society of Journalists and Authors. She has lectured on the subjects of ancient Judaism, mystical experience, Cabala, the poetry of William Butler Yeats and T.S. Eliot, and the works of Franz Kafka in South Carolina, Chicago, Boston, Atlanta, and New York at various institutes and universities.

== Personal life ==
Leavitt has five children and lives with her husband in Kiryat Arba.

== Publications ==
=== Books ===
==== Non-fiction ====
- Leavitt, June (2002). Storm of Terror: A Hebron Mother's Diary. Lanham, Maryland: Ivan R. Dee. pp. 160. ISBN 978-1566634670.
- Leavitt, June (2007). Esoteric Symbols: The Tarot in Yeats, Eliot and Kafka. Lanham, Maryland: University Press of America. ISBN 978-0761836742.
- Leavitt, June (2011). The Mystical Life of Franz Kafka: Theosophy, Cabala and the Modern Spiritual Revival. New York: Oxford University Press. ISBN 978-0199827831.

==== Novels ====
- Leavitt, June (1985). The Flight to Seven Swan Bay. Nanuet, New York: Feldheim. ISBN 978-0873063876. (1985)
- Falling Star.
  - Republished as כוכב נופל (in Hebrew). Tel Aviv: Aviv Publishing. 1999.

=== Articles ===
- Leavitt, June (2003). "The Influence of Medieval Rabbinical Commentators on the Countess of Pembroke". Notes and Queries. doi:10.1093/nq/500401a.
  - Republished as Leavitt, June (2009). "The Influence of Medieval Rabbinical Commentators on the Countess of Pembroke". Ashgate's Critical Essays on Women Writers in England. 1550-1700. Vol. 2.
