= Anna Rosmus =

German author and researcher in German history

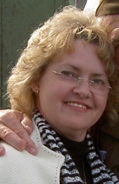
- Born: 29 March 1960 (age 66); Passau
- Occupation: Writer
- Writing career
- Language: German language
- Notable awards: Geschwister-Scholl-Preis, Conscience-in-Media Award

Anna Rosmus, also known as Anja Rosmus-Wenninger, is a German author and researcher born in 1960 in Passau, Bavaria.

== Early life and research ==
As a 16-year-old, Rosmus started developing an interest in contemporary history, especially that of the Third Reich, a subject that was barely mentioned at school. Encouraged by her father, a principal, she participated in a national essay contest that addressed the history of her city during the pre-war years. Some prominent residents claimed that the community remained untouched by the war and others praised themselves for their alleged political resistance against the dictatorship. Rosmus uncovered newspaper clippings and other archival material showing that local leaders and members of the town's prominent families were active members of the Nazi Party long before the war, and had helped to round up the town's roughly 400 Jews to send to concentration camps. Her essay, "My Hometown During the Third Reich", won a prize.

Rosmus' efforts were not welcomed by many inhabitants but at the age of 20, she continued with her research. Upon further questioning of some of Passau's elders, Rosmus found a conspiracy of silence and refusal to provide information. After three years of perseverance and litigation, she was finally granted access to the city administration's archives. She found that several concentration-, forced labor- and prisoner-of-war camps had been built in and around the city.

Rosmus wrote her first book, Resistance and Persecution - The Case of Passau 1933–1939 which was published in 1983. Undeterred by threats, she wrote Exodus - In the Shadow of Mercy a book focusing on the plight of Passau's Jews during the twentieth century. Her work continued to cause unprecedented uproar as well as international praise.

== The Nasty Girl and major TV productions ==
- In 1985, Rosmus' work attracted director Michael Verhoeven's attention. He wrote and directed Das schreckliche Mädchen (The Nasty Girl), a 1990 film in which Lena Stolze plays Sonja Wegmus, a fictional version of Rosmus. The movie received the BAFTA Award for Best Film not in the English Language, and it was nominated for the Academy Award for Best Foreign Language Film in 1991.
- In 1986, the German TV station ARD broadcast Felix Kuballa's WDR 45-min documentary Von deutscher Toleranz.
- In 1988, the German TV station ARD showed Henning Stegmüller's 1987 Radio Bremen 90-min documentary Gegen den Strom about Anna Rosmus.
- In 1990, the German TV station ZDF showed Michael Verhoeven's 1987 documentary Das Mädchen und die Stadt about Anna Rosmus.
- 1994/95, Felix Kuballa (WDR) produced the documentary Das Schreckliche Mädchen in Amerika. ARD featured 60-min and a 45-min versions.

== Emigration to the United States ==
In August 1994, after constant harassment and death threats from the local community, Rosmus and her daughters moved to the United States. They settled in the Washington, D.C., area. Since her youngest daughter's graduation from high school, Rosmus has lived near Chesapeake Bay in Maryland.

Her research resulted in numerous presentations, including:

- Filling in the Void, The Last Phase of Survivor Literature, Ben Gurion University, Beersheba, Israel, 1996
- Pocking's Buried Secrets, Teaching the Holocaust Conference in Augsburg, Germany, 1997
- Austrian-German Conspiracies at a Centuries-old Bishopric. A look back, 60 Years after the Conquest of Austria, 28th Scholars' Conference on the Churches and the Holocaust, Seattle, Washington, 1998
- The Passau Theater Scandal, German Studies Association Conference, Salt Lake City, UT, 1998
- European Response to Northern American Memorials, Teaching the Holocaust Conference, Ottawa, Ontario, Canada, October 1998
- Franz Schrönghamer-Heimdal: The Honorable?, 29th Scholars’ Conference on the Churches and the Holocaust, New York, New York, March 8, 1999;
- The Presence of the Absence, International Holocaust Conference for Eyewitnesses & Descendants, Vienna, Austria, 1999
- The Pre-Nazi Town that Chose a Jewish Sex Symbol: Gender, Anti-Semitism, and Politics in Passau, 1919–1929, German Studies Association Conference, Atlanta, Ga., 1999
- My Jewish Mission. One German Woman’s Search for the Truth, Nuremberg & beyond, Columbia, South Carolina, 1999
- The Future of Germany’s Past, Holocaust Conference, Millersville, Pennsylvania, 2000
- 1919–1929, The Sexual Revolution of the Twentieth Century, Old Dominion University, Norfolk, Virginia, 2000
- The Truth about Passau, German Studies Association Conference, Houston, Texas, 2000
- The Nasty Girl and its Aftermath, Association of Holocaust Organizations’ Winter Seminar, USHMM, in Washington, D.C., 2001
- From Reality to Fiction, The European Studies Consortium, University of Minnesota, Minneapolis, 2001
- Growing up where Hitler Lived. The Courage to Speak the Truth, at: Connecting Biography and Research: Personal Revelations of Female Academics who Deal with the Subject of Extreme Violence and Death, Annual Conference of Canadian Universities Laval University, Quebec City, Canada, Congress 2001
- Where Hitler Used to Live: Post-Holocaust Pocking and Passau, Fourth International Biennial Conference. Deterring and Preventing Genocide: Missed Opportunities, Contemporary Issues and Future Possibilities, Association of Genocide Scholars, at the University of Minnesota, 2001
- Rabbi Lazar Salzberg and the Passauer Neue Presse, German Studies Association Conference, Washington, D.C., October 5, 2001
- Murder of the Innocent, Annual meeting of the European History Section of the Southern Historical Association, New Orleans, 2001
- The Oswald Ring. Educators who Demand that Higher Education Must be Avoided, 32nd Scholars’ Conference on the Churches and the Holocaust, Kean University in Newark, New Jersey, 2002
- Diplomacy and Terrorism: The German-Afghani Connection. Closing Luncheon Address, 32nd Scholars’ Conference on the Churches and the Holocaust, Kean University in Newark, N.J., 2002
- Erich Mühsam and the “Godforsaken Border Town of Passau”. An Arrest that Reflected the Past as Much as it was Foreboding the Future, Jewish Culture - Western Civilization - and Beyond, Old Dominion University, Norfolk, Va., 2002
- Rudolph Freiherr von Moreau: The Making of a Hero, 33rd Scholars’ Conference on the Churches and the Holocaust, Philadelphia, Pa., 2003
- "Useless Consumers of Food", Sixth Holocaust Studies Conference, Middle Tennessee State University, Murfreesboro, Tennessee, 2003
- Supplementing the “Aryan” Race, Annual Conference of the Canadian Federation of Humanities and Social Sciences, Winnipeg, Manitoba, Canada, Congress 2004
- Choosing Murder to Re-establish a Glorious Past. From Atta to Arco: Hating Democracy, 34th Scholars’ Conference on the Churches and the Holocaust, Newark, N.J., 2005
- Back to the Home Front, Annual Congress of the Canadian Federation of Humanities and Social Sciences, University of Western Ontario, London, Ontario, Canada, June 2, 2005
- Turning The Masses into Ethnic Warriors, Redefining The Political Nature of Borderline Identities, Concordia University, Montreal, Quebec, Canada, CASCA Conference, May 12, 2006
- Family Matters: Rape and Incest in SA and SS: Congress of the Humanities and Social Sciences, York University, Toronto, Ontario, Canada, June 3, 2006
- Nazi-Era Deployments of Bavarian Folk Tales, CASCA-AES Conference, University of Toronto, Canada, May 10, 2007
- Manifestations of National Identity in “The Nasty Girl”, Congress of the Humanities and Social Sciences, University of Saskatchewan, Saskatoon, Canada, 2007
- How to Avoid the Nuremberg Trials in Grand Style, 8th Holocaust Studies Conference, Middle Tennessee State University, Tenn., 2007
- Major General Ernst Nason Harmon: “Certain Jewish Shipments to Bavaria", Third International Multidisciplinary Conference, Imperial War Museum, London, England, January 9, 2009
- The “Angelic” Major General or: Cussing at the Prospect of Combat, Norfolk, Va., September 13, 2009

In 1994, Rosmus began to plan programs for a first tour with survivors and US Veterans of WWII in Germany and Austria. Since then, she has organized several reunions of veterans, survivors and locals in Europe.

Since 2009, Rosmus has been a member of the International Council of the Austrian Service Abroad.

== Publications ==
- Widerstand und Verfolgung am Beispiel Passau 1933–1945 (Resistance and Persecution—The Case of Passau 1933–1939), published by Andreas Haller in Passau, Germany, 1983.
- Leiden an Passau pp. 98–106 in: Lieben Sie Deutschland (Suffering from Passau in: Do You Love Germany),191 pages, published by Piper in Munich, Germany, 1985.
- Erwiderung (Response), pp. 143–147 in: Beunruhigung in der Provinz. 10 Jahre Scharfrichterhaus (Disturbance in the Province. 10 Years Executioner's House); edited by Walter Landshuter and Edgar Liegl, Andreas-Haller, Passau, Germany, 1987.
- Exodus - Im Schatten der Gnade. Aspekte zur Geschichte der Juden im Raum Passau. (Exodus. In the Shadow of Mercy.Aspects of Jewish History in the Passau Region), a book focusing on the plight of Passau's Jews during the twentieth century; 270 pages, published by Dorfmeister in Tittling, Germany, 1988.
- Zur braunen Chronik Passaus. Anmerkungen zur Zeit von 1919 bis 1933 (Brown-Shirted Passau Chronicles. Connotations about the Period from 1919 to 1933), pp. 6–10 in: Lichtung. Ostbayerisches Magazin in Viechtach, Germany, Nov/Dec 1989.
- Robert Klein. A German Jew Looks back, 112 pages, published in Passau, Germany, 1991.
- "Wintergrün - Verdrängte Morde" (Wintergreen - Suppressed Murders), 200 pages, Labhard, Konstanz, Germany, 1993.
- Wider das Vergessen (Against Forgetting), pp 31–34 in: Bayerischer Wald, edited by Hubert Ettl; Viechtach, Germany, 1993.
- Der Massenmord am “fremdvölkischen” Nachwuchs und die Folgen (Mass Murder of the Foreign Rising Generation and its Consequences), pp. 11–14 in: lichtung. ostbayerisches magazin; Viechtach, Germany, Sept/Oct. 1993.
- Was ich denke (What I Think),189 pages, published by Goldmann in Munich, Germany, 1995.
- Pocking - Ende und Anfang. Jüdische Zeitzeugen über Befreier und Befreite (Pocking - End and Renewal. Jewish Witnesses on Liberators and the Liberated), 201 pages, published by Labhard in Konstanz, Germany, 1995.
- Legacy of the 761st Tank Battalion, 100th Field Hospital, Baltimore, MD, February 11, 1996.
- Wenn nicht ich, wer dann? (If Not Me, Then Who?), pp 82–86 in: Wenn nicht ich, wer? Wenn nicht jetzt, wann? (If Not Me, Who? If Not Now, When?), edited by Christlich-Jüdischer Koordinierungsrat Deutschland, Bad Nauheim, Germany, 1998.
- A l’écran et avec une nomination aux Oscars" (On Screen, with an Oscar Nomination); in: "La Shoah: le témoignage impossible?(Shoah. The Impossible Testimony), published by Université de Bruxelles, Belgium, 1998.
- "Filling in the Void", in: Gelber, M. (ed.) Belated or Timely Memoirs? The Last Phase of Survivor Literature from the Holocaust, Syracuse University Press, Syracuse, NY, 1998.
- "Out of Passau. Von einer, die auszog, die Heimat zu finden" (Out of Passau.. By One Who Moved Out to Find the Homeland), 286 pages, published by Herder in Freiburg, Basel, Vienna, 1999.
- "Can we afford to stand by?" In: The Memory of the Holocaust in the 21st Century; CD-rom, Yad Vashem, Jerusalem, Israel, 1999.
- Murder of the Innocent, pp. 83–102 in: Hearing the Voices: Teaching the Holocaust to Future generations; edited by Michael Hayse, Didier Pollefeyt, G. Jan Colijn and Marcia Sachs Littell. Merion Westfield Press International, Merion Station, PA, 1999.
- From Reality to Fiction: Anna Rosmus as The “Nasty Girl”, pp 113–143 in: Religion and the Arts. A Journal from Boston College.Koninklijke Brill NV, The Netherlands; Leiden, Boston, Cologne, 2000.
- "A Troublemaker in a Skirt", pp 270–288 in: Second Generation Voices, Syracuse University Press, 2001.
- Pocking's Buried Secrets, pp. 207–226 in: “Building History: Art, Memory, and Myth”; McGill European Studies, published by Peter Lang, New York, Bern, Berlin, Bruxelles, Frankfurt/M., Oxford, Vienna, 2001.
- Murder of the Innocent. Foreign Slave Laborers and Forced Abortions in Bavaria, pp 139–158 in: Women in the Holocaust: Responses, Insights and Perspectives. Published by Merion Westfield Press International, Merion Station, Pennsylvania, 2002.
- The Challenge of Right-Wing Extremism for Democracy, pp. 103–107 in: How to Fight Right-Wing Extremism in Germany Today - The Role of Citizens, Civil Society, and the Government. Published by Friedrich Ebert Foundation in Washington DC, 2002.
- Against the Stream: Growing Up Where Hitler Used to Live, 160 pages, published by University of South Carolina Press, Columbia, SC, 2002.
- "Involuntary Abortions for Polish Forced Laborers", pp. 76–94 in: Experience and Expression: Women, the Nazis, and the Holocaust. Edited by Elizabeth R. Baer and Myrna Goldenberg, Wayne State University, Detroit, MI, 2003.
- "The Struggle Continues: Hate Crime in Germany Today", pp. 221– 237 in: Confront! Resistance in Nazi Germany; ed. Jahn Michalczyk, Peter Lang, New York, 2004.
- Out of Passau: Leaving a City Hitler Called Home, published by University of South Carolina Press, Columbia, SC, 2004.
- Wintergreen: Suppressed Murders, published by University of South Carolina Press, Columbia, SC, 2004.
- "In Search of the “Rosetta Stone”", Alma College, MI, April 1, 2009.
- Valhalla Finale, 350 pp, a photo book about the end of WWII in Bavaria, Czechoslovakia, Upper Austria and the US Army in 1945, published by Dorfmeister in Tittling, Germany, 2009.
- Ragnarök (http://www.pnp.de/ngen/PictureGallery/diashow1.php?name=rosmus-2010&titel=Ostbayern%20in%20der%20Nachkriegszeit), a photo book about the end of WWII in Bavaria, Czechoslovakia, Upper Austria and the US Army, 464 pp, published by Dorfmeister in Tittling, Germany, 2010.
- Hitlers Nibelungen: Niederbayern im Aufbruch zu Krieg und Untergang (Hitler's Nibelungs: Lower Bavaria at the Onset of War and Downfall), published by Simone Samples Verlag in Grafenau, Germany, 2015, ISBN 978-3-938401-32-3.

== Honors ==
- “Best German Writer”, for “Daten innerer und äußerer Freiheit aus Politik und Geschichte Europas” (Internal and External Freedoms taken from History and Politics in Europe) in the “Europäischer Aufsatz Wettbewerb” (European Essay Competition) in June 1980, Berlin/Paris.
- In 1984 Anna Rosmus received the "Geschwister-Scholl-Preis", a literary prize by the association of Bavaria's Publishers and the City of Munich, for she “has mustered the highly inconvenient courage to reject the ready-framed historical picture of her hometown.”
- Death mask of Kurt Tucholsky for civil courage and political commitment May 7, 1987, Hindås, Sweden.
- The “Holocaust Survivors & Friends in Pursuit of Justice” honored her in October 1992 with the Holocaust Memorial Award in Albany, N.Y.
- Legislative Resolution honoring “the tireless, courageous and often life-threatening efforts... against the acts and effects of racism, bigotry and hatred, remembering the warnings of a tragic and blackened history...to educate future generations“ by the State of New York, in October 1992.
- Elected Member of the International “PEN Club,” in December 1993.
- Honored by Temple Beth El in California on April 8, 1994, “in appreciation of the humanitarian efforts to educate the world about the history of the Holocaust.”
- Scott Kennedy, Mayor of Santa Cruz, California, proclaimed Sunday, April 10, 1994, as “Anna Rosmus Day” in the City of Santa Cruz, CA.
- She has received the Sarnat Prize from the Anti-Defamation League of B'nai B'rith for those who fight anti-Jewish bigotry, June 10, 1994, in New York City.
- The American Society of Journalists and Authors awarded Rosmus its Conscience-in-Media Award, honoring “those who have demonstrated singular commitment to the highest principles of journalism at notable personal cost or sacrifice,” It was presented in a special program at the U.S. Holocaust Memorial Museum in September 1994
- Tree-Dedication in front of “Temple Israel,” November 9, 1994, Albany, N.Y.
- The Holocaust Memorial Center in West Bloomfield, Michigan, honored Rosmus “in recognition of having exposed the facts about the role of Passau, Germany, during World War II and forcing its residents finally to confront the truth.”
- In 1996, the Heinz Galinski Prize, highest honor of the Jewish Community in Berlin, honored her “commitment characterized by understanding, tolerance and mutual respect; her espousal of peace and reconciliation; the sincere way she comes to grips with history and the past.” The jury's justification says, among other things: “In spite of the greatest difficulties and opposition that you were forced to confront again and again, you have rendered a very significant contribution to memory and enlightenment. Only when we remember do we have a chance of doing battle against neo-Nazism.”
- Listed in Marquis’ “Who’s Who of American Woman” (first time in the 1997/1998 edition).
- On March 20, 1998, the D.C. Chapter of the American Immigration Lawyers Association and the American Immigration Law Foundation honored her with the Immigrant Achievement Award as a “distinguished immigrant who through her extraordinary endeavors has made a substantial contribution to the United States of America and is a proud reflection of the values of this nation.”
- “Myrtle Wreath Award,” by Hadassah, “in recognition of selfless and fearless pursuit of the truth about the Holocaust,” March 30, 1995, Washington D.C.
- Elected honorary member of the 65th Infantry Division Association on September 8, 1995
- On February 11, 1996, the 4214th USAR Hospital honored her “enlightening research centered around the involvement of African Americans in Germany during WWII”.
- Listed in Marquis “Who’s Who in America” (first time in the 1996 edition).
- Listed in Marquis “Who’s Who in the World” (first time in the 1999 edition).
- Elected honorary member of the 71st Infantry Division Association, 2005
- Elected honorary member of the 11th Armored Division Association, 2008
- Honorary PhD, University of South Carolina, 2000
- Honorary PhD, Alma College, 2009

== See also ==
- Austrian Holocaust Memorial Service
- University of South Carolina
