= Mideast Dig =

Defunct nonprofit news website

Mideast Dig, formerly known as The Mideast Reporter, was a nonprofit news site and investigative journalism project. It was established in 2014 by Richard Behar and Gary Weiss to deepen news coverage of the Middle East. It described itself as, "completely nonpolitical, and not affiliated with any advocacy group."

Writing in The Jerusalem Post, historian Gil Troy described Mideast Reporter as, "the Mideast Politico." Behar described the venture's goal as "first-class investigative reporting, with a relentless focus on the Middle East," and said the site planned to expand coverage as funding permits.

Weiss left the venture in November 2015 and the site's name was changed to Mideast Dig. It became inactive in 2018 due to a lack of financial support and closed in March 2025.
