= Albert van Ouwater =

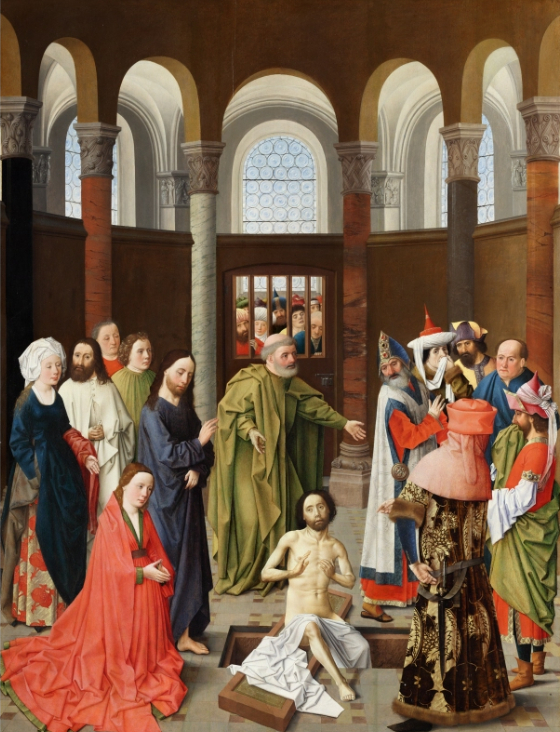
The Raising of Lazarus, Gemäldegalerie, Berlin, 1445

Albert van Ouwater (c. 1410/1415 – 1475) was one of the earliest artists of Early Netherlandish painting working in the Northern Netherlands, as opposed to Flanders in the South of the region.

== Biography ==
He was probably born in Oudewater, and is mentioned by Karel van Mander (1604) as a reputable painter at the time in which he lived. According to Karel van Mander he was possibly a contemporary of Jan van Eyck and had been the teacher of Geertgen tot Sint Jans, though he was quick to qualify this statement with the eye-witness account of an old man named Albert Simonsz who had been a pupil of Jan Mostaert and claimed neither he nor Mostaert had ever even heard of this Albert van Ouwater or Geertgen tot Sint Jans. Van Mander highly commends an altarpiece by Van Ouwater in the principal church in Haarlem, the Grotekerk or Sint-Bavokerk, representing St. Peter and St. Paul, in which the figures are carefully and correctly designed, and richly coloured. Van Mander posits Van Ouwater as the founder of the Haarlem school of painting, making him the first major Dutch (as opposed to Flemish) artist. According to Van Mander, landscape painting was a particular specialty of this Dutch school, although none of Van Ouwater's surviving works exhibit this tendency. Van Ouwater seems to have been a contemporary of Dirk Bouts in mid-15th-century Haarlem, and Geertgen tot Sint Jans may have been his pupil.

Van Mander describes another picture by Van Ouwater of a more extensive composition, the Resurrection of Lazarus, which had been taken by the Spaniards back to Spain after the siege of Haarlem as war booty, but which he saw the copy of that had been greatly admired by Maarten van Heemskerck. This has been identified as the painting now in the Staatliche Museen in Berlin. This is the only widely accepted attribution to Van Ouwater, although many scholars also credit him with the small, fragmentary Head of a Donor in the Metropolitan Museum of Art in New York. Max J. Friedländer also gave him a Virgin and Child (Metropolitan Museum of Art, New York), but this painting has also been associated with the early works of Dirk Bouts (the Metropolitan Museum now considers it the work of a German painter influenced by the Haarlem school). Less convincingly, Albert Châtelet adds a pair of altar wings with St. John the Baptist and St. Michael (both in the Capilla Real, Granada) to Van Ouwater's œuvre.

According to the RKD he was also known as Albertus Veteraquinas, and the art historian W.R. Valentiner identified him as identical to the painters Master of Bellaert and Master of the Tiburtine Sibyl.
