= Master of the Tiburtine Sibyl =

Early Netherlandish painter

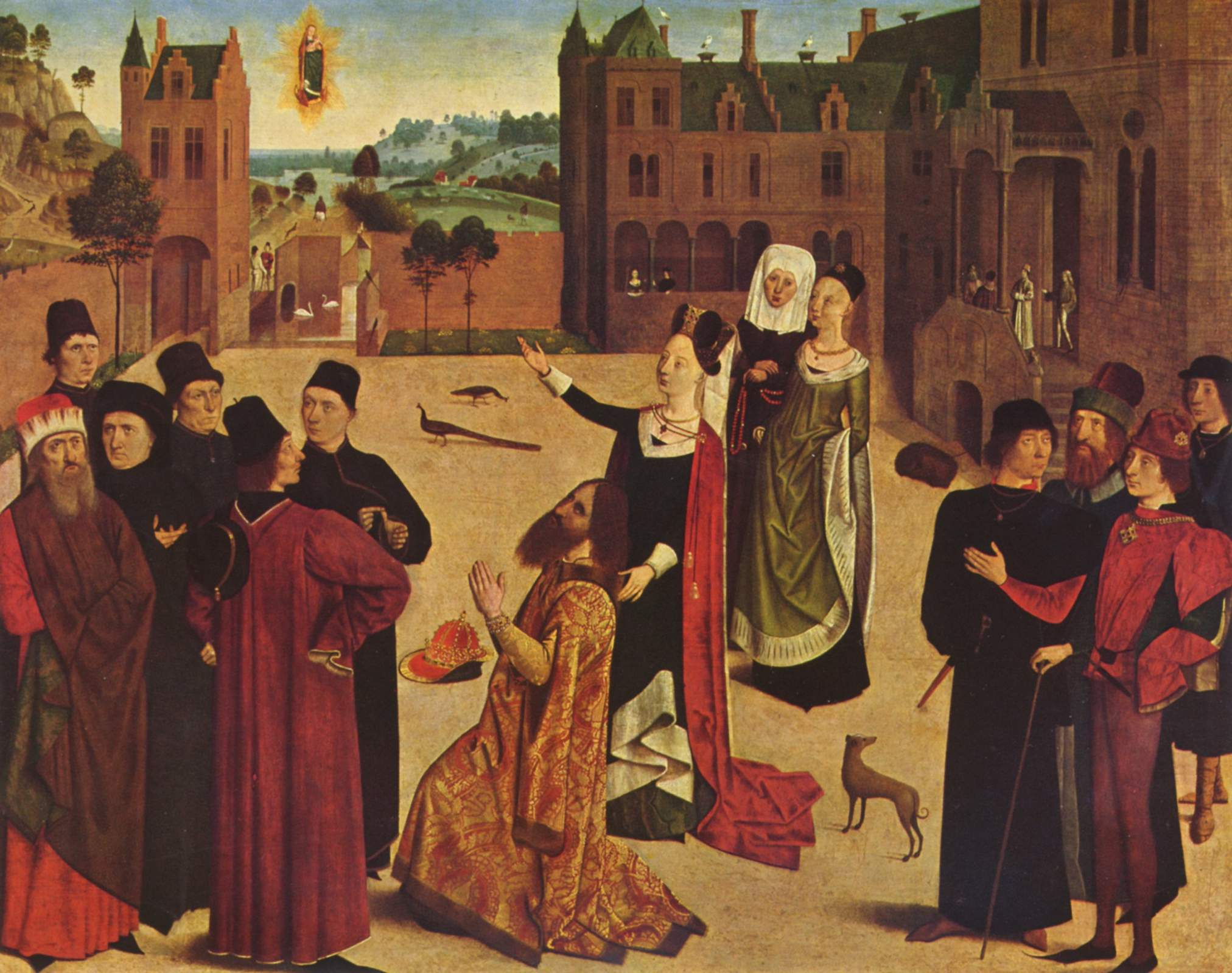
The Tiburtine Sibyl meets Augustus, now in the Städel

The Master of the Tiburtine Sibyl (fl. 1475–1495) was an unidentified Early Netherlandish painter, probably from Haarlem, named after The Tiburtine Sibyl meets Augustus, a work in the Städel in Frankfurt.

== Identification ==
The artist was first recognized and named by German art historian Max Jakob Friedländer, who specialized in Early Netherlandish painting. Speculation on which known painter he may be identified with has so far been fruitless. He is supposed to have been trained first in Leuven, probably with Dieric Bouts, and later in Haarlem, with some of his works, like the Tiburtine Sibyl, showing clear influences of Geertgen tot Sint Jans. Some works which were earlier attributed to the Master of the Tiburtine Sibyl are now attributed to unknown followers of Bouts. Art historian Wilhelm Valentiner identified the Master with Albert van Ouwater, but this identification is now rejected.

The Master of the Tiburtine Sibyl influenced some later painters like Gerard David, whose Arrest of Sisamnes shows clear resemblances to The Tiburtine Sibyl meets Augustus. Also some woodcuts by the early book illustrator, the Master of Jacob Bellaert, show clear influences of the Master of the Tiburtine Sibyl, with some authors even suggesting that they were the same artist.

== Works ==
- The Tiburtine Sibyl meets Augustus, c. 1475–1480, now in the Städel
- Resurrection of Lazarus, c. 1480, now in the Museo Nacional de San Carlos
- Crucifixion, c. 1485, in the Detroit Institute of Arts
- Kempen Altar, a triptych (with the central panel missing) depicting the Presentation of the Virgin when closed, and a Nativity and Circumcision of Christ when opened
- Marriage of the Virgin, now in the Philadelphia Museum of Art
- Madonna and Child and Ste Anne, now in the Princeton University Art Museum
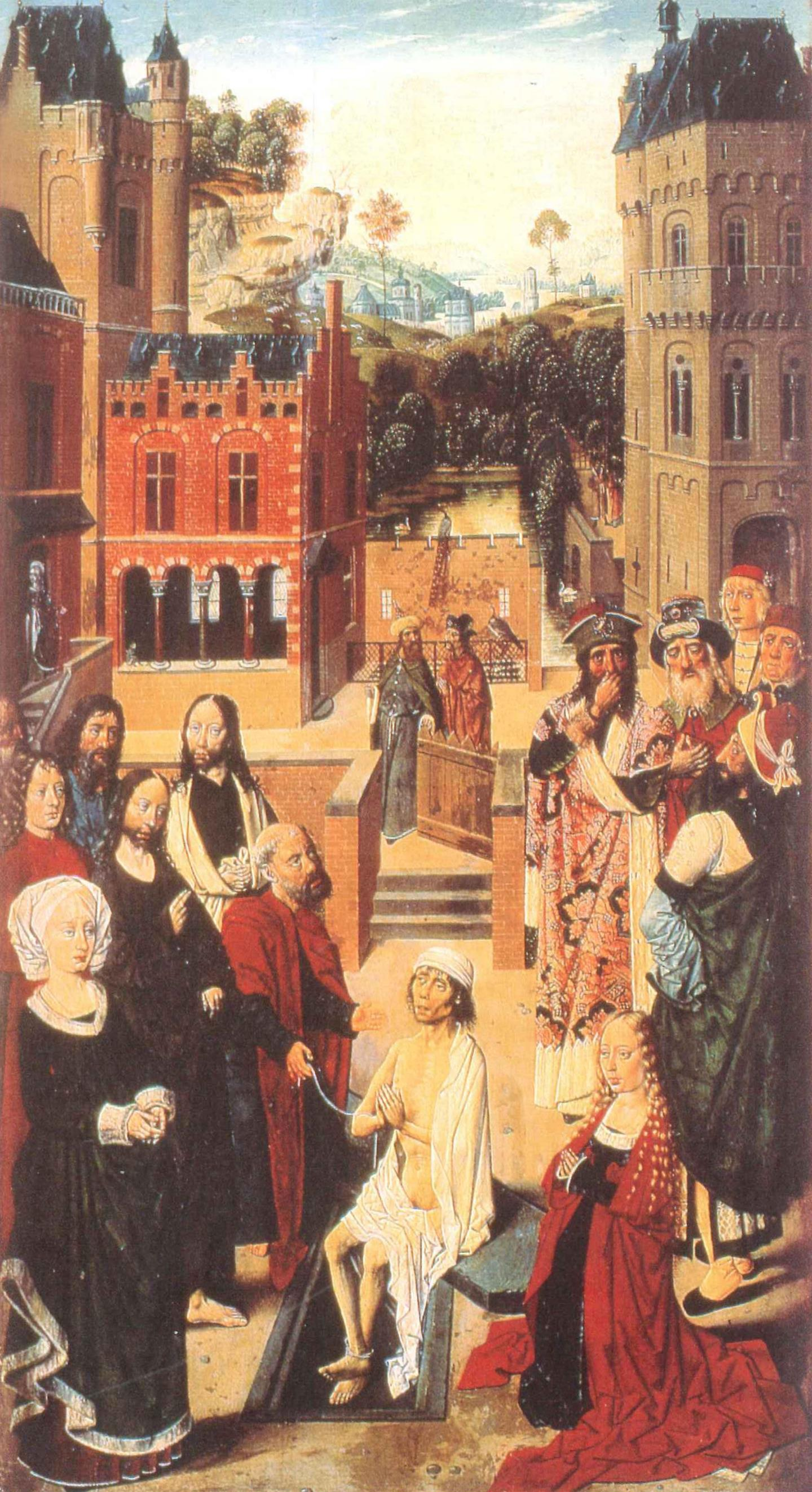
Resurrection of Lazarus, c. 1480

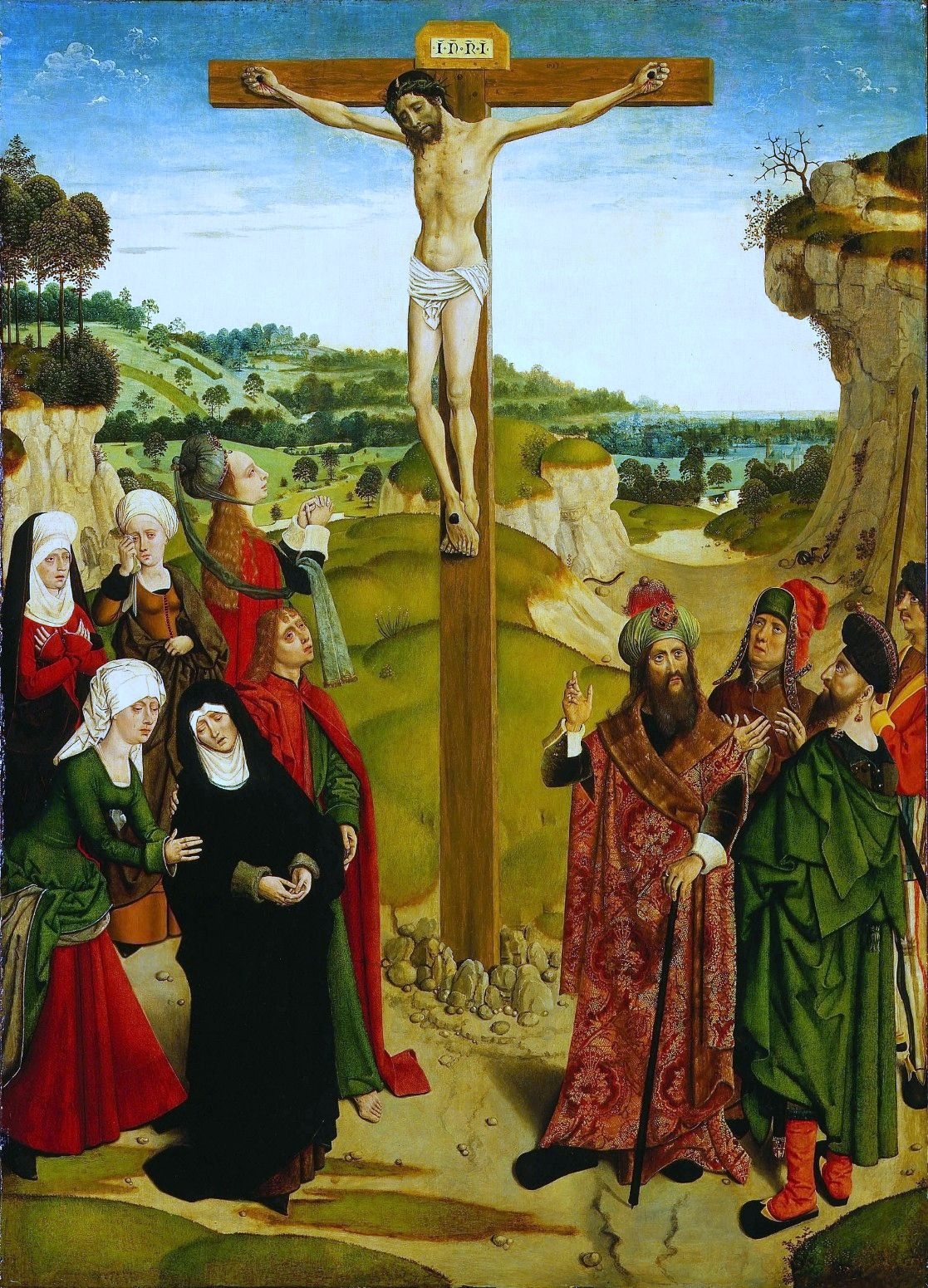
Crucifixion, c. 1485

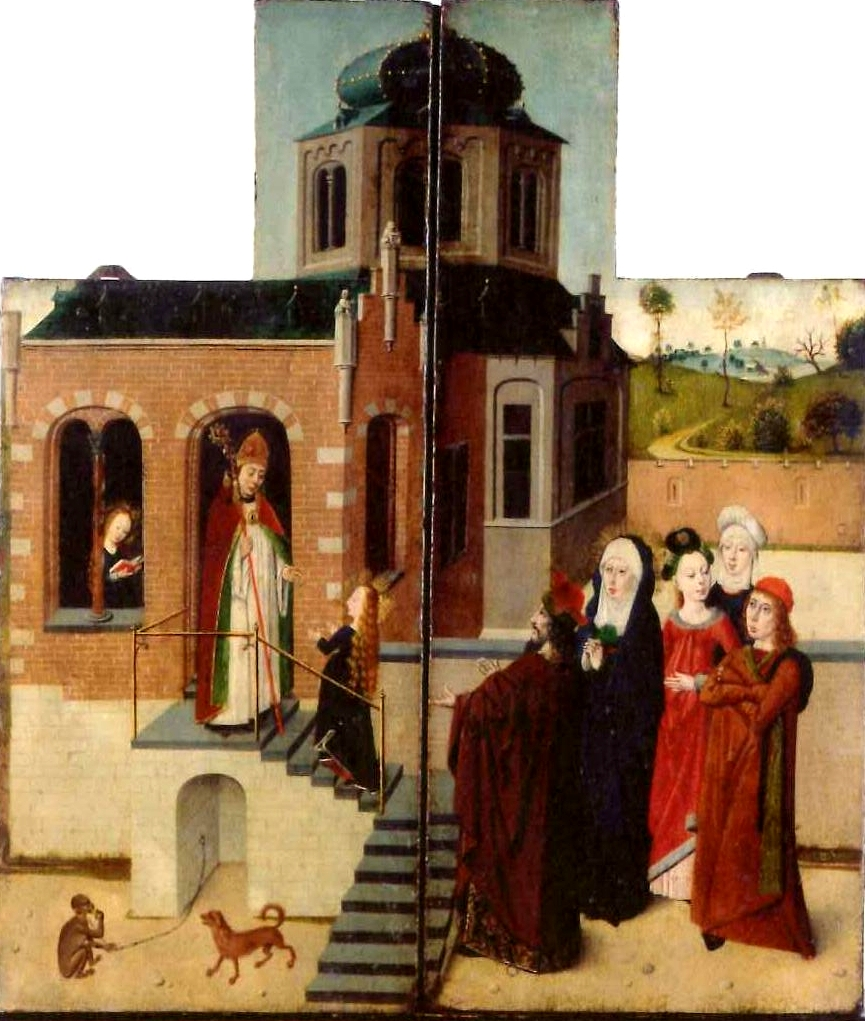
The Kempen Altar, back of the wings

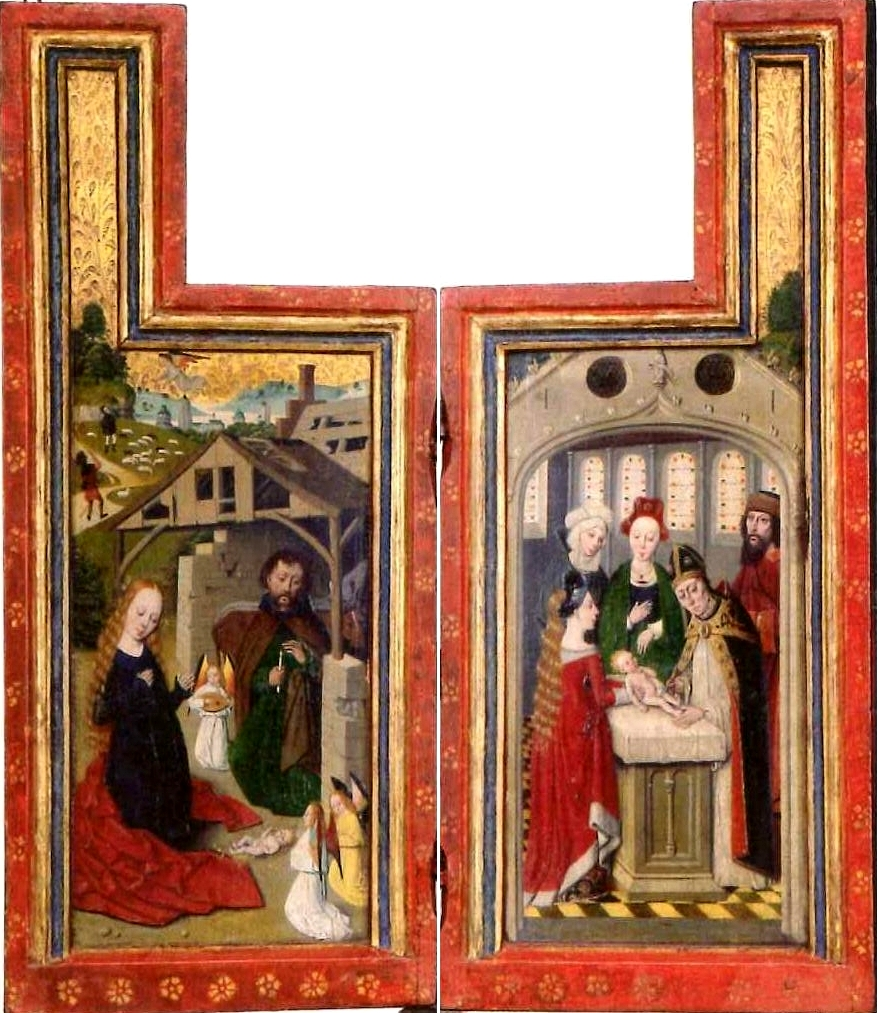
The Kempen Altar, front of the wings

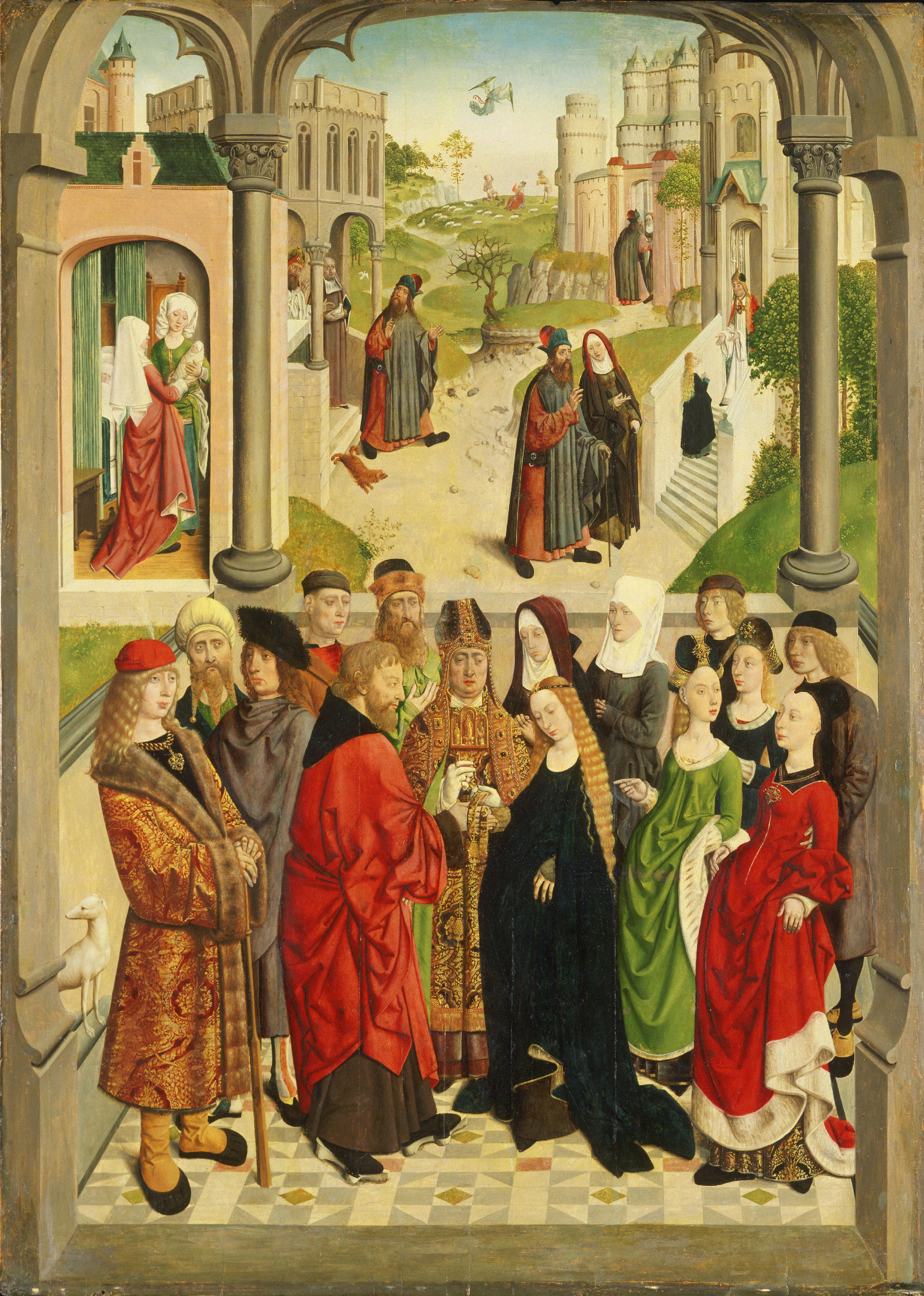
Marriage of the Virgin

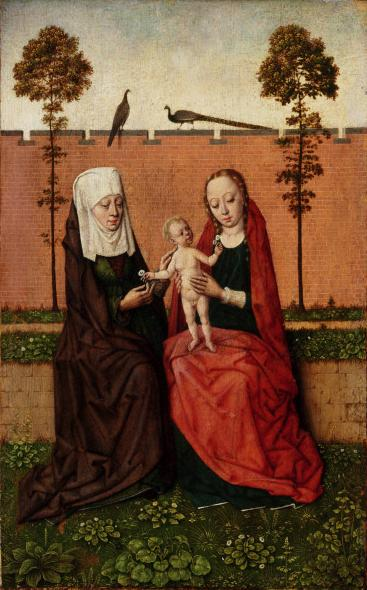
Madonna and Child and Ste Anne
