= Gary Weiss =

American journalist and author

- Born: United States
- Education: City College of New York; Medill School of Journalism at Northwestern University
- Occupations: Investigative journalist, columnist, author
- Years active: fl. 1984–present
- Known for: Born to Steal; Wall Street Versus America; Ayn Rand Nation; Retail Gangster

Gary Weiss is an American investigative journalist, columnist and author of books that examine the ethics of Wall Street. He was also a contributing editor for Condé Nast Portfolio. His Businessweek articles exposed organized crime on Wall Street and the Salomon Brothers bond trading scandal in the 1990s, and he covered the 2008 financial crisis and its aftermath.

== Early life and education ==
Weiss grew up in New York City and attended public schools, including the Bronx High School of Science. He received degrees from the City College of New York and the Medill School of Journalism at Northwestern University.

== Career ==
Weiss was a reporter for the Hartford Courant, then wrote for Barron's magazine from 1984, before joining Business Week magazine in 1986.

Between 1986 and 2004, Weiss wrote investigative articles for Business Week, including cover stories on the dangers of the Internet, as well as stock fraud and improprieties by brokerages large and small. His articles described widespread improper trading at the American Stock Exchange and broke the story of the bond trading scandal at Salomon Brothers in 1991. Weiss also wrote essays and articles critical of the Securities and Exchange Commission and other regulators, and in 1995 a cover story exploring the early manifestations of online investing.

In testimony before a U.S. Senate committee in 1991, Warren Buffett, then temporarily running Salomon Brothers, said that he learned of a bond trading scandal by reading Weiss' article in Business Week. At the time the article came out, he said, Salomon Brothers was denying a scandal was taking place. Buffett said, "I was not that aware personally about the squeeze, not until I did read that Business Week story".

Weiss authored a cover story in the April 1, 1996 edition, titled "Fall of the Wizard", that was critical of Julian Robertson's performance and behavior as manager of hedge fund Tiger Management. In response, Robertson sued Weiss and BusinessWeek for $1 billion for defamation. The suit was settled with no money changing hands, and BusinessWeek standing by the substance of its reporting. After two years of poor performance, the Tiger funds closed in 2000.

In 1998, Weiss wrote a Business Week commentary calling for strict limits on leverage, saying "limiting leverage may make some high-tech investment strategies difficult or impossible. It might also cut into the derivatives business of banks and Wall Street firms. If that's the case--well, so be it".

Weiss's "Mob on Wall Street" and other Business Week stories were praised by then-FBI Director Louis Freeh, in a letter published by Business Week in December 2000. Freeh wrote: "Gary Weiss has done our nation an invaluable service by reporting the manipulation of the stock market by elements of organized crime. By outlining specific stocks and stock brokerage firms that were controlled by organized crime, he opened the door for FBI investigations in Florida and in New York, and for that we owe him a tremendous debt of gratitude".

In 2006, Weiss became a founding member of Project Klebnikov, a global media alliance organized by investigative journalist Richard Behar investigating the July 2004 murder of Paul Klebnikov, editor-in-chief of the Russian edition of Forbes magazine, and continuing the investigative work that he started.

From November 2006 through March 2008, Weiss was a columnist for Forbes.

Weiss has been a contributor to The New York Times op-ed page and to Salon. In 2007 he criticized Overstock.com CEO Patrick Byrne and his campaign against naked short selling in numerous articles.

From October 2008 until 2010 Weiss was an editor for Condé Nast Portfolio. After the closing of Portfolio, Weiss continued to write for the Portfolio website, writing a weekly column, "The Weiss File", through December 2010. Weiss was co-founder with Richard Behar of The Mideast Reporter, leaving in November 2015. It became inactive in 2018 due to lack of financial support and closed in March 2025.

== Books ==
Born to Steal (2003) focuses on Mafia-linked stockbroker Louis Pasciuto and Wall Street firms infiltrated by organized crime in the 1990s.

Wall Street Versus America (2006) is an "attack, using humor and ridicule" on the morality of Wall Street, its regulators and the financial press. The book is critical of hedge funds, mutual funds, the Wall Street securities arbitration process, the New York Stock Exchange, and former Securities and Exchange Commission chairmen Arthur Levitt and William H. Donaldson. The book is also critical of campaigns against naked short selling, and takes a dim view of much financial journalism. Weiss singled out Bear Stearns in his criticism, and his comments on anti-naked-shorting activists provoked threats.

Ayn Rand Nation (2012) is an analysis of Ayn Rand's philosophy of Objectivism and its influence on the political and economic environment in the United States. George Monbiot, writing in The Guardian, argues that Weiss shows in the book that Rand 'has become to the new right what Karl Marx once was to the left: a demigod at the head of a chiliastic cult'.

== Bibliography ==
- Born to Steal: When the Mafia Hit Wall Street. Warner Books. 2004. ISBN 0-446-61398-3.
- Wall Street Versus America: The Rampant Greed and Dishonesty That Imperil Your Investments. Portfolio Hardcover. 2006. ISBN 1-59184-094-5.
- Ayn Rand Nation: The Hidden Struggle for America's Soul. St. Martin's Press. 2012. ISBN 978-0-312-59073-4.
- Retail Gangster: The Insane, Real-Life Story of Crazy Eddie. Hachette Books. 2022. ISBN 978-1-549-13409-8.
