= Otto of Passau =

Otto of Passau was a medieval German clerical author.

== Biography ==
All that is known of him is in the preface of his work, in which he calls himself a member of the Franciscan Order, at one time lector of theology at Basel, and says that he finished his writing on 2 (1) February 1386, dedicating it to all the "friends of God", both clerical and lay, male and female, and begs for their prayers.

According to Sbaralea (Suppl. Script. Franciscani ordinis, Rome, 1806, 571) he was a native of Flanders and belonged to the Franciscan ecclesiastical province of Cologne. Yet his name refers to the Bavarian city of Passau.

== Work ==
His book bears the German title (not Dutch, as one might expect from a Fleming) Die vierundzwanzig alten oder der guldin Tron der minnenden seelen; The 24 elders or the golden throne of loving souls. He introduces the twenty-four ancients referred to in Revelation 4:4, and makes them utter sentences of wisdom by which men can obtain the golden throne in eternal life.

The sentences are taken from the Holy Scripture, the Fathers of the Church, Scholastics and from non-Christian authors "whom the Church does not condemn". He thus enumerates 104 "masters", among whom are also some of the mystics, as Hugo and Richard of St. Victor. He generally gives accurate quotation of his sources though he also draws from some not specified, e.g. Elizabeth of Schönau. He tries to remain on strictly Catholic ground, but sometimes loses himself in dogmatical intricacies and quibbles. To be plain and intelligible he frequently uses trivial expressions.

He writes on the nature of God and of man, on their mutual relation, on the requisites for perfection: contrition, confession and penance; on internal and external life, purity of motives, shunning idleness, love of God and of the neighbour, the necessity of faith and the grace of God. He speaks of the Bible as the storehouse of divine wisdom and urges the faithful to read them. In speaking of contemplative life he insists that none can reach it without spending time in the active service of God and man. The term "friends of God" he explains according to John 15:15, and speaks of prayer, humility, obedience, spiritual life, virtues and vices, and shows Christ as the model of all virtues. The longest chapters, eleven and twelve, he devotes to the Holy Eucharist and to the Blessed Virgin. The last chapters treat of death and the future life.

About forty manuscript copies of the book survive. It was popular in the south of Germany, along the Lower Rhine and in the Netherlands. It first appeared in print in 1470, probably by Albrecht Pfister in Bamberg. A modernized edition, Die Krone der Aeltesten, was made in 1835 at Landshut as a tenth volume of Leitstern auf der Bahn des Heils.
