= The Nasty Girl =

1990 film by Michael Verhoeven

- Theatrical release poster
- German: Das schreckliche Mädchen
- Directed by: Michael Verhoeven
- Written by: Michael Verhoeven
- Produced by: Michael Senftleben
- Starring: Lena Stolze; Hans-Reinhard Müller; Monika Baumgartner; Elisabeth Bertram; Michael Gahr; Robert Giggenbach; Fred Stillkrauth; Udo Thomer; Barbara Gallauner; Kurt Weinzierl; Ottfried Fischer
- Cinematography: Axel de Roche
- Edited by: Barbara Hennings
- Music by: Lydie Auvray; Billy Gorlt; Mike Herting; Elmar Schloter
- Distributed by: Filmverlag der Autoren
- Release date: 15 February 1990
- Running time: 94 minutes
- Country: West Germany
- Language: German

The Nasty Girl (German: Das schreckliche Mädchen, lit. 'The Terrible Girl') is a 1990 West German drama film written and directed by Michael Verhoeven, based on the true story of Anna Rosmus.

The film received an Academy Award nomination for Best Foreign Language Film at the 63rd Academy Awards.

== Plot ==
A German high school student, Sonja (Lena Stolze as a fictionalised version of Anna Rosmus), wins an essay contest and embarks on a trip to Paris. Martin Wegmus begins teaching physics at Sonja's school, and one of her classmates falls in love with him. Almost by chance, Mr. Wegmus and Sonja share a kiss. The teacher promises to return for her. The following year, she enters the contest again, choosing "My Town During the Third Reich" from the available topics. Her research leads her to discover that her picture-perfect town had been intimately involved in the Third Reich, with nearly all of the city's prominent families having been members of the Nazi party long before it rose to power. As she delves deeper, local authorities stonewall her efforts.

Undeterred, Sonja persists and learns that there were eight concentration camps in the area, and that all the Jews were forcibly expelled from the town and had their property confiscated. Sonja marries Martin, and the townsfolk believe she has abandoned her pursuit of uncovering Nazi involvement. Despite this, Sonja bears two daughters and pursues studies in history at the university. She resumes her research into the town's Nazi past and succeeds in winning court cases that grant her access to archives, although she still must resort to trickery to obtain desired information. The hostility of the townspeople escalates from verbal abuse to death threats and physical assaults as they endeavor to silence her with increasing desperation, but nothing dissuades her. Her husband feels emasculated as he is compelled to care for the children. The family survives a bomb attack, yet Sonja persists with her research.

Ultimately, the townspeople change their stance, even going so far as to erect a bust of Sonja at the town hall. However, Sonja views this gesture as an attempt to silence her and rejects the honor.

== Cast ==
- Lena Stolze as Sonja
- Hans-Reinhard Müller as Juckenack
- Monika Baumgartner as Sonja's mother
- Elisabeth Bertram as Sonja's grandma
- Michael Gahr as Paul Rosenberger
- Robert Giggenbach as Martin
- Fred Stillkrauth as Sonja's uncle
- Barbara Gallauner as Miss Juckenack
- Udo Thomer as Archivist Schulz

== Reception ==
The film has an approval rating of 57% on Rotten Tomatoes from seven critic reviews.

== Awards ==
- BAFTA Award for Best Film not in the English Language
- Berlin International Film Festival: Silver Bear for Best Director (Michael Verhoeven)
- New York Film Critics Circle Awards for Best Foreign Language Film

== Award nominations ==
- Academy Award for Best Foreign Language Film
- Golden Bear, Berlin Film Festival
- Golden Globe Award for Best Foreign Language Film

== See also ==
- List of submissions to the 63rd Academy Awards for Best Foreign Language Film
- List of German submissions for the Academy Award for Best Foreign Language Film
