= Crazy Eddie =

U.S. electronics retail company

- Type: Public company
- Traded as: Nasdaq: CRZY
- Industry: Consumer electronics
- Founded: New York City, 1971 (original); Wayne, New Jersey, 1998 (revival); 2009 (second revival)
- Defunct: 1989 (original); 2005 (first revival); 2012 (second revival)
- Fate: Bankruptcy
- Headquarters: New York City (original headquarters); Edison, New Jersey (second headquarters)
- Key people: Eddie Antar, co-founder, president and CEO; Sam M. Antar, co-founder Sam E. Antar, CFO

Crazy Eddie was a consumer electronics retail chain in the Northeastern United States. It was founded in 1969 in New York City by Eddie Antar and Sam M. Antar and initially operated as ERS Electronics, named for its three initial partners: Eddie Antar, Ronnie Gindi, and Eddie's father Sam M. Antar. The chain expanded in the New York metropolitan area and became known for discount pricing and extensive radio and television advertising featuring spokesperson Jerry Carroll. At its peak, Crazy Eddie operated 43 stores in four states and reported more than $300 million in sales.

The company engaged in fraudulent business practices, including underreporting income, skimming sales tax receipts, and paying employees off the books. During the process of becoming a public company, it continued to engage in fraud, including overstating profits and inflating inventory. Eddie Antar resigned from the company in December 1986 after selling company stock. In November 1987, the board approved the sale of the company and members of the Antar family were removed from management. In 1989, Crazy Eddie filed for bankruptcy and was liquidated.

In February 1987, the United States Attorney's Office for the District of New Jersey began a federal grand jury investigation into Crazy Eddie's finances. In September 1987, the United States Securities and Exchange Commission initiated an investigation into alleged violations of federal securities laws by company officers and employees. Eddie Antar later fled to Israel in February 1990 and was returned to the United States in January 1993. His 1993 conviction on fraud charges was overturned on appeal, and he later pleaded guilty in 1996. In 1997, Antar was sentenced to eight years in prison and assessed fines. He was released in 1999 and died in 2016.

== Background ==
Eddie Antar (December 18, 1947–September 10, 2016) was born in Brooklyn, New York City, to a family of Syrian Jewish origin. His grandparents moved to Brooklyn from Aleppo, Syria. Antar's father, Sam Antar, was a retailer.

The predecessor to Crazy Eddie was a consumer electronics store called Sight and Sound. It was operated by ERS Electronics, a company owned by Sam M. Antar, Eddie Antar, and Eddie Antar's cousin Ronnie Gindi. Sight and Sound, located on Kings Highway in Brooklyn, began operations in 1969. Eddie Antar became known as "Crazy Eddie" for his sales approach. Within eighteen months, the store was near bankruptcy. Eddie Antar later bought out Gindi's ownership stake, and Sam M. Antar retained an ownership interest while leaving day-to-day operations to Eddie Antar. In 1971, the Kings Highway store was renamed Crazy Eddie.

During the 1970s, the company expanded beyond Brooklyn. A second location opened in Syosset, New York, in 1973, followed by a third location in Greenwich Village in 1975. The company established a corporate office on Coney Island Avenue in Brooklyn that year. By 1977, it had opened additional stores, including locations in The Bronx and in Paramus, New Jersey, along Route 17. By 1981, Crazy Eddie operated ten locations, including a Manhattan store on East 57th Street on the Upper East Side.

== Advertising ==
Former New York radio DJ Jerry Carroll appeared in more than 7,500 commercials as a Crazy Eddie pitchman.

Crazy Eddie advertising in the New York metropolitan area featured Jerry Carroll. The association began in 1972, when Carroll was a radio disc jockey known as "Dr. Jerry" at WPIX-FM. Antar purchased on-air advertising and Carroll delivered the slogan "his prices are insane" in an exaggerated style. Antar requested that Carroll repeat the delivery consistently in later advertisements.

Carroll began appearing in television commercials for Crazy Eddie in 1975 and continued for much of the next fifteen years. One recurring promotion was the chain's "Christmas in August" sale. Carroll also appeared in a Spanish-language advertisement, without a speaking role.

During the 1980s, more than 7,500 radio and television advertisements were broadcast in the tri-state area. Crazy Eddie also produced a commercial depicting Carroll as a superhero character. Warner Communications sued the chain over that advertisement; the dispute was later settled.

Crazy Eddie advertising was referenced and parodied in other media. Not Necessarily the News aired a parody commercial featuring a caricature of Oliver North. Saturday Night Live aired a parody segment on January 22, 1977, featuring Dan Aykroyd as "Crazy Ernie". The commercials also appeared in films, including Splash (1984).

In 1985, Carroll appeared in a television commercial for Yoplait yogurt.

Crazy Eddie hosted in-store appearances by musicians, including the members of Queen at a Manhattan location on July 27, 1982, prior to the band's performance at Madison Square Garden.

== Fraud and decline ==
Crazy Eddie management engaged in tax and accounting fraud, including falsifying records to reduce taxable income. The company also paid employees off the books and skimmed cash receipts. According to published accounts, portions of the proceeds were deposited in Israeli bank accounts beginning in 1979, and the family deposited millions of dollars in offshore accounts during the early 1980s.

By the early 1980s, the company prepared to become publicly traded. One method described in published accounts was reducing the amount of cash being skimmed, which increased reported earnings and profit margins. Between 1980 and 1983, reported profit growth exceeded the company's underlying profit growth, according to accounts of the fraud.

Crazy Eddie held its initial public offering on September 13, 1984 (former symbol: CRZY). Shares, which were traded on the NASDAQ, initially sold for $8. By early 1986, the stock traded above $75 per share.

Eddie Antar recruited his cousin Sam E. Antar to assist with accounting and financial reporting. Sammy earned an accounting degree in 1980 and worked for Penn and Horowitz, Crazy Eddie's auditor. In 1986, he became chief financial officer. Published accounts describe schemes that used funds held abroad to inflate reported sales and financial results, including transfers through accounts in Panama.

As a public company, Crazy Eddie engaged in inventory fraud to inflate reported profits. For the fiscal year ending March 1, 1985, published accounts reported that inventories were overstated by $3 million, with larger overstatements reported in the following fiscal year.

In 1987, published accounts describe a shift from inflating results to concealing earlier misstatements. During fiscal year 1987, inventory figures were overstated by tens of millions of dollars, and the company recorded debit memos and chargebacks to vendors that reduced accounts payable. By late 1986 and into 1987, the company's stock price declined and earnings decreased, while sales growth reflected new store openings. In May 1987, Antar pursued a plan to take the company private and sought financing from Canadian investment banker Samuel Belzberg.

In 1987, Texas-based investor Elias Zinn acquired a significant stake in Crazy Eddie and, with support from management consultant Victor Palmieri, obtained a controlling interest through a hostile takeover. After the takeover, analysts concluded that the company's inventory was materially overstated, with published accounts later estimating a final shortfall of $80 million.

In February 1989, Zinn left the company; the next month, seventeen of the forty-three locations were closed in an attempt to mitigate losses. Crazy Eddie filed for Chapter 11 bankruptcy protection in June 1989 after its creditors had begun proceedings to try to force it into bankruptcy.

Eight more stores were closed that August. Then, on September 5, Crazy Eddie stock was delisted from the NASDAQ. Less than a month later, on October 2, the executive board of Crazy Eddie filed for Chapter 7 bankruptcy, and the company liquidated. By the end of November 1989, the remaining eighteen stores had closed.

=== Legal battles ===
A former Crazy Eddie associate, Arnie Spindler, provided investigators with information about the company's financial practices, according to published accounts. In August 1987, the band They Might Be Giants threatened legal action over allegations that the chain used 2 of their songs called “Absolutely Bill’s Mood” and “Mr. Me” in a radio commercial without permission after the band declined to write a jingle.

In September 1989, the SEC charged Eddie Antar with securities fraud and illegal insider trading. In January 1990, a federal judge ordered Antar to repatriate funds transferred to Israel and to appear in court. After failing to appear for hearings, warrants were issued and assets were frozen, according to published accounts.

Antar fled to Israel under an alias and was arrested in 1992 in connection with extradition proceedings. He returned to the United States in January 1993 after legal proceedings in Israel. His trial began in June 1993, and he was convicted on multiple counts of fraud in July 1993. His conviction was later overturned on appeal in 1995 based on findings of judicial bias, according to published accounts. Antar later pleaded guilty in 1996 and was sentenced in 1997 to eight years in prison. Civil litigation continued for many years, and efforts to recover funds for investors continued into the 2010s.

== Aftermath ==
After the chain closed, multiple groups acquired or used the Crazy Eddie trademark for revival attempts. In 1990, a New Jersey-based investment group led by Alex Adjmi announced plans to reopen stores, but the effort did not proceed.

In 1998, relatives of the Antar family reopened a store in Wayne, New Jersey and launched an online venture, crazyeddieonline.com. The business did not expand beyond the Wayne location and later closed.

In the early 2000s, the brand was used for online retail operations under various owners. The trademark was later acquired by Trident Growth Fund, which attempted to auction the brand and the domain name crazyeddie.com in 2006. In 2009, businessman Jack Gemal began an online retail venture using the Crazy Eddie name and the website pricesareinsane.com. The business later ceased operations. As of 2018, the Crazy Eddie trademark was listed as abandoned.

Jerry Carroll died in October 2020 after suffering from cardiac issues. Writer Gary Weiss, in doing research for a book he was writing about the rise and fall of Crazy Eddie, learned that Carroll's death had not been publicized, despite how ubiquitous a presence he was while serving as spokesman for Crazy Eddie.

Eddie Antar died on September 10, 2016, at age 68. A funeral home in Ocean Township, New Jersey confirmed his death. Reports stated that Antar had liver cancer, though an official cause of death was not released.

== 2022 book ==
In August 2022, journalist Gary Weiss published Retail Gangster, a book about Crazy Eddie and the fraud committed by company leadership.

== Legacy ==
Crazy Eddie has been referenced in film and television, including Splash, The Brave Little Toaster, Futurama, The Accountant, Russian Doll, and X-Men '97.
