= Paul Klebnikov =

American journalist and historian of Russia

- Born: June 3, 1963; New York, USA
- Died: July 9, 2004 (aged 41); Moscow, Russia
- Education: St. Bernard's School, Phillips Exeter Academy (1981), University of California, Berkeley, (BA); London School of Economics (PhD)
- Occupation: Journalist
- Organization: Forbes
- Known for: 2004 murder
- Spouse: Helen "Musa" Train
- Children: Alexander, Gregory, and Sophia

Paul Klebnikov (Russian: Павел Юрьевич Хлебников, romanized: Pavel Yurievich Khlebnikov; June 3, 1963 – July 9, 2004) was an American journalist and historian of Russia. He worked for Forbes magazine for more than 10 years and, at the time of his death, was chief editor of the Russian edition of Forbes. His murder in Moscow in 2004 was seen as a blow against investigative journalism in Russia. Three Chechens accused of taking part in the murder were acquitted. Though the murder appeared to be the work of assassins for hire, as of 2026, the alleged organizers of the murder had yet to be identified. According to another version, widely reported in Russian media, Klebnikov was killed by a close associate to the high-ranking member of Lazansky organized criminal gang linked both to the Russian FSS service and Boris Berezovsky, a Russian oligarch.

== Early life ==
Paul Klebnikov was born in New York to an aristocratic family of Russian American White émigrés with a long military and political tradition: his great-great-great-grandfather Ivan Pushchin participated in the Decembrist revolt in 1825 and was exiled to Siberia, and his great-grandfather Arkady Nebolsin, an admiral in the White Russian fleet, was assassinated by Bolsheviks. As a child, he was known as a daredevil including swimming during hurricanes. He attended St. Bernard's School and Phillips Exeter Academy, and graduated from the University of California, Berkeley, with a BA in political science in 1984. He then enrolled in the Officer Candidates School of the US Marine Corps as a way to test himself but, upon completing the course, declined to take the offered commission.

Instead, he pursued a PhD at the London School of Economics, where he would go on to win the Leonard Schapiro Prize "for excellence in Russian studies". Klebnikov wrote his doctoral thesis on agrarian reform in Russia following the Stolypin Reforms that sought to build an independent, progressive, and prosperous peasantry. His thesis was titled "Agricultural Development in Russia, 1906-1917: Land Reform, Social Agronomy and Cooperation". From 1987 to 1988, he lectured at the Institute of European Studies in London.

On September 22, 1991, he married Helen "Musa" Train, the daughter of prominent Wall Street banker John Train. The couple would go on to have three children.

== Reporting on Russia ==
Klebnikov joined Forbes in 1989 and gained a reputation for investigating murky post-Soviet business dealings and corruption. In 1996, he wrote a cover story for Forbes titled "Godfather of the Kremlin?" with the kicker 'Power. Politics. Murder. Boris Berezovsky could teach the guys in Sicily a thing or two.', comparing Russian tycoon Boris Berezovsky to the Sicilian mafia. The article was published without a byline, but was widely known to be Klebnikov's work. Klebnikov soon received death threats, and took a break from reporting in Russia to live with his family in Paris.

Berezovsky subsequently sued Forbes for libel in a British court. Because the story had been published in an American magazine about a Russian citizen, the choice of venue was described by several authorities as libel tourism. Berezovsky won a partial retraction of the story in 2003.

Meanwhile, Klebnikov expanded the article into the 2000 book Godfather of the Kremlin: Boris Berezovsky and the Looting of Russia. Believed to be based heavily on interviews with Alexander Korzhakov, the head of security for former president Boris Yeltsin, the book described the privatization process used by Yeltsin as "the robbery of the century" and detailed the alleged corruption of various Russian businesspeople, particularly focusing on Berezovsky. The book met with mixed reviews in journalistic circles. A review in The New York Times praised it as "richly detailed" and "effectively angry".

Klebnikov released a second book, Conversation with a Barbarian: Interviews with a Chechen Field Commander on Banditry and Islam, in 2003. The book is a transcript of a lengthy interview with Chechen rebel leader Khozh-Ahmed Noukhayev, conducted in Baku, Azerbaijan. In the course of the interview, Nukhayev gives his views on Islam and Chechen society.

In the same year, Klebnikov was chosen to be the first editor of the Russian edition of Forbes. Because his wife and children did not wish to move to Russia, Klebnikov agreed with them that he would take the post for only one year. The magazine only put out four issues before his death, including an article covering Russia's 100 wealthiest individuals, which some commentators speculate may have been the reason for his death.

== Murder ==
On July 9, 2004, while leaving the Forbes office in the city, Klebnikov was attacked on a Moscow street late at night by unknown assailants who fired at him from a slowly moving car. Klebnikov was shot four times and initially survived, but he died at the hospital after being transported in an ambulance that had no oxygen bottle, and delays when a hospital elevator broke down.

Authorities described the attack as a contract killing. The publisher of the Russian edition of Forbes stated that the murder was "definitely linked" to Klebnikov's journalism. Various commentators have speculated that the magazine's recent story on Russia's 100 richest people may have triggered the attack; others suspect Berezovsky of being behind the murder.

=== Russian investigation ===
In 2006, prosecutors accused Chechen rebel leader Khozh-Ahmed Noukhayev, subject of Klebnikov's book A Conversation with a Barbarian, of masterminding the attack. Three Chechen men—Kazbek Dukuzov, Musa Vakhayev, and Fail Sadretdinov—were arrested and tried in a closed trial for the murder, but all three were acquitted. Sadretdinov was later convicted on unrelated charges and sentenced to nine years' imprisonment, while Vakhayev and Dukuzov had their acquittals overturned by the Supreme Court of Russia, allowing them to be re-prosecuted.

In July 2007, on the third anniversary of the murder, the U.S. Department of State protested the continuing failure of the Russian government to find the perpetrators, calling for further investigation. U.S. President George W. Bush also appealed directly to Russian President Vladimir Putin for action.

Vakhayev and Dukuzov were scheduled to be retried in 2007, again in a closed trial, but could not be located. On December 17, the trial was postponed again because of Dukuzov's continued absence. The process then "quietly stalled".

In July 2009, Russian authorities agreed to reopen the suspended investigation into the killings. They also stated that they no longer believed Nukhayev had masterminded the murder (though they continued to believe he played some role in the attack).

== Legacy ==
In 2004, the Committee to Protect Journalists posthumously named Klebnikov one of four winners of the CPJ International Press Freedom Awards.

An organization named the Paul Klebnikov Fund was established in his memory to award an annual courage prize to journalists as well as granting internships to young Russian journalists to work in Western media.

Klebnikov's Exeter classmates endowed an annual Klebnikov Lecture to honor his memory. The first Klebnikov Lecture was held on May 12, 2006, at the 25th reunion of Klebnikov's Exeter class (1981), and featured remarks by The Wall Street Journal correspondent and Exeter alumnus Jon Karp.

=== Project Klebnikov ===
Project Klebnikov is a global alliance specifically devoted to developing new information on the Klebnikov murder and to furthering some of the investigative work Klebnikov began. The organization was founded in July 2005, and includes over 20 journalists and partner media companies. The organization has an international representation of investigative journalists, including individuals from Vanity Fair, 60 Minutes, New York University's department of journalism, The Economist, Bloomberg News, and Forbes. It was launched by eight journalists from Bloomberg, Vanity Fair and Forbes on July 9, 2005, the anniversary of Klebnikov's murder. Journalist Richard Behar serves as the organization's director.

== Books ==
- Klebnikov, Paul (2000). Godfather of the Kremlin: Boris Berezovsky and the looting of Russia. Harcourt. ISBN 0-15-100621-0.

== See also ==
- Georgiy Gongadze
- Dmitry Kholodov
- Walter Liggett
- Vladislav Listyev
- Anna Politkovskaya
- List of unsolved murders (2000–present)
