= Passau =

University town in Lower Bavaria, Germany

- Town
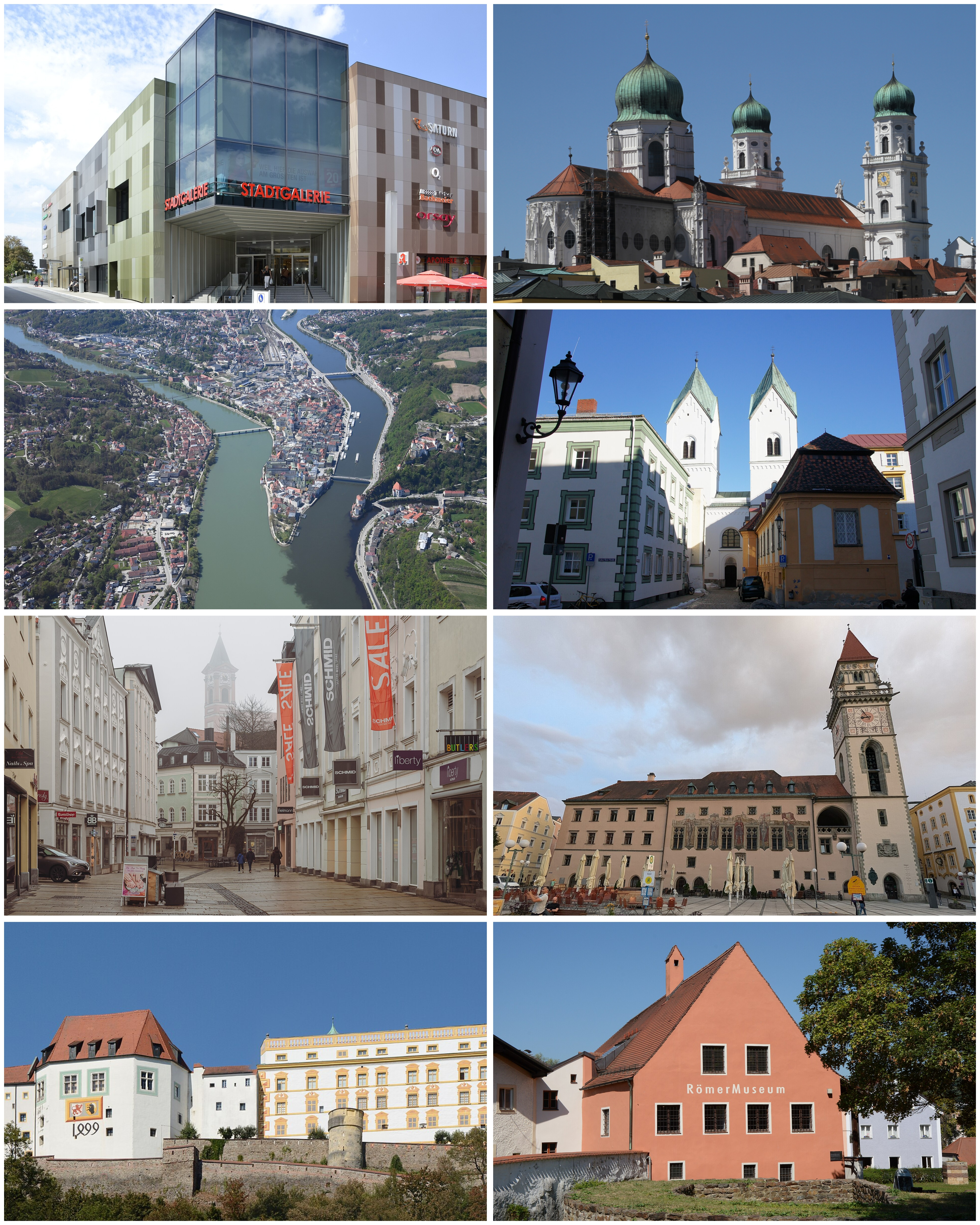
- Clockwise from top: Stadtgalerie; St. Stephen's Cathedral; Heiligkreuz Church; Old Town Hall; Römermuseum; Veste Oberhaus; Old Town; View of Passau

- Flag Coat of arms
- Interactive map of Passau
- Location within Germany Location within Bavaria
- Coordinates: 48°34′28″N 13°27′53″E
- Country: Germany
- State: Bavaria
- Admin. region: Niederbayern
- District: Urban district

Government
  - Mayor (2026–32): Andreas Rother (SPD)

Area
  - Total: 69.56 km^{2} (26.86 sq mi)
- Elevation: 294–447 m (965–1,467 ft)

Population (2025-12-31)
  - Total: 53,523
  - Density: 769.5/km^{2} (1,993/sq mi)
- Time zone: UTC+01:00 (CET)
  - Summer (DST): UTC+02:00 (CEST)
- Postal codes: 94001–94036
- Dialling codes: 0851
- Vehicle registration: PA
- Website: www.passau.de

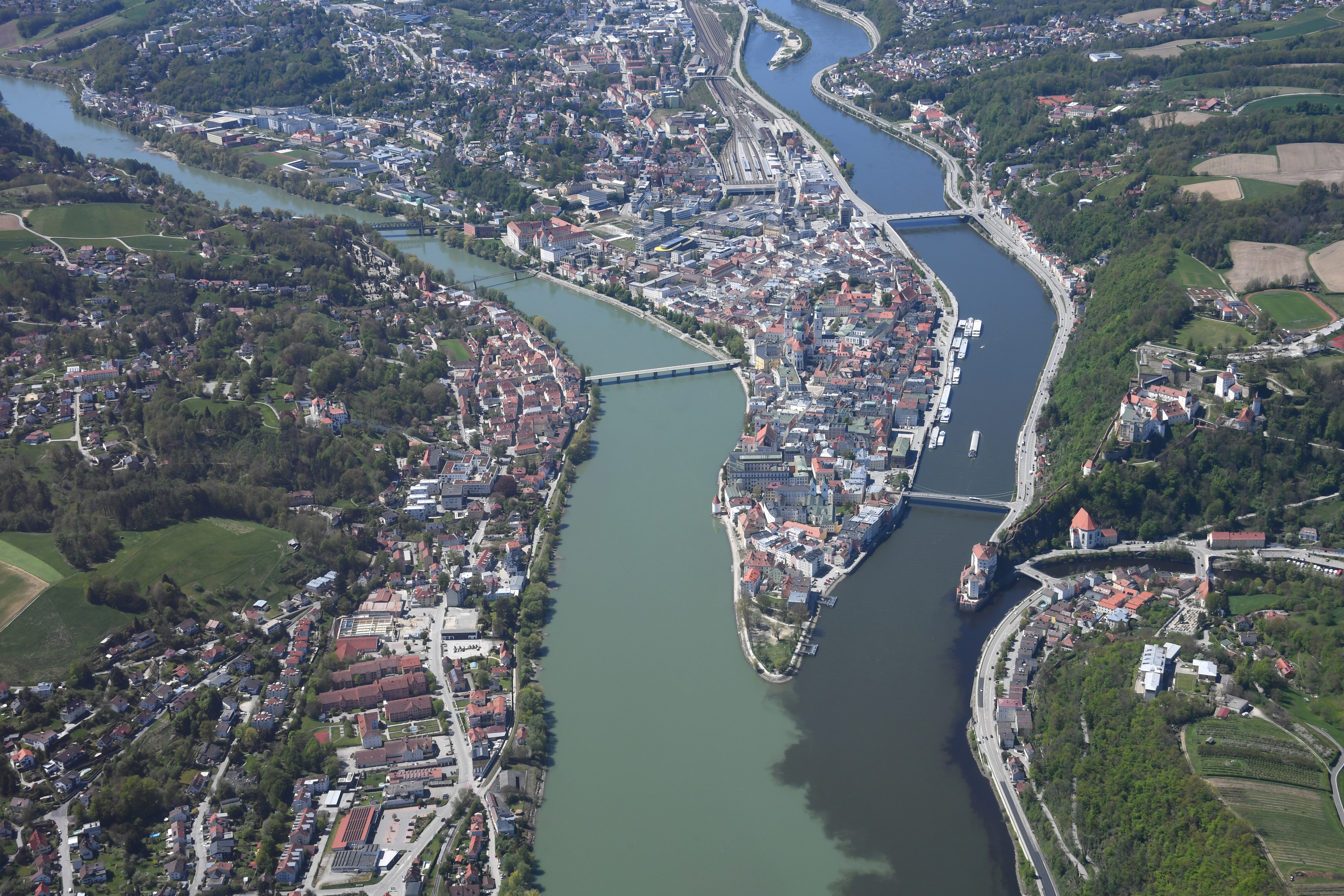
Aerial image of Passau showing the old town and the confluence of the rivers Inn, Danube, and Ilz (from left to right)

Passau (Note: /ˈpæsaʊ/ PAS-ow; German: [ˈpasaʊ]; Central Bavarian: Båssa) is a city in Lower Bavaria, Germany. It is also known as the Dreiflüssestadt (lit. 'City of Three Rivers'), as the river Danube is joined by the Inn from the south and the Ilz from the north.

Passau's population is about 50,000, of whom about 12,000 are students at the University of Passau, renowned in Germany for its institutes of economics, law, theology, computer science and cultural studies.

== History ==
In the 2nd century BC, many of the Boii tribe were pushed north across the Alps out of northern Italy by the Romans. They established a new capital called Boiodurum by the Romans (from Gaulish Boioduron), now within the Innstadt district of Passau.

Passau was an ancient Roman colony called Batavis, Latin for "for the Batavi". The Batavi were an ancient Germanic tribe from area of the Rhine delta who frequently served in the Roman army as auxiliary troops. Batavis (Passau-Altstadt) was a Roman castrum in the province of Raetia, while another late Roman castrum, Boiotro (Passau-Innstadt), was in the province of Noricum.

During the second half of the 5th century, St. Severinus established a monastery here. The site was subject to repeated raids by the Alemanni. In 739, the recently consecrated English archbishop Boniface founded the diocese of Passau, which for many years was the largest diocese of the German Kingdom/Holy Roman Empire, covering territory in southern Bavaria and most of what is now Upper and Lower Austria. From the 10th century the bishops of Passau also exercised secular authority as Prince-Bishops in the immediate area around Passau (see Prince-Bishopric of Passau).

Before the Holocaust, there was a small Jewish community present in Passau, with Jews being mentioned as early as the 10th century.

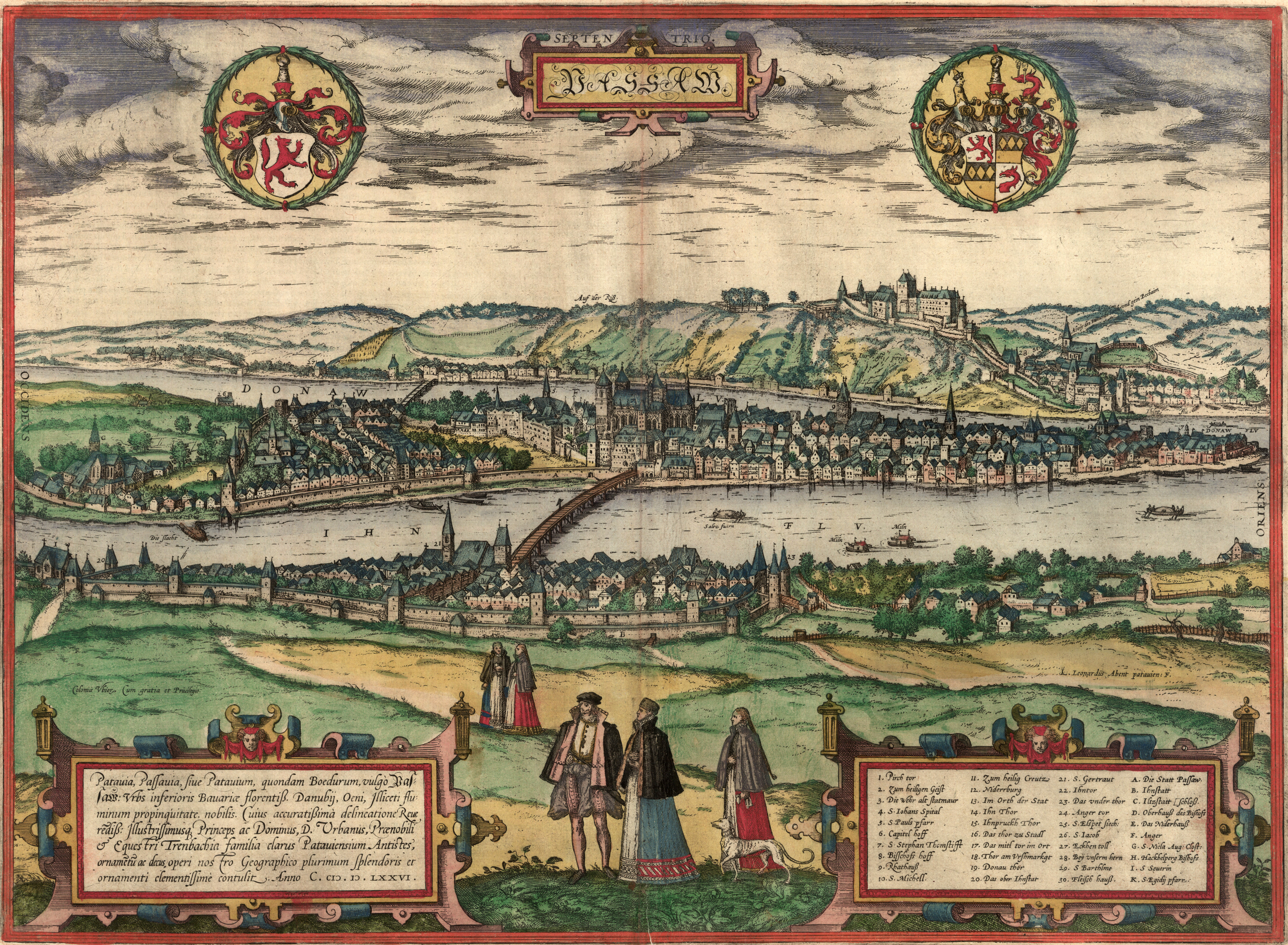
Passau c. 1581

In the Treaty of Passau (1552), Archduke Ferdinand I, representing Emperor Charles V, secured the agreement of the Protestant princes to submit the religious question to a diet. This led to the Peace of Augsburg in 1555.

During the Renaissance and early modern period, Passau was one of the most prolific centres of sword and bladed weapon manufacture in Germany (after Solingen). Passau smiths stamped their blades with the Passau wolf, usually a rather simplified rendering of the wolf on the city's coat-of-arms. Superstitious warriors believed that the Passau wolf conferred invulnerability on the blade's bearer, and thus Passau swords acquired a great premium. According to the Donau-Zeitung, aside from the wolf, some cabalistic signs and inscriptions were added. As a result, the whole practice of placing magical charms on swords to protect the wearers came to be known for a time as "Passau art". Other cities' smiths, including those of Solingen, recognized the marketing value of the Passau wolf and adopted it for themselves. By the 17th century, Solingen was producing more wolf-stamped blades than Passau was.

In 1662, a devastating fire consumed most of the city. Passau was subsequently rebuilt in the Baroque style.

Passau was secularised and divided between the Electorate of Bavaria and the Electorate of Salzburg in 1803. The portion belonging to Salzburg became part of Bavaria in 1805.

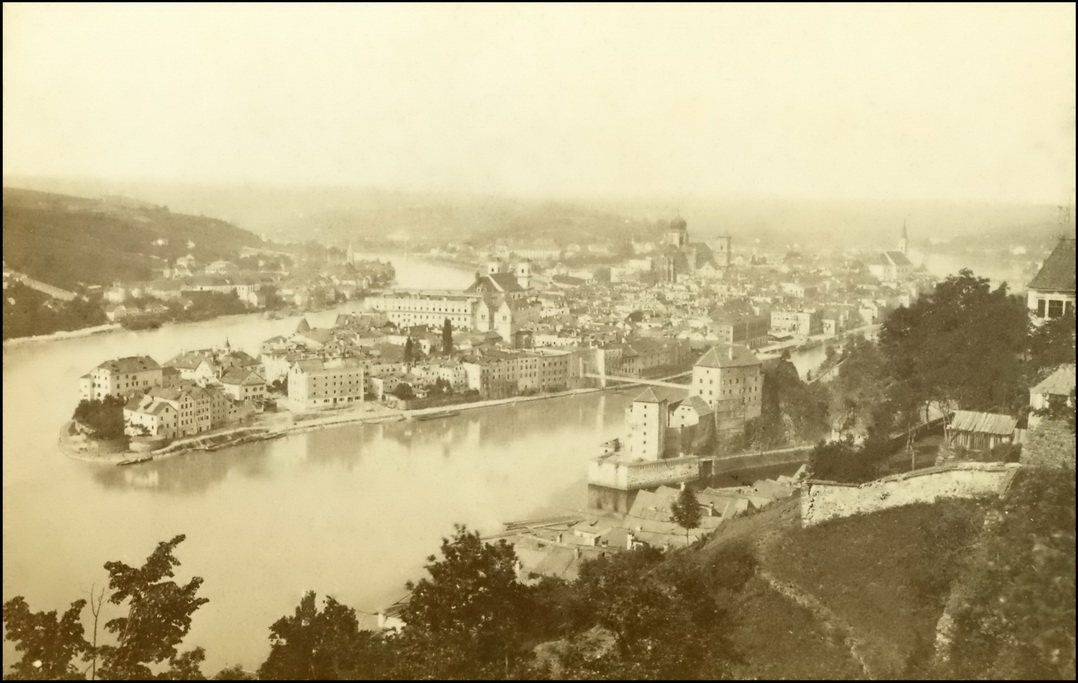
Passau 1892

From 1892 until 1894, Adolf Hitler and his family lived in Passau. The city archives mention Hitler being in Passau on four occasions in the 1920s for speeches. In addition, Heinrich Himmler spent some time there.

In November 1933, the building of Nibelungenhalle (Hall of the Nibelungs) was announced. Intended to hold 8,000 to 10,000 guests, and another 30,000 in front of it, in 1935 the hall also became quarters for a unit of the Austrian Legion. Beginning in 1934, these troops had occupied a building that belonged to Sigmund Mandl, a Jewish merchant. That building, in turn, was referred to as SA barracks.

Beginning in 1940, Passau offered the building at Bräugasse 13 to Volksdeutsche Mittelstelle.

During World War II, the city also housed three sub-camps of the infamous Mauthausen-Gusen concentration camp: Passau I (Oberilzmühle), Passau II (Waldwerke Passau-Ilzstadt) and Passau III (Jandelsbrunn). From January to May 1945, refugees from East Prussia and Silesia passed the city, after May, as the result of ethnic cleansing of neighbouring Bohemia and Moravia of their German populace, further waves of refugees arrived in the city.

According to research by local historian Anna Rosmus, hundreds of forced abortions occurred in the city to Polish, Ukrainian and other forced farm laborers during the war. After the war, according to Rosmus, the governments of Lower Bavaria and Passau participated in a cover up of the abortions.

On 3 May 1945 a message from Major General Stanley Eric Reinhart’s 261st Infantry Regiment stated at 3:15 am: "AMG Officer has unconditional surrender of PASSAU signed by Burgermeister, Chief of Police and Lt. Col of Med Corps there. All troops are to turn themselves in this morning."

It was the site of a post World War II American sector displaced persons camp.

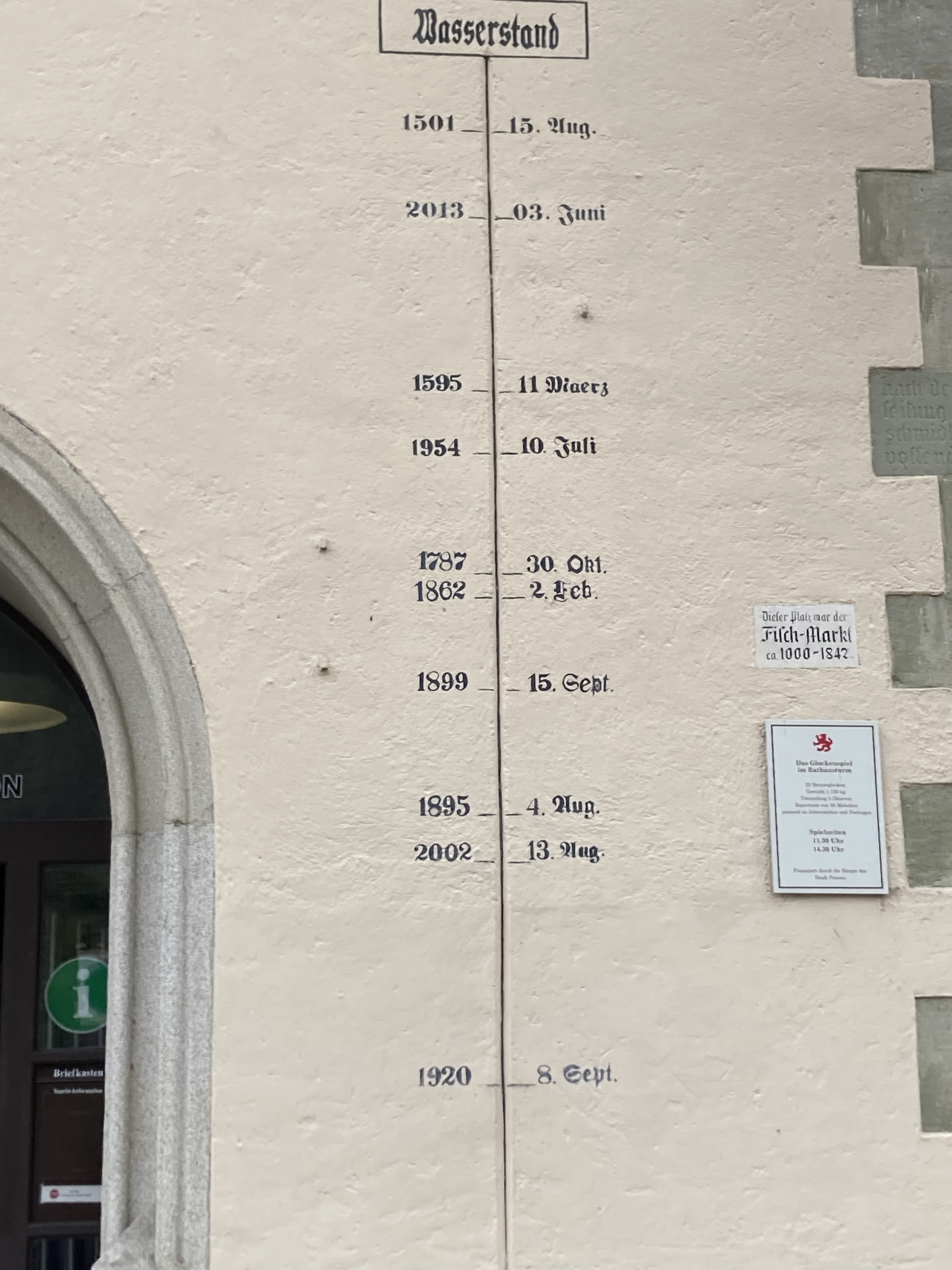
High-water scale 1501–2024 at Passau as of September 2, 2024

On 2 June 2013, the old town suffered from severe flooding as a result of several days of rain and its location at the confluence of three rivers. Peak elevations of floods as early as 1501 are displayed on a wall at the Old City Hall. Flood water reaches the base of that wall on average once every 5 years.

== Subdivisions ==
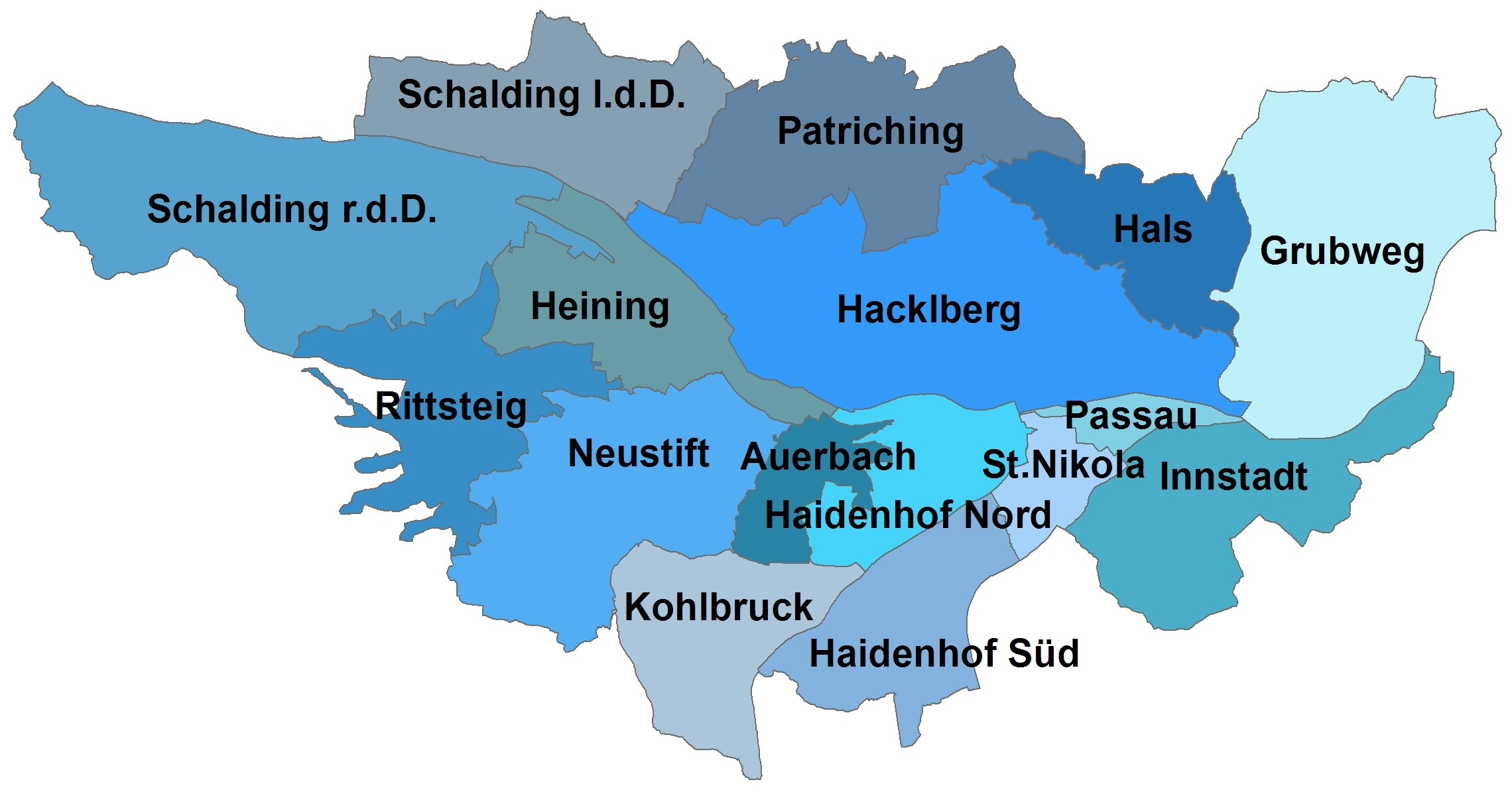
Areas of open council in Passau

Until 2013, the City of Passau was subdivided into eight statistical districts, which in general coincided with formerly separate municipalities. Since 2013, the city is divided in 16 so-called areas of open council (German: Bürgerversammlungsgebiete).

== Main sights ==
Many river cruises down the Danube start at Passau and there is a cycling path all the way down to Vienna. It is on a designated heritage route, the Route of Emperors and Kings.

Passau is notable for its gothic and baroque architecture. The city is dominated by the Veste Oberhaus and the Veste Niederhaus, both parts of the former fortress of the Bishop, on the mountain crest between the Danube and the Ilz.

Tourism in Passau focuses mainly on the three rivers, St. Stephen's Cathedral (German: Der Passauer Stephansdom), and the "Old City" (Die Altstadt).

With 17,774 pipes and 233 registers, the organ at St. Stephen's was long held to be the largest church pipe organ in the world and is today second in size only to the organ at First Congregational Church of Los Angeles, which was expanded in 1994. Organ concerts are held daily between May and September. St. Stephen's is a true masterpiece of Italian Baroque, built by Italian architect Carlo Lurago and decorated in part by Carpoforo Tencalla.

Among many other churches are the Jesuit church of St. Michael, the oldest parish church of St. Paul and the pilgrim church Mariahilf on the hill south of the rivers Inn and Danube.

Before the cathedral is a large square (Domplatz) with the Lamberg-Palais, where the Peace of Passau was concluded. The medieval Old Residence south of the cathedral and the baroque New Residence further west at Residenzplatz were the palaces of the Prince-Bishops within the city. Right beside the 14th century Gothic city hall with its neo-Gothic tower and the big 19th-century former Hauptzollamtsgebäude (Main Customs Office) at the Danube is the Scharfrichterhaus, an important jazz and cabaret stage on which political cabaret is performed.

=== Image gallery ===
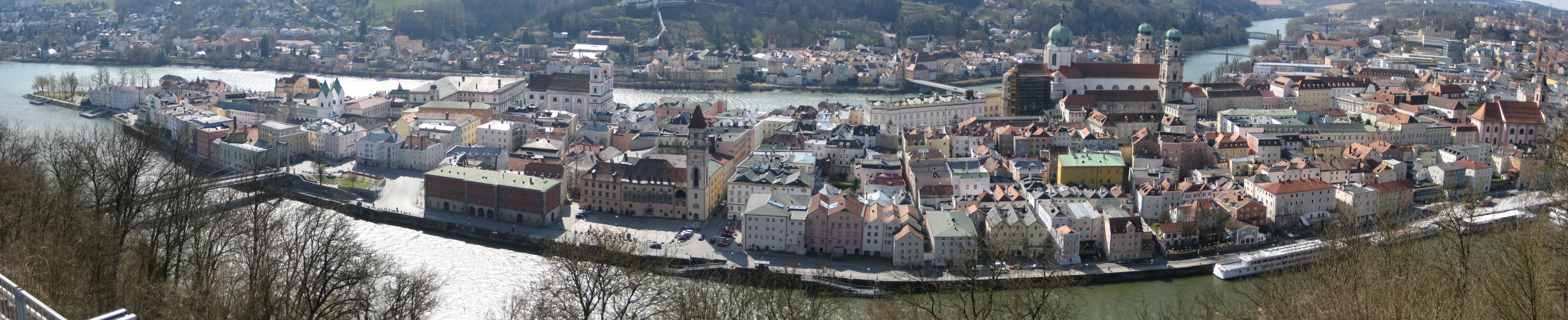
Passau from the Veste Oberhaus, looking across the Danube, March 2007

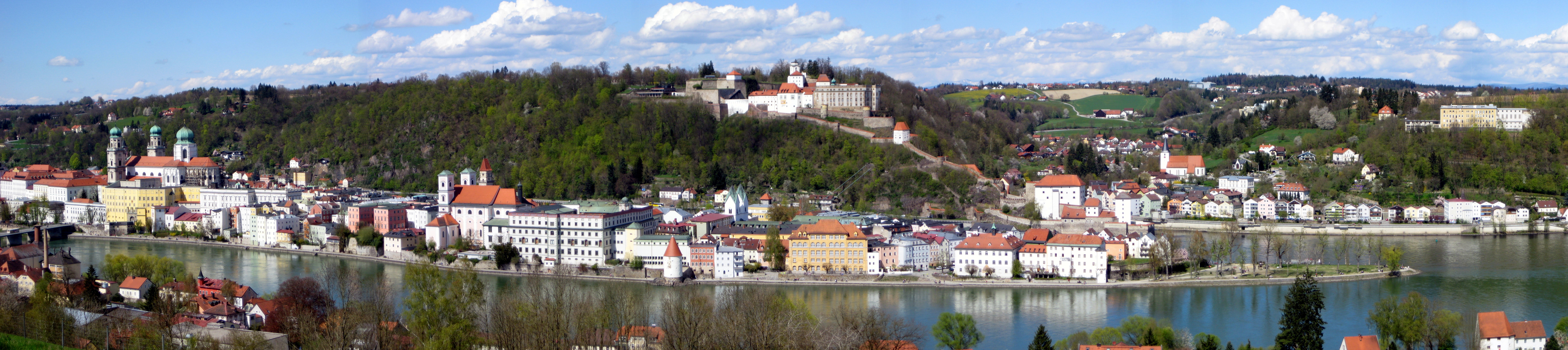
Passau from the south, looking across the river Inn, April 2008

== Migrant entry point ==
Due to its location on the German–Austrian border, and in the south-east of the country, Passau has become a major migrant entry point into Germany. Refugees and economic migrants from the Middle East, Asia and Africa who have reached Europe, often entering either overland via Greece or across the sea via the Mediterranean (see Operation Triton), then head north and sometimes enter Germany. In 2015 the BBC reported that traffickers drive migrants and refugees through Austria and leave them on the side of the autobahn. The migrants and refugees then often walk unaccompanied into Passau, the first German town northwards. This situation has caused the government of Passau to divert funds from flood prevention to housing and feeding the refugees and migrants, around 10% of whom are unaccompanied children.

== Transport ==
The nearest airport is Linz Airport which is located 104 km (65 mi) south east of Passau. However, the airport only provides flights to limited destinations. Generally, residents would use Munich Airport as it provides more domestic and international flights. The airport is located 158 km (98 mi) south west of Passau and it is easily reached by car, bus and train.

== Media ==
Local TV coverage and regional programming is provided by BR which broadcast from Munich. However, the network also has a studio in the city. Niederbayern TV Passau, is regional commercial television station based in Passau.

Local radio is provided by Bayern 1, Unser Radio and Radio Galaxy.

The city is served by the local newspaer,Passauer Neue Presse which publishes daily on print and online.

== Twin towns – sister cities ==
Passau is twinned with:

- Hackensack, United States (1952)
- Cagnes-sur-Mer, France (1973)
- Krems an der Donau, Austria (1974)
- Akita, Japan (1984)
- Málaga, Spain (1987)
- České Budějovice, Czech Republic (1993)
- Liuzhou, China (1999)
- Veszprém, Hungary (1999)
- Montecchio Maggiore, Italy (2003)

== Notable people ==
- Otto of Passau (died after 1383/86), clerical author
- Gottlieb Muffat (1690–1770), organist and composer
- Joseph Ferdinand Damberger (1795–1859), historian
- Joseph Maximilian von Maillinger (1820–1901), general and war minister
- Hans Fruhstorfer (1866–1922), explorer and entomologist
- Georg Philipp Wörlen (1886–1954), painter
- Christian Rub (1886–1956), actor
- Adolf Hitler (1889−1945), lived here in 1892–1894 with his family
- Henry Gerber (1892−1972), early U.S. gay rights activist
- Ludwig Schmidseder (1904–1971), composer and pianist
- Albert Ganzenmüller (1905–1996), Nazi politician
- Alfred Dick (1927–2005), politician
- Nicolaus A. Huber (born 1939), composer
- Heidi Schüller (born 1950), athlete
- Bruno Jonas (born 1952), cabaret artist and actor
- Anna Rosmus (born 1960), author, Third Reich historian
- Andreas Seidl (born 1976), CEO of Sauber Motorsport and former team principal for McLaren
- Andreas Scheuer (born 1974), politician (CSU)
- Florian Silbereisen (born 1981), singer and television presenter
- Gisela Mashayekhi-Beer (born before 1983), Austrian flautist
- Michael Ammermüller (born 1986), race car driver

== Climate ==
Climate data for Passau (Fürstenzell) (1991–2020 normals)
| Month | Jan | Feb | Mar | Apr | May | Jun | Jul | Aug | Sep | Oct | Nov | Dec | Year |
|---|---|---|---|---|---|---|---|---|---|---|---|---|---|
| Mean daily maximum °C (°F) | 1.3 (34.3) | 3.8 (38.8) | 8.8 (47.8) | 14.7 (58.5) | 18.9 (66.0) | 22.5 (72.5) | 24.0 (75.2) | 23.8 (74.8) | 18.8 (65.8) | 13.0 (55.4) | 6.4 (43.5) | 2.3 (36.1) | 13.2 (55.8) |
| Daily mean °C (°F) | −1.2 (29.8) | 0.5 (32.9) | 4.5 (40.1) | 9.5 (49.1) | 13.8 (56.8) | 17.3 (63.1) | 18.6 (65.5) | 18.5 (65.3) | 13.9 (57.0) | 9.0 (48.2) | 3.6 (38.5) | 0.0 (32.0) | 9.0 (48.2) |
| Mean daily minimum °C (°F) | −3.7 (25.3) | −2.6 (27.3) | 0.6 (33.1) | 4.5 (40.1) | 8.8 (47.8) | 12.3 (54.1) | 13.6 (56.5) | 13.5 (56.3) | 9.6 (49.3) | 5.5 (41.9) | 1.1 (34.0) | −2.3 (27.9) | 5.1 (41.2) |
| Average precipitation mm (inches) | 66.5 (2.62) | 57.2 (2.25) | 69.5 (2.74) | 46.4 (1.83) | 93.6 (3.69) | 86.0 (3.39) | 111.0 (4.37) | 92.5 (3.64) | 71.8 (2.83) | 64.0 (2.52) | 56.4 (2.22) | 61.4 (2.42) | 872.4 (34.35) |
| Average precipitation days (≥ 1.0 mm) | 17.4 | 14.6 | 15.2 | 11.8 | 15.6 | 15.5 | 16.5 | 13.8 | 12.9 | 14.8 | 14.2 | 17.5 | 180.2 |
| Average snowy days (≥ 1.0 cm) | 18.2 | 14.7 | 6.8 | 0.2 | 0 | 0 | 0 | 0 | 0 | 0.1 | 3.9 | 11.4 | 55.3 |
| Average relative humidity (%) | 90.2 | 84.1 | 76.5 | 69.1 | 72.1 | 82.5 | 73.8 | 74.6 | 81.3 | 87.2 | 92.2 | 91.9 | 81.3 |
| Mean monthly sunshine hours | 57.0 | 92.9 | 148.4 | 205.5 | 223.8 | 242.8 | 241.6 | 236.6 | 176.1 | 116.0 | 58.3 | 49.2 | 1,846.5 |
Source: World Meteorological Organization

== See also ==
- University of Passau
- Athanor Academy of Performing Arts Passau
