= American Society of Journalists and Authors =

The American Society of Journalists and Authors (ASJA) was founded in 1948 as the Society of Magazine Writers, and is the professional association of independent nonfiction writers in the United States.

== History ==
The organization was established in 1948 as the Society of Magazine Writers. In 1978, membership was expanded to include book authors and the name was changed to ASJA. In March 2009, ASJA changed their policy regarding self-published authors. In June 2015 the membership criteria were revised to include nonfiction writing in more kinds of markets, and non-bylined work as well.

== Objectives ==
ASJA offers members benefits and services focusing on professional development, including confidential market information, meetings with editors, a referral service, seminars and workshops, and discounts. It also offers the opportunity for members to explore professional issues and concerns with their peers via conferences, regional meetings, online forums, and the membership directory.

ASJA represents freelance writers' interests, serving as spokesman for their right to control and profit from uses of their work in new media and otherwise. For example, in 2009, ASJA objected to the Google Book Search Settlement Agreement for authors. ASJA is a member of the Authors Coalition of America which repatriates foreign royalties and distributes them to American writers organizations on the behalf of American writers. All members are automatically enrolled into the Authors Registry.

Services and resources available to the public include publications, events, and mentoring services. Editors and others can search the membership to hire experienced nonfiction writers. Other services include:

- A mentoring program for beginning journalists.
- ASJA Weekly, a free weekly news brief that gathers items of interest to independent writers and others in the fields of publishing, communications, and content marketing.
- The Writers Emergency Assistance Fund (WEAF) offers financial grants to writers in need.
- A database of members available to write on specific nonfiction topics.
- An associated Freelance Writer Search that permits editors and publishers to advertise jobs to the ASJA membership, as well as obtain counseling on writing projects, budgeting, terms, and talent.
- Guidance for freelance writers to help with sticky professional situations, including late or non-payment of fees.

== Awards ==
ASJA administers an annual awards program, judged by selected panels of members. In 2021, ASJA opened most of the competition to non-members, A few categories remain open only to members. All submissions must be for work done on a freelance basis.

The following awards are open to both members and non-members:

- The Arlenes: Given once every three or four years for books that inspire positive action.
- The Donald Robinson Memorial Award for Investigative Journalism.
- Outstanding Article Awards in the following categories: Blogging, Business, Reporting, Personal Essays, Fitness and Sports, food and Drink, Health, How-to, Lifestyle, Opinion/Op-Eds, Profiles, Reported Essays, Science, Social Change, Technology, Trade, Travel.
- Outstanding Book Awards in the following categories: Biography/History, Children/Young Adult Nonfiction, General Nonfiction, Memoir/Autobiography, Service/Self-help.
- Outstanding Content Awards (for work done for brands, businesses, non-profits) in the following categories: Blog Posts or Articles on products and services, Blog Posts or Article focused on subjects other than products and services, Long-form Content (not focused on products or services).

The following awards are open only to ASJA members:

- June Roth Memorial Awards for Outstanding Medical Article and for Medical Book.
- In addition, periodically (based on nominations from members and leadership) ASJA confers awards to members, including awards for extraordinary service, for career achievement, the Conscience-in-Media Award, and others.
