= List of Tiger Cubs (finance) =

The Tiger Cubs are a group of former Tiger Management employees who have since founded their own hedge funds. In addition, there are hedge funds that Tiger Management founder Julian Robertson has invested in known as "Tiger Seeds". Many of the Tiger Cubs are also Tiger Seeds.

== Members ==
=== Tiger Cubs ===
Firm	Founder	Status	Years active
Archegos Capital Management	Bill Hwang	Inactive	2013–2021
Argonaut Capital	David Gerstenhaber	Active	1993–1997, 2000–Present
Bamboo Capital	Quinn Riordan & Paul Spieldenner	Inactive	1999–2004
Banyan Fund Management	RJ McCreary & Sri Wijegoonaratna	Inactive	1997-2004
Blue Ridge Capital	John Griffin	Inactive	1996–2017
Bluestem Asset Management	Michael Bills	Active	2004–Present
Bowman Capital	Lawrence Bowman	Inactive	1999–2005
Claiborne Capital	Kevin Becker	Inactive	2001–2005
Coatue Management	Philippe Laffont	Active	1999–Present
Deerfield Management	Arnold Snider	Active	1994–Present
Discovery Capital Management	Robert Citrone	Active	1999–Present
Duff Capital	Phil Duff	Inactive	2008–2009
Elmwood Advisors	Quinn Riordan	Active	2005–Present
Egerton Capital	William Bollinger	Active	1994–Present
Energy Income Partners	James Murchie	Active	2003–Present
FrontPoint Partners	Philip Duff & Gil Caffray	Inactive	2000–2010
Healthcor	Arthur Cohen	Active	2005–Present
Intrepid Capital Partners	Steve Shapiro	Inactive	1998–2010
Joho Capital	Robert Karr	Inactive	1996–2004
K2 Advisors	David Saunders	Active	1994–Present
Karst Peak Capital	Adam Letizes	Active	2012–Present
Kelusa Capital	RJ McCreary	Inactive	2005-2013
Light Street Capital	Glen Kacher	Active	2010–Present
Lone Pine Capital	Stephen Mandel	Active	1997–Present
Longhorn Capital Partners	Kris Kristynik	Active	2006–Present
Matrix Capital	David Goel	Active	1999–Present
Maverick Capital	Lee Ainslie	Active	1993–Present
Merchants' Gate Capital	Jason Capello	Inactive	2007–2014
Millgate Capital	James Lyle	Inactive	1997–2011
Nezu Asia Capital Management	David Snoddy	Active	2000–Present
North Sound Capital	Tom McAuley	Inactive	1997–2007
Ospraie Management, LLC	Dwight W. Anderson	Active	2004–Present
Pantera Capital	Dan Morehead	Active	2003–Present
Ridgefield Capital Management	Robert Ellis	Active	2004–Present
RoundRock Capital Management	Peter Vig	Active	2001–Present
Second Curve Capital	Tom Brown	Active	2000–Present
Shumway Capital Partners	Chris Shumway	Inactive	2002–2011
Speedwell Advisors	Fuyuki Fujiwara	Inactive	2000–2010
Steadfast Capital Management	Robert Pitts Jr.	Active	1995–Present
Thunderbird Partners	David Fear	Active	2015–Present
Tiger Asia	Bill Hwang	Inactive	2001–2012
Tiger Global Management	Chase Coleman III	Active	2001–Present
Torrey Pines Capital Management	Robert Jafek	Inactive	2002–2010
Toscafund Asset Management	Martin Hughes	Active	2000–Present
Touradji Capital Management	Paul Touradji	Active	2005–Present
Viking Global Investors	Ole Andreas Halvorsen, David Ott & Brian Olson	Active	1999–Present
Williamson McAree Investment Partners	Ed McAree & Robert Williamson	Inactive	2008–2010

=== Tiger Seeds ===
Firm	Founder	Status	Years active
Axial Capital	Marc Andersen & Eliav Assouline	Inactive	2002–2013
Bloom Tree Partners	Alok Agrawal	Active	2008–Present
Cascabel Capital	Scott Sinclair & Laurence Chang	Inactive	2008-2015
Catalpa Capital Advisors	Joseph McAlinden	Active	2007–Present
Centurion Global Advisors	Michael Popow	Inactive	2007–2018
DLH Capital	David Henle	Active	2005–Present
Eastern Advisors	Scott Booth	Inactive	2003–2013
Emerging Sovereign Group	Kevin Kenny, Jason Kirschner & Mete Tuncel	Inactive	2002–2018
Fox Point Fund	Charles Anderson	Active	2006–Present
Green Eagle Credit Fund	Glenn Migliozzi & Dan Sperraza	Inactive	2004–2014
Hound Partners	Jonathan Auerbach & Scott McLellan	Active	2004–Present
Impala Asset Management	Robert Bishop	Inactive	2004–2022
Peak Ten Capital (Formerly Lanexa Global Management)	Ian Murray	Active	2006–Present
Lonestar Capital	Jerome Simon	Inactive	1995–2014
Long Oar Global Partners	James Davidson	Inactive	2009–2015
Maple Leaf Partners	Dane Andreeff	Active	1996–Present
Miura Global Management	Richard Turnure & Pasco Alfaro	Active	2004–Present
North Oak	David Rockwell & Austin Root	Inactive	2009–2013
Pelagic Holdings	McAndrew Rudisill	Inactive	2007–2017
Quest Management	Doug Barnett	Active	1990–Present
Ratan Capital	Nehal Chopra	Active	2009–Present
Sabretooth Capital	Erez Kalir & Craig Perry	Inactive	2009–2012
Salus Alpha Capital	Oliver Prock	Active	2001–present
Samlyn Capital	Robert Pohly	Active	2006–Present
Sparrow Capital	Chris Carroll & A.J. Sechrist	Inactive	2016–2018
Stony Point Capital	Richard J. Walters II	Active	2015–Present
Sun Valley Gold	Peter Palmedo	Active	1992-Present
Teewinot Fund	Michael Moriarty	Active	2003–Present
Tiger Consumer	Pat McCormack	Inactive	2000–2015
Tiger Europe	Elena Piliptchak	Inactive	2008–2012
Tiger Eye Capital	Ben Gambill	Active	2009–Present
Tiger Veda	Manish Chopra	Inactive	2005–2015
TigerShark Capital	Tom Facciola & Michael Sears	Inactive	2001–2015
Titan Capital Partners	Ben Topor	Active	2021–Present
Tyrian Investments	Orlando Muyshondt	Inactive	2010–2016
Venesprie Capital Partners	Quincy Fennebresque	Inactive	2008–2009
Water Street Capital	Gilchrist Berg	Active	1987–Present
Woodson Capital	Jim Davis	Active	2010–Present
WRA Investment Partners	Bill Araskog	Inactive	2003–2013
Yarra Square Partners (Formerly Sutton Square)	Victor Ho	Active	2019–Present
YG Partners	Jason Young	Inactive	2013–2017
Yulan Capital Management	Lilian Zhou	Inactive	2013–2023

=== Tiger Grand Cubs ===
Firm	Founder	Status	Years active	Parent
10x10y	Shayan Mozaffar	Active	2021–Present	Woodson Capital
Addition	Lee Fixel	Active	2020–Present	Tiger Global
Alpha Wave Global (Formerly Falcon Edge Capital)	Rick Gerson	Active	2011–Present	Blue Ridge
Al Waha Capital	Joseph Zhang, Leo Tian	Active	2024–Present	Tiger Asia
Anomaly Capital	Ben Jacobs	Active	2019–Present	Viking Global Investors
Aragon Capital	Anne Dias	Inactive	2001–2011	Viking Global Investors
Ardmore Road Asset Management	Chris Connor	Active	2020-Present	FrontPoint Partners
Asian Century Quest	Brian Kelly	Inactive	2005–2014	Maverick
Avala Global	Divya Nettimi	Active	2021–Present	Viking Global Investors
Azora Capital	Ravi Chopra	Active	2016–Present	Samlyn Capital
Banbury Partners	Baker Burleson & Stormy Scott	Active	2014–Present	Fox Point
Bayberry Capital	Angela Aldrich	Active	2018–Present	Blue Ridge
BlueMar Capital	David Rodriguez-Fraile	Active	2011–Present	Shumway Capital
Boodell & Co.	Peter Boodell	Active	2011–Present	Eastern Advisors
Boothbay Fund Management	Ari Glass	Active	2014–Present	Intrepid
Bridger Capital	Roberto Mignone	Active	2000–Present	Blue Ridge
Cahera Capital	Ahmed Elcott	Inactive	2014–2017	Samlyn Capital
Cavalry Asset Management	John Hurley	Active	2003–Present	Bowman
Canaan Valley Capital	Matthew Crakes	Active	2015–Present	Shumway Capital
Cat Rock Capital Management	Alexander Captain	Active	2015–Present	Tiger Global
Center Pond Management	Noah Yosha & Steve Muscemi	Inactive	2015–2017	Healthcor
Charter Bridge Capital	Brian Zied	Inactive	2010–2015	Maverick
Cider Mill Investments	Tom Wilcox	Active	2016–Present	Shumway Capital
Cobia Capital	Jeffrey Meyers	Active	2008–Present	Intrepid
Conatus Capital Management	David Stemerman	Inactive	2007–2017	Lone Pine Capital
Cowbird Capital	Scott Coulter	Inactive	2017–2024	Lone Pine Capital
D1 Capital Partners	Daniel Sundheim	Active	2018–Present	Viking Global Investors
Deep Creek Capital	Josh Abramowitz	Active	2009–Present	Viking Global Investors
Dialectic Capital	John Fichthorn	Inactive	2013–2017	Maverick
Dilation Capital	Brian Eizenstat	Active	2019–Present	Lone Pine Capital
Dockyard Capital Management	Ben Balbale	Active	2017–Present	Matrix Capital
Durant Partners	Justin Udelhofen	Active	2016–Present	Water Street Capital
Eastwind Global	Naveen Choudary	Active	2012–Present	Shumway Capital
Electron Capital	Jos Shaver	Active	2012–Present	Intrepid
Emrys Partners	Steve Eisman	Inactive	2011–2014	Duff
Encompass Capital	Todd Kantor	Active	2014–Present	Touradji Capital
Eudaemonic Capital	Chris White	Inactive	2010–2013	Elmwood Advisors
Floating Capital	Gaurav Gupta	Active	2022–Present	Light Street Capital
Foxhaven Asset Management	Mike Pausic	Active	2013–Present	Maverick
General Equity Holdings	Andrew Bellas	Active	2015–Present	Tiger Global
Glade Brook Capital	Paul Hudson	Inactive	2011–2016	Shumway Capital
Goodwood Capital Management	Ryan Thibodeaux	Active	2012–Present	Maple Leaf Partners
Goshen Global	Christopher Burn	Inactive	2006–2014	Eastern Advisors
Grays Peak Capital	Scott Stevens	Active	2015–Present	Coatue
Greyhound Asia Fund	Sergej Belozorov	Active	2012–Present	Quest Management
Half Sky Capital	Li Ran	Active	2016–Present	Lone Pine Capital
Harbor Spring Capital	Amit Doshi	Active	2012–Present	Tiger Global
Highside Capital Management	Lee Hobson	Inactive	2003–2013	Maverick
Hoplite Capital	John Lykouretzos	Inactive	2003–2019	Viking Global Investors
Islander Capital Partners	David Semenza & Jordan Martinez	Active	2023–Present	Matrix Capital
JAT Capital	John Thaler	Inactive	2007–2015	Shumway Capital
Junto Capital	James Parsons	Active	2015–Present	Viking Global Investors
Kaleido Capital Partners	Mukund Bhaskar & Young Peck	Active	2023–Present	Karst Peak Capital
Kavi Asset Management	Manny Singh	Active	2015–Present	Eastern Advisors
Krainos Capital	Paul Enright	Active	2017–Present	Viking Global Investors
Kylin Management	Ted Kang	Active	2006–Present	Tiger Asia
Latimer Light Capital	Scott Phillips	Inactive	2015–2018	Lone Pine Capital
Lone Star Value Management	Jeff Eberwein	Active	2013–Present	Viking Global Investors
LRV Capital Management	Craig Lottner, Mark Rooney & Erik Van Der Sande	Inactive	2010–2018	Maverick
Marble Arch Investments	Tim Jenkins	Inactive	2007–2018	Hound Partners
March Altus Capital	Neil Shah	Inactive	2012–2015	Shumway Capital
Marnell Management	Steve Rosenberg	Active	2016–Present	Viking Global Investors
Masterton Capital Management	Steve Mykijewycz	Active	2019–Present	Viking Global Investors
Mojave Fund	Michael Beebe	Inactive	2009–2014	Viking Global Investors
Monolit Capital Management	Vadim Kovshov	Active	2015–Present	Discovery
MSMB Capital	Martin Skhreli	Inactive	2009–2012	Intrepid
Night Square Capital / Night Squared	Neel Parekh & Michael Berkley	Inactive	2015-2017, 2024-Present	Tiger Consumer
Oribel Capital	Adam Brenner	Active	2015–Present	Intrepid
Panda Global	Mark Landis	Inactive	2010–2011	Touradji Capital
Panvira	Vaibhav Singh	Active	2025–Present	Coatue
ROAM Global Management	Rishi Renjen	Active	2018–Present	Maverick
Sabrelane Capital	Pavlo Chikosh	Active	2018–Present	Matrix Capital
Sanoor Capital Management	Jasjit Rekhi	Active	2015–Present	Discovery
Schroer Capital	John Schroer	Inactive	2009–2013	Healthcor
Scoperta Capital Management	Gail Gonul Bicici	Active	2014–Present	Discovery
Serenity Capital	Wang Chen	Active	2016–Present	Tiger Global
ShawSpring Partners	Dennis Hong	Active	2014–Present	Matrix Capital
ShearLink Capital	Vivek Mehta & Aaron Husock	Inactive	2012–2017	Viking Global Investors & Lanexa
Slate Path Capital	David Greenspan	Active	2012–Present	Blue Ridge
Solomon Global	Shayan Mozaffar	Inactive	2014–2017	Tyrian Investments
SRS Investment Management	Karthik Sarma	Active	2007–Present	Tiger Global
Surayna Capital Management	Anu Murgai	Inactive	2007–2012	Shumway Capital
Sylebra Capital Management	Jeff Fieler & Daniel Gibson	Active	2011–Present	Coatue
Tappestry Energy Partners	Mike Tapp	Inactive	2006–2011	Roundrock Capital Management
Teng Yue Partners	Tao Li	Active	2011-Present	Tiger Asia
Tensor Edge Capital	Romit Shah	Active	2025-Present	Matrix Capital
Tide Point Capital	Christopher Windham	Inactive	2012–2018	Shumway Capital
Tiger Legatus Capital	Jesse Ro	Active	2009–Present	Viking Global Investors
Tiger Pacific Capital	Run Ye, Junji Takegami & Hoyon Hwang	Active	2012–Present	Tiger Asia
Totem Point Management	Neal Nathani	Active	2013–Present	Axial
Tracer Capital	Riley McCormack & Matt Hastings	Inactive	2004–2010	Coatue
Trenchant Capital Management	Tyson Strauser	Inactive	2017–2018	Samlyn Capital
Trend Capital Management	Ashwin Vasan	Active	2011–Present	Shumway Capital
Tri Locum Partners	Prashanth Jayaram	Active	2020–Present	Maverick
Tybourne Capital	Eashwar Krishnan	Active	2012–Present	Lone Pine Capital
Untitled Investments	Neeraj Chandra	Active	2020-Present	Tiger Global Management
Valiant Capital	Chris Hansen	Active	2008–Present	Blue Ridge
Vollero Beach	Robert Vollero & Gentry Beach	Inactive	2009–2016	Touradji Capital
Voyager Global	Grant Wonders	Active	2021-Present	Viking Global Investors
Washington Harbour Partners	Mina Faltas	Active	2019–Present	Viking Global Investors
White Elm Capital	Matthew Iorio	Active	2007–Present	Lone Pine Capital
Wolfacre Global Management	Jon Ylvisaker	Active	2009–2018	Miura Global Partners
YX Funds	Shannon Collins	Active	2019–Present	Water Street Capital

=== Tiger Great-Grand Cubs ===
Firm	Founder	Status	Years Active	Parent
Amber Road Investors	Sinan Xin	Active	2023–Present	Emerging Sovereign Group
Anatole Investment Management	George Yang	Active	2016-Present	Alpha Wave (Formerly Falcon Edge)
Atalan Capital Partners	David Thomas	Active	2014–Present	Highside Capital
Avanto Partners	Thomas Cosper	Active	2022–Present	Bayberry Capital
Cloverdale Capital Partners	Jonathan Gattman	Active	2014–Present	Highside Capital
Colliery Capital	Vincent Ferraro	Active	2015–Present	Hoplite
Emerson Point Capital	Amir Mokari	Active	2018–Present	Conatus
Highside Global Management	Zach Petrone	Active	2015–Present	Highside Capital
Plymouth Lane	Jonathan Salinas	Inactive	2013–2016	Marble Arch
Saferidge Capital Partners	Paul Saferstein	Inactive	2014–2017	Asian Century Quest
Saola Capital	George Kim	Active	2016–Present	Kylin
Stony Point Capital	Richard J. Walters II	Active	2015–Present	JAT Capital
Tower Road Capital	Jason Wulf	Active	2018–Present	Hoplite
Trail Creek Capital	David Strine	Active	2019–Present	Impala
Triata Capital	Sean Ho	Active	2020–Present	Tybourne Capital
Valinor Management	David Gallo	Active	2007–Present	Bridger Capital
Yarra Square Capital	Victor Ho	Active	2018–Present	Conatus
Crow's Nest Holdings	John Carrington	Active	2021–Present	Hound Partners

== See also ==
- Tiger Management
- Julian Robertson
