= Tiger Cub =

Tiger cub refers to the infant of the feline Panthera tigris; for other uses, with full capitalization, see:

- Tiger Cub Developments Sherwood Ranger, an aircraft manufactured by a small-scale British aircraft manufacturer/producer
- Tiger Cub Economies, a collective term for the five major economies of South-East Asia
- Tiger Cubs, the junior section of the Boy Scouts of America
- Tiger Cubs (finance), a group of former Tiger Management employees who have since founded their own hedge funds
- Tiger Cubs (TV series), a 2012 Hong Kong police procedural series
- Triumph Tiger Cub, a British motorcycle from 1950s until late 1960s
