= Dwight W. Anderson =

American hedge fund manager

- Born: Dwight W. Anderson
- Education: Princeton University; UNC Kenan–Flagler Business School
- Occupation: Founder of Ospraie Management, LLC

Dwight W. Anderson is an American investor and the founder of Ospraie Management, LLC, a basic industries and commodities-focused asset management firm with a venture arm focused on investments in the agriculture sector.

== Education ==
Anderson graduated from Horace Greeley High School in Chappaqua, New York in 1985. After graduation he attended Princeton University where he received an AB in History in 1989. In 1994, Anderson earned an MBA from the University of North Carolina. While at UNC, he received a graduate scholarship funded by Julian Robertson. He is the recipient of the University of North Carolina’s Kenan-Flagler Young Alumni Award (2000) and MBA Alumni Merit Award (2007).

== Career ==
Following business school, Anderson worked at Goldman Sachs and JPMorgan and then was recruited by Julian Robertson to join Tiger Management in October 1994, where he served as Managing Director responsible for the Basic Industries and Commodities Group. Anderson is known as a “Tiger Cub,” a name given to alumni of Tiger Management who have since started their own funds. In 1999, Anderson later joined Tudor Investment Corporation, where he served as Head of the Basic Industries Group.

Later in 1999, Anderson launched Ospraie as an independent commodities hedge fund within Tudor Investment Corporation. In 2004, he established Ospraie as an independent firm, with $1.2 billion in assets under management. Ospraie invests in commodity markets and basic industries worldwide based on fundamental, bottom-up research, and at its peak, it managed assets totaling nearly $9 billion.

In 2018, Anderson launched Ospraie Ag Science, Ospraie Management’s venture arm dedicated to the agriculture sector. As of March 2021, this venture arm managed $137.9 million.

== Personal ==
Anderson is Chairman of the Board of Directors for Concord Resources Limited, a global commodities trading company. He also serves on the Board of Trustees of NYU Langone Medical Center and UNC Kenan Flagler Business School.
