= K2 Advisors =

American fund of hedge funds

- Type: Private
- Industry: Investment Management
- Founded: 1994; 32 years ago
- Founders: David Saunders; William Douglass
- Defunct: October 2024; 1 year ago
- Fate: Acquired by Franklin Templeton. Brand name removed in 2024.
- Headquarters: Stamford, Connecticut, U.S.
- Products: Fund of hedge funds

K2 Advisors was an American fund of funds investment firm headquartered in Stamford, Connecticut. It was one of the largest fund of hedge funds in the United States. It was acquired by Franklin Templeton.

== Background ==
K2 advisors was founded in 1994 by David Saunders and William Douglass. The firm was named after the K2 mountain in the Karakoram range where the pair attended a fundraiser to benefit a team to climb it. Saunders previously worked for Julian Robertson at the firm Tiger Management as Head Trader making K2 Advisors part of the Tiger Cubs group. Douglass previously worked at Donaldson, Lufkin & Jenrette.

Since 2006, K2 Advisors has been known to be investing in ESG securities as well as Insurance-Linked Securities.

In 2007 TA Associates acquired a minority interest in K2 advisors for an undisclosed amount of money.

In 2011, K2 Advisors considered selling the firm with The Carlyle Group being one of the main bidding frontrunners.

In 2012, K2 Advisors was acquired by Franklin Templeton Investments. K2 Advisors used the money from deal to buy out TA Associates stake which allowed Franklin Templeton Investments to have 100% ownership of K2 Advisors.

In 2019, K2 Advisors expanded its business to Europe with a new fund range which allowed local investors there to have access to U.S.-based fund managers.

In October 2024, K2 Advisors ceased to exist as a separate brand under Franklin Templeton and was rebranded to Absolute Return Portfolio Management Team.
