= David Goel =

American hedge fund manager (born 1970)

David E. Goel
- Born: 1970 (age 55–56); Toronto, Ontario, Canada
- Citizenship: United States
- Education: Harvard University (BA)
- Occupation: Investor
- Known for: Founder of Matrix Capital Management LLC
- Board member of: Phillips Exeter Academy; Popular, Inc. Adaptive Biotechnologies; Univision Communications

Goel was born in Toronto, Ontario, and is primarily known as a U.S. equity securities investor. Goel is also a protégé of hedge fund manager Julian Robertson.

In August 2024, Goel announced he would be closing Matrix Capital Management due to health issues.

== Biography ==
Goel was born in Toronto, Ontario, though he is known primarily as a U.S. equity securities investor. He became a naturalized U.S. citizen in 2013.

A 1989 graduate of Phillips Exeter Academy and a 1993 graduate of Harvard University, Goel studied international relations and majored in government. After graduating university, he went to work as a financial analyst at Morgan Stanley & Co. in its High Technology Investment Banking division. From 1995 to 1996, he worked as a financial analyst at the multibillion-dollar private equity fund General Atlantic Partners. In 1996, he left General Atlantic to become an analyst and later partner at Tiger Management, where he was mentored by Julian Robertson. Goel then began his own fund, Matrix Capital Management, in 1999. Tiger Management closed down and returned all monies to investors in 2000. Thus, Goel is counted among the “Tiger Cubs,” a designation for former Tiger Management employees who started successful hedge funds.

== Investment strategy ==
Like other Tiger alumni, Goel is known for fundamentals-focused growth investing. The time horizons of Goel's investments are typically long-term, and he has been quoted as saying that, when evaluating a stock portfolio's performance, “I think in 10-year terms.” Goel's investment strategy has been cited as an exemplar both of company-specific microeconomic research and for its use of market analysis, including DeMark Indicators.

Goel's hedge fund, Matrix Capital Management, is registered with the U.S. Securities and Exchange Commission and as a result, its investment strategies are a matter of public record. For the past 14 years, Goel's fund has invested in public companies predominantly within the technology, media, telecommunications, and consumer staples sectors. Matrix Capital has even been the subject of a prominent case study at the Harvard Business School. When Goel and Ferri co-founded the fund in 1999, it was arranged that Goel would manage its day-to-day functions. Thus, Matrix Capital is not to be confused with Ferri's separate venture capital firm Matrix Partners, which has made early stage investments in young, private companies over the past 36 years that include Apple, SanDisk, Gilt Groupe, and others.

Through Matrix Capital Management's investments, Goel received attention in 2012 for his early support of cloud computing ventures. Goel was quoted as saying these investments were predicated on “the disruptive power of cloud computing across the technology universe” and that each would be “a harbinger for where all software companies will have to go if they want to remain relevant.” In the case of Rod Drury’s accounting software company Xero, for instance, Matrix Capital Management purchased approximately 10% of the company.

== Philanthropy and other affiliations ==
Goel is an active philanthropist and serves on a number of boards at educational institutions and foundations for the arts. A lifelong beneficiary of scholarships and financial aid, he became an advisor for Harvard University's Weatherhead Center for International Affairs (where he studied as an undergraduate) from 2006 to 2008, has been a Trustee of the Meadowbrook School since 2009, and was elected as a Trustee of Phillips Exeter Academy in May 2013. He has served as a Trustee of the Museum of Fine Arts, Boston since 2010, where he and his wife, Stacey, donated a gallery in the museum's New American Wing. He is also on the board of trustees for American Repertory Theater.

Goel currently serves on the board of Directors of Popular, Inc., a publicly traded financial holding company with more than $45 billion in consolidated assets. In 2013, Popular shareholders reelected him by a majority of 98%.

Goel and his wife made a $100 million gift to Harvard University in 2019 to fund its arts campus in Allston.
