= Bill Hwang =

American convicted fraudster

- Born: Sung Kook Hwang; 1964 (age 61–62); South Korea
- Education: University of California, Los Angeles (BA); Carnegie Mellon University (MBA)
- Occupations: Investor; trader; convicted fraudster
- Known for: Archegos Capital Management's 2021 collapse
- Spouse: Becky Hwang
- Children: 1 daughter

Korean name
- Hangul: 황성국
- Hanja: 黃城國
- RR: Hwang Seongguk
- MR: Hwang Sŏngguk

Sung Kook Hwang (Korean: 황성국; Hanja: 黃城國), also known as Bill Hwang, is an American investor, trader and convicted fraudster. He ran Archegos Capital Management, whose default on March 26, 2021 caused major losses to several notable investment banks. In April 2021, The Wall Street Journal reported that Hwang had lost US$20 billion over 10 days in late March, imposing large losses on his bankers Nomura and Credit Suisse, and contributing to the collapse of Credit Suisse. In July 2024, he was convicted on federal charges of fraud and racketeering, and in November 2024, he was sentenced to 18 years in prison. As of March 2026, he is free on bail while appealing his conviction.

== Early life ==
Hwang was born in South Korea in 1964. He immigrated to Las Vegas in 1982 with his parents. In 1983, Hwang and his mother moved to Los Angeles after the death of his father in 1983. He worked night shifts at McDonalds to support his family and fund his education.

Hwang earned a Bachelor of Arts in economics/business from the University of California, Los Angeles, and a Master of Business Administration from the Tepper School of Business at Carnegie Mellon University.

== Career ==
Hwang began his career at Hyundai Securities in New York, then worked at the now defunct Peregrine Investments Holdings, where he met billionaire hedge fund manager Julian Robertson, who was a client and went to work for Robertson's Tiger Management. Robertson closed the fund in 2000. Still, during his time as its owner, he'd provided some of whom he considered to be his most promising employees, known as the "Tiger Cubs", with funding to start their hedge funds. Robertson gave Hwang a starting capital of about $25 million to launch his own Tiger Asia Management fund, which grew to over $5 billion at its peak, before suffering "heavy losses" during the 2007–09 Great Recession.

== Insider trading ==
In 2012, Tiger Asia Management and Hwang admitted to illegally using inside information to trade Chinese bank stocks and agreed to criminal and civil settlements totaling more than US$60 million. Tiger Asia Management, Hwang, Tiger Asia Partners, and former head trader Raymond Park also paid US$44 million in penalties to the Securities and Exchange Commission.

In October 2014, Hwang was banned from trading in Hong Kong for four years, after he admitted to trading Chinese bank stocks using insider information.

== Archegos Capital ==
In 2012, Hwang closed Tiger Asia Management, and opened a "family office," which is less regulated than a hedge fund, named Archegos Capital Management. The company managed US$10 billion of funds.

Through the usage of total return swaps, Archegos was able to take highly leveraged positions across multiple companies, as the banks that issued the swaps held the shares on behalf of Archegos. By using swaps, Archegos could circumvent certain disclosure requirements, keeping the scale of its market exposure largely hidden from the public and regulators. In March 2021, losses at Archegos triggered the default and liquidation of positions approaching $30 billion in value, leading to "substantial" losses for Nomura, Credit Suisse, Goldman Sachs, and Morgan Stanley. The firm had held prominent positions in ViacomCBS, Baidu, Vipshop, Farfetch, and others. Before the Archegos collapse, Hwang was believed to be worth $10–15 billion, with his investments leveraged at 5:1.

In March 2021, as Archegos Capital Management faced mounting margin calls due to declining stock prices, several prime brokers, including UBS and Credit Suisse, urged Bill Hwang to liquidate positions to mitigate losses. Despite these appeals, Hwang remained confident in his strategy and resisted immediate liquidation. On a conference call with major banks, he expressed optimism about quickly unwinding positions and restoring stability. However, the situation deteriorated rapidly, leading to forced liquidations and significant financial repercussions for the involved banks.

In November 2021, Credit Suisse, having taken a hit of $5.5 billion from the Archegos losses, shut down its prime brokerage business. Texas Capital Bancshares Inc, in which Archegos held a 20% share, plunged after Archegos's collapse.

In January 2024, Hwang sought to block prosecutors from introducing large quantities of trading data at his upcoming trial, citing their "grave failure" in withholding the data for 17 months.

== Indictment, conviction and sentencing ==
On April 27, 2022, Hwang and his former top lieutenant, Patrick Halligan, were arrested and charged with racketeering, conspiracy, securities fraud, and wire fraud as part of a scheme to harm investors. In a 59-page indictment, Manhattan federal prosecutors alleged that Hwang and Halligan schemed to manipulate stock prices. Lawyers for Hwang and Halligan stated that they were innocent of the charges in the indictment. Hwang was released on a $100 million bond, which was secured by two properties and $5 million in cash. Halligan was released on a $1 million bond.

In September 2022, District Judge Alvin Hellerstein set October 2023 as the trial month for Hwang and Halligan, both of whom pleaded not guilty. Former Archegos head trader William Tomita and ex-Chief Risk Officer Scott Becker both pleaded guilty and agreed to testify against Hwang and Halligan. The trial was delayed to February 2024, then to May 2024. On July 10, 2024, a 12-person jury in a federal court in Manhattan found him guilty on 10 out of 11 counts of securities fraud, wire fraud, conspiracy, racketeering, and market manipulation.

News of Hwang’s indictment and the collapse of Archegos Capital attracted significant attention in South Korea, his birthplace, where media outlets extensively covered the event as a high-profile case of a Korean-American financier’s fall from prominence in the U.S. financial sector.

On November 11, 2024, Bob Foresman, a former vice chair of UBS, advocated for leniency on behalf of Hwang's case, citing that Hwang's devotion towards his faith and his philanthropic efforts had been ignored in the trial.

On November 20, 2024, Hwang was sentenced to 18 years in prison. In response to Hwang's attorneys' request for no prison time, US attorney Mark Thomas described Hwang as a “recidivist,” and Judge Hellerstein noted such a request to be "ridiculous." He went on to say that Hwang's sentence was a "symbol to others that if you don't live by the law, you could be punished very severely by the law." The next day Judge Hellerstein said he would “consider” reducing the prison sentence for Hwang to 11.5 years after his lawyer Barry Berke advocated for serving 6.5 years in home confinement.

In January 2026, Reuters reported that Hwang was seeking a presidential pardon for his conviction. As of March 2026, he is free on bail, while appealing his conviction.

== Personal life ==
Hwang is a Christian and his father was a pastor. Hwang and his wife reside in Tenafly, New Jersey and they have a daughter who attended Fordham University in New York City. Despite his immense wealth, Hwang lived modestly, driving a Hyundai SUV and focusing on his faith and relationship with God—a continuation of his upbringing as the son of a pastor. He hosted regular Scripture readings at his foundation’s Midtown Manhattan offices and supported sessions at Metro Community Church. He explained his approach, stating, "I try to invest according to the word of God and the power of the Holy Spirit." This spiritual perspective allegedly influenced both his personal life and investment philosophy, reflecting his claimed commitment to living out his faith.

In November 2024, Hwang stated that his net worth was $55 million, significantly less than the $30 billion during his peak.

== Philanthropy ==
Hwang co-founded the Grace and Mercy Foundation, a charitable organization, which, by 2018, had reportedly "more than US$500 million in assets." Hwang has been noted as one of the largest benefactors of Christian evangelical organizations and causes. Through the Grace and Mercy Foundation, Hwang has made large contributions to Christian organizations such as Focus on the Family, the Museum of the Bible, The King's College, and megachurches such as Brooklyn Tabernacle, Redeemer Presbyterian Church, and Ravi Zacharias International Ministries.

== See also ==
- Koreans in New York City
