= Viking Global Investors =

American hedge fund firm

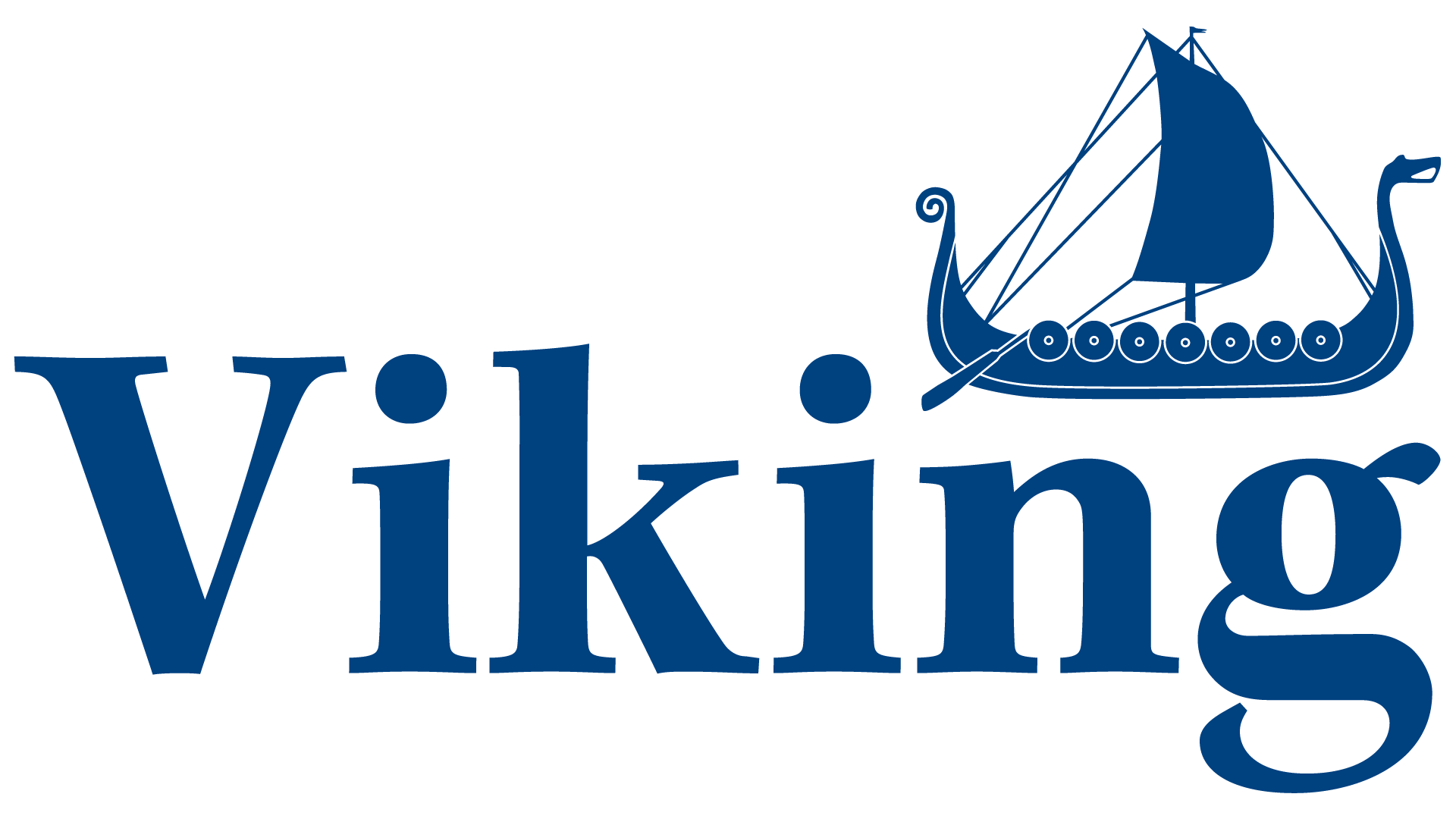
- Type: Private
- Industry: Investment management
- Founded: October 1999; 27 years ago
- Founder: Ole Andreas Halvorsen, CEO and risk manager, Brian T Olson and David C Ott
- Headquarters: Stamford, Connecticut, US
- AUM: US$59 billion (31 March 2021)
- Website: www.vikingglobal.com

Viking Global Investors is an American investment management firm headquartered in Stamford, Connecticut that specializes in long-short equity, long-only equity, and private equity strategies.

== History ==
It was established in October 1999 by its CEO and risk manager, Ole Andreas Halvorsen, Brian T Olson and David C Ott.

Ole Andreas Halvorsen previously worked for Julian Robertson at the firm Tiger Management, making Viking one of the 30 or more so-called "Tiger Cubs," funds founded by managers who started their investment careers with Tiger Management.

In June 2017, Viking announced that it was returning $8 billion to investors to "reset to a smaller size."

Viking was headquartered in Stamford, Connecticut as of 2023, with offices in New York, Hong Kong, London, and San Francisco.

In February 2025, U.S.-based Viking Global built a new $526 million new position in Boeing while also investing in General Motors. Viking also bolstered its financial sectors in Bank of America, Charles Schwab and JPMorgan.

== Investment strategy ==
The firm invests in public equities via a long-short strategy as well as a long-only strategy. The firm invests in private equity via a hybrid strategy, which combines private equity investments with a public equities strategy, and a strategy that invests exclusively in private assets. The firm also expanded into making credit and structured capital investments.
