= Lone Pine Capital =

American hedge fund

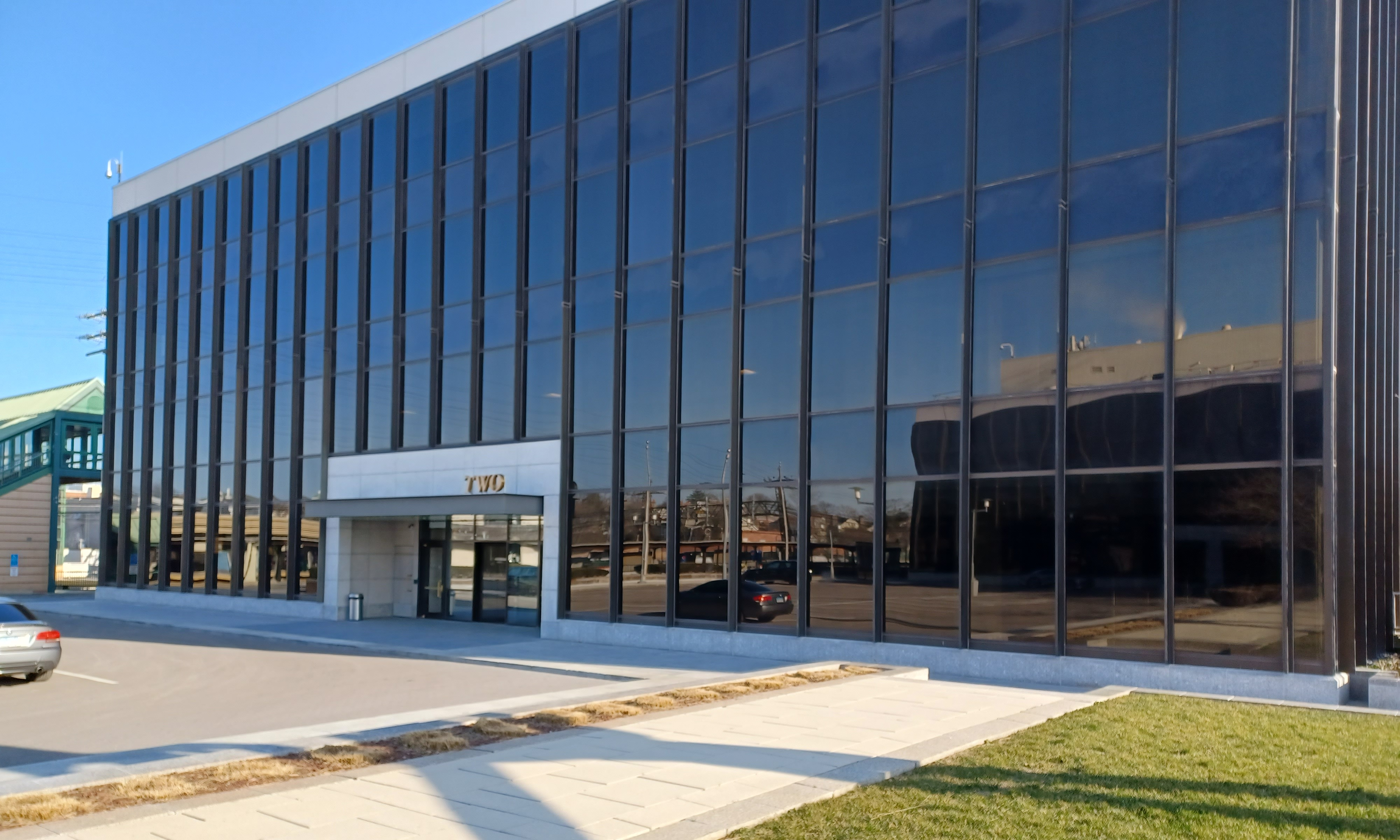
- Headquarters in Greenwich, Connecticut, US
- Type: Private company
- Industry: Investment fund
- Founded: 1997
- Founder: Stephen Mandel
- Headquarters: Greenwich, Connecticut, US
- Products: Hedge fund
- AUM: US$19 billion (2025)
- Website: www.lonepinecapital.com

Lone Pine Capital is an American-based hedge fund and investment advisor headquartered in Greenwich, Connecticut. The firm has offices in London, New York City, and San Francisco.

== History ==
Lone Pine Capital was established in 1997 by its president and portfolio manager, Stephen Mandel. The firm was named after a pine tree on the Dartmouth College campus that survived a lightning strike in 1887.

Mandel previously worked for Julian Robertson at the firm Tiger Management, making Lone Pine one of the 30 or more so-called "Tiger Cubs", funds founded by managers who started their investment careers with Tiger Management. Mandel led the firm until January 2019, when he stepped back from day-to-day activity into a mentorship role with less investment oversight.

As of October 2025, Lone Pine Capital reported $19 billion under management.

== Investment strategy ==
Lone Pine Capital's investment vehicles include the Lone Cypress hedge fund, its flagship fund, and its long-only Lone Cascade strategy. As of 2024, the Cascade strategy held a majority of the firm's assets.

Between 2021 and 2023, the firm shifted its focus to investments in publicly traded companies, but resumed private investments in April 2024 when it acquired a minority stake in Canva and Spotnana Technology.

In 2025, Lone Pine launched its Lone Mountain Pine fund, which invests in companies "capable of consistent long-term compounding" and with positions held for five years or longer. Lone Pine committed $500 million of its own capital towards the fund and will begin accepting external investors in January 2026.
