= Horace Greeley High School =

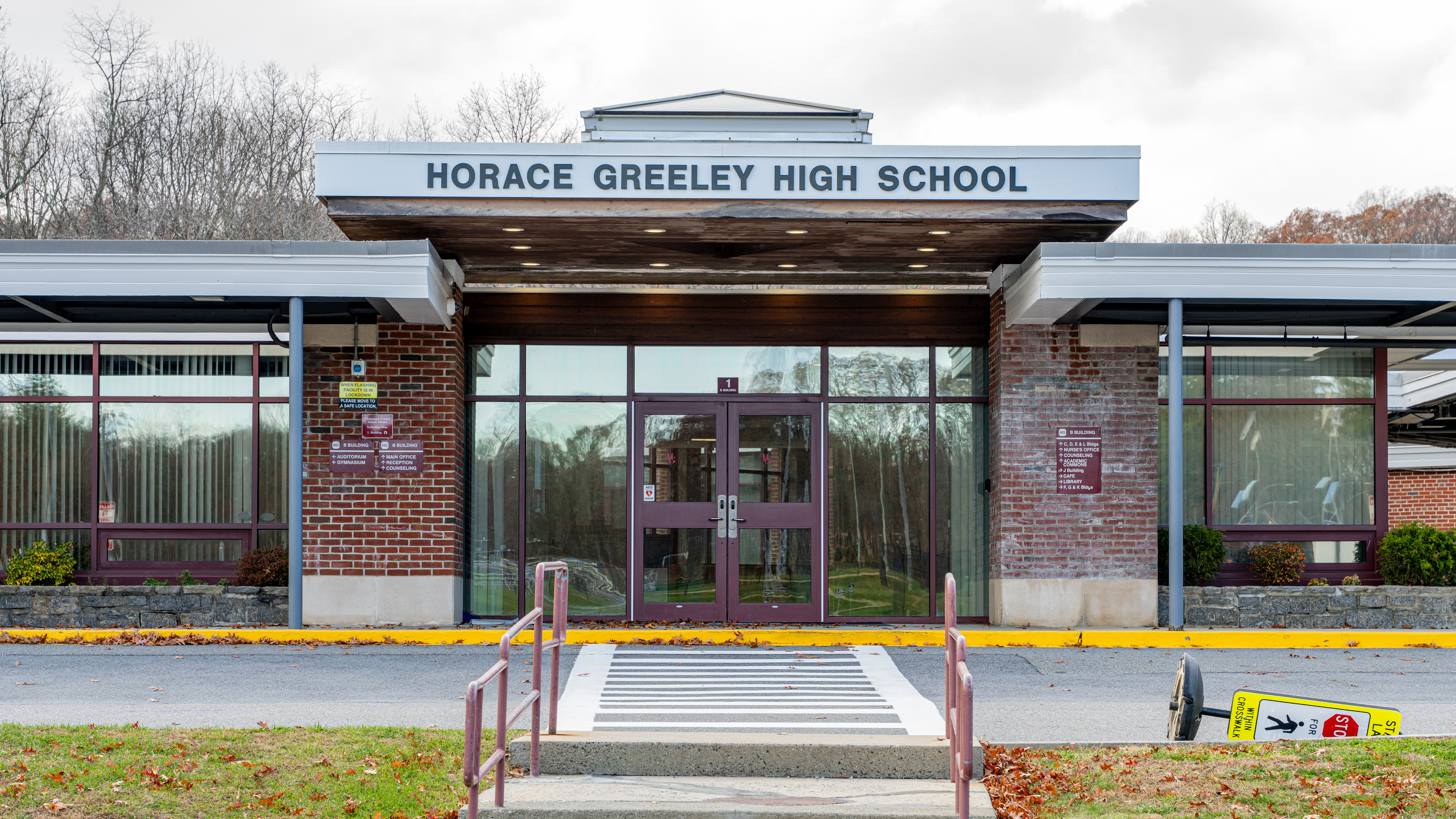

Location
- 70 Roaring Brook Road; Chappaqua, Westchester, New York 10514; United States; 41°10′28″N 73°45′24″W

Information
- School type: Public Public high school
- Motto: "The Lifelong Joy of Learning"
- Established: 1928
- School district: Chappaqua Central School District
- Superintendent: Christine Ackerman
- School code: 331315 (ACT/SAT/AP)
- Principal: Sandra Sepe
- Faculty: 105.87 (on an FTE basis)
- Grades: 9–12
- Enrollment: 1,122 (2024–25)
- Student to teacher ratio: 10.60
- Language: English
- Hours in school day: 6 hrs, 50 minutes
- Colors: Blue and orange
- Athletics conference: Section 1 (NYSPHSAA)
- Mascot: Quaker
- Team name: Quakers
- Newspaper: The Greeley Voice
- Communities served: New Castle, New York (part)
- Website: greeley.chappaquaschools.org
- (1) Originally located on the site of Robert E. Bell Middle School, serving grades 1–12. The school was relocated to its present site, in its current configuration, in 1957.

Horace Greeley High School is a public, four-year secondary school serving students in grades 9–12 in Chappaqua, New York, United States. It is part of the Chappaqua Central School District.

== Distinctions ==
Greeley was ranked No. 46 nationally in the 2008 U.S. News & World Report rankings of "America's Best High Schools," and No. 7 among those with open enrollment. It currently offers 21 advanced placement courses.

Recent years have seen approximately one-tenth of graduating seniors recognized by the National Merit Scholarship committee. The class of 2004 included 25 National Merit semi-finalists, the class of 2005 had 16, and the class of 2007 had 22. The mean SAT and ACT scores among graduating seniors for the Class of 2022 were 1368 and 29, respectively.

The school offers several extracurricular programs. Its academic challenge team won the National Academic Championship in 2003, 2013, and 2023 and finished third in 2009 and 2010. Chip Beall, the organizer of the tournament, noted in 2007 that Greeley's team had "the most airline miles logged at the National Academic Association's expense", a nod to their placement in the final rounds of the tournament more times than any other team in the tournament's history.

The Horace Greeley Debate Team has sent debaters to the state competition every year since its inception in 2002.

The Madrigal Choir, a select group of students auditioned from the full chorus, has attended the Disney Honors festival in Orlando, Florida and has performed with other choirs at such venues as Carnegie Hall and Lincoln Center. In 2011, the Madrigal Choir received a gold award and came in second place at the Boston Heritage Festival.

Programs at Horace Greeley include the LIFE (Learning Independently From Experience) school, an alternative school for grades 11–12 located on campus, independent study, and senior project options. Language classes are offered in four foreign languages: Spanish, French, Latin, and Chinese. In the 2004–2005 school year, Ancient Greek was taught for the first time, as an independent study. Students have the opportunity to take Syracuse University Project Advance (SUPA) Forensic Science. Students may take Business Law for college credit from Mercy College.

== Administration ==
The principal is Sandra Sepe, and there are four assistant principals.

== History ==
The school is named for Horace Greeley, the editor of The New York Tribune who made his home in Chappaqua late in life. The school's main publication is The Greeley Voice.

== Athletics ==
Among the diverse offerings are varsity programs in baseball, basketball, bowling, field hockey, football, golf, ice hockey, lacrosse, skiing, soccer, softball, swimming and diving, tennis, track and field, cross country, volleyball, and wrestling.

The school's most successful sports team historically has been their boys' swim team. More recently, the boys' swim team has achieved even greater success, winning the NYSPHSAA New York State Swimming Championship for three years in a row from 2022-2024. Their success is due to the training of the year round swimmers on club teams in the area. The school's first state championship came in 2002 and was won by the boys' cross country team. In 2001 the school's football team finished with a record of 11–2, losing 22–15 to Rochester's Aquinas Institute in the New York State Class A State Championship game.

Greeley's boys' indoor track and field team won leagues, counties, and sectionals three years in a row, 2022, 2023, and 2024.

== Campus ==
The school campus is made up of 11 buildings, all are named by letter. Buildings such as the Gym (A Building), Cafeteria (H Building), and Auditorium (B Building) are referred to as such and not by their letter name. Although the building letters span A through L, there is no I Building, for unknown reasons. Multiple athletic fields and a tennis court are also on campus. Horace Greeley High School originally opened in 1928 as part of the K-12 Horace Greeley School, which was located on the present-day site of Robert E. Bell Middle School. The high school's current campus opened in 1957.

=== L Building ===
L Building (L) is located towards the back of the high school, connected via a bridge to J building. Social Studies, Foreign Language, and English classes are all taught in L. There are 4 department offices located in L. L is split into two levels, called Upper L and Lower L. Prior to spring and summer 2020, L had normal size classrooms. When all Horace Greeley faculty and students were virtual in spring 2020, L was renovated to have open space and open classrooms. There are now "breakout rooms" and multiple common areas for students. The new classrooms were smaller and some had no doors, they are open to the hallway. The renovation of L coincided with the policy change that teachers would no longer have their own classroom. Instead, the teachers would be based in their respective department office.

=== Lowest L (The Bunker) ===
Lowest L, as dubbed by the school's teachers, is located below L Building. The school's servers are located there as well as storage and a loading dock. It is connected to the interior of lower L through only one door and connected to the outside through one door and two garage doors. Lowest L is effectively a bunker.

== Notable alumni ==
- William Ackman (1984), hedge fund investor (Pershing Square Capital Management)
- Dwight W. Anderson (1985), investor (Ospraie Management, LLC)
- Adam Arkin (c. 1975), actor
- Adam Mosseri (c. 2001), CEO of Instagram
- Dave Arnold (1989), author, mixology innovator, founder of the Museum of Food and Drink
- Stacey Bendet (1995), founder and CEO of Alice + Olivia
- Joe Berlinger (1979), director of the film Metallica: Some Kind of Monster (2004)
- Robert Berlinger (1976), director
- Bibi Besch, (1959), TV actress seen in multiple Star Trek, Jeff Foxworthy Show, and Falcon Crest episodes
- Dan Bucatinsky, (1983), author, producer, and Emmy-winning actor
- Knox Burger (1939), editor
- Steve Cohen, (1989), magician and author
- Richie Erenberg (1980), former football player, Pittsburgh Steelers 1984–87
- Ralph J. Gleason, music critic and columnist
- Roxanne Hart (1969), actress in film and television and on stage, with recurring roles in Dream On, Oz, and Chicago Hope (On the latter series, she played the wife of fellow alumnus Adam Arkin.)
- Jason Scott (1988), Archivist and Historian, Free-Range Archivist at the Internet Archive.
- Susan Hockfield (1969), former president (2004–2012) of the Massachusetts Institute of Technology (MIT)
- Heather Paige Kent (1986), actress, star of That's Life (2000) and The Real Housewives of Orange County (2012–present)
- John Kifner (1959), Williams College, New York Times journalist. Wrote lead piece on Kent State Massacre, among many others.
- Steve Kroft (1963), journalist and correspondent on the TV program 60 Minutes
- James Kwak (1986), blogger and University of Connecticut law professor
- Richard McKelvey (1961), political scientist
- Jordan Mechner (1981), game designer, creator of Karateka, Last Express, and the Prince of Persia series
- Jared Moshe, filmmaker
- Jacqueline Novak, comedian
- Dan O'Keefe (1986), TV writer for Seinfeld, famous for introducing Festivus
- Laurence O'Keefe (1987), composer who co-wrote the Tony Award-nominated music and lyrics for Legally Blonde: The Musical
- Mark O'Keefe (1989), screenwriter, including Bruce Almighty (2003) and Click (2006)
- Andy Rubin (1981), technology pioneer (hand-held devices), inventor of Android operating system
- Margo Schlanger (1985), former government official and University of Michigan law professor
- Eric Stangel (1989), a head writer and producer of Late Show with David Letterman
- Justin Stangel (1987), a head writer and producer of Late Show with David Letterman
- Kevin Wade (1972), screenwriter
- Chris Williams (1985), actor
- Dar Williams (1985), folk-pop singer-songwriter
- Vanessa L. Williams (1981), model, actress and singer
