= UNC Kenan–Flagler Business School =

Business school at UNC-Chapel Hill

Coordinates: 35.8998°N 79.0457°W

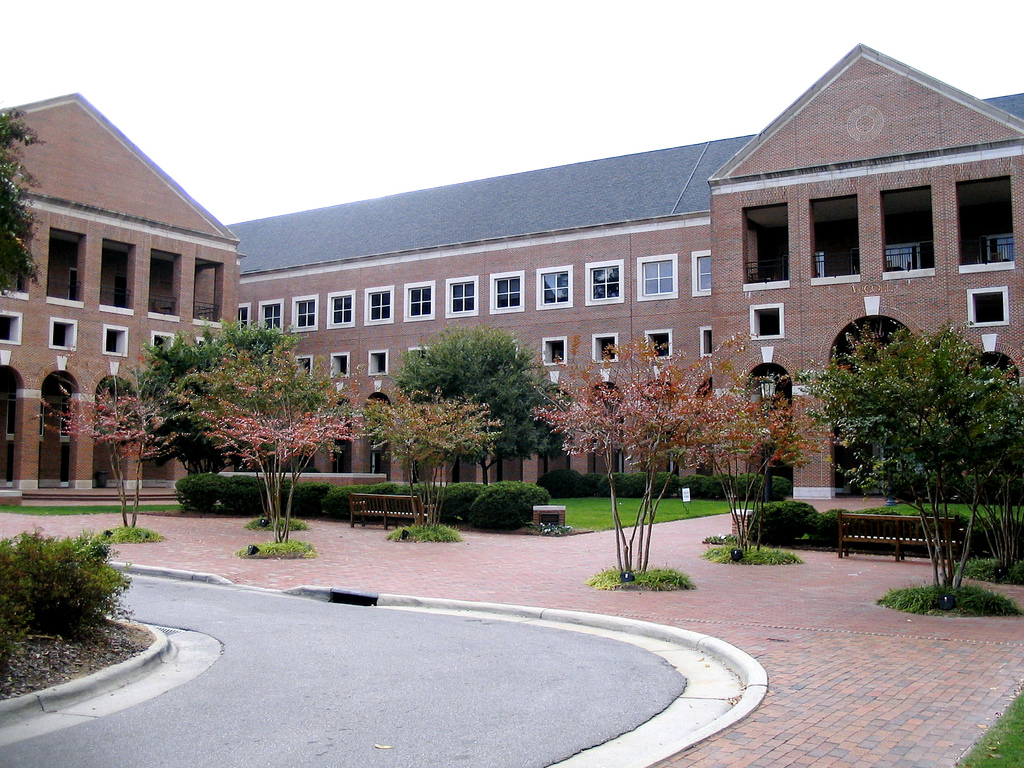
- Former names: UNC Department of Commerce (1919–1950); UNC Graduate School of Business Administration (1950–1991)
- Type: Public business school
- Established: 1919
- Parent institution: University of North Carolina at Chapel Hill
- Accreditation: AACSB
- Dean: Mary Margaret Frank
- Location: Chapel Hill, North Carolina, United States
- Website: kenan-flagler.unc.edu

The UNC Kenan–Flagler Business School is the business school of the University of North Carolina at Chapel Hill, a public university in Chapel Hill, North Carolina. Founded in 1919, the school was renamed to its current name in 1991 in honor of Mary Lily Kenan and her husband, Henry Flagler.

The school offers programs for granting a bachelor of science in business administration, a master of business administration, a master of science in management, an executive MBA, a master of accounting, a doctor of philosophy, a business certificate, and executive education programs. It is accredited by the Association to Advance Collegiate Schools of Business.

== History ==
The school was established in 1919 as the Department of Commerce of the College of Arts of the University of North Carolina at Chapel Hill.

In 1991, Frank Kenan continued his family’s legacy of supporting UNC by giving $10 million toward a new Business School building. The university changed its business school's name to Kenan–Flagler Business School in honor of Mary Lily Kenan and her husband, Henry Morrison Flagler.

On June 13, 2023, Chancellor Kevin M. Guskiewicz appointed Mary Margaret Frank as the dean of the UNC Kenan–Flagler Business School, effective August 15, 2023.

== Rankings ==
Business school rankings

U.S. MBA Rankings
- Bloomberg (2025): 20
- U.S. News & World Report (2026): 21

Global MBA Rankings
- FT (2026): 38

MBA Full-time Program Rankings (additional to chart)

- U.S. News & World Report - 2026
  - 8th (tie) in undergraduate business
  - 21st in full-time MBA programs
- Poets&Quants - 2026
  - 21st in full-time MBA programs
- Beyond Grey Pinstripes (Aspen Institute) - 2012
  - 7th in the United States
- Princeton Review and Entrepreneur - 2015
  - 11th for graduate programs in entrepreneurship

Executive MBA

- The Wall Street Journal ranked the Weekend Program: 10th in 2010
- Bloomberg BusinessWeek for the Weekend Program: 11th in 2004
- Financial Times ranked OneMBA: 29th in 2016

Online MBA

- The U.S. News & World Report ranked the Online MBA 3rd in 2026

MAC Program (Master of Accounting)

- Public of Accounting Report: 7th in 2009

Executive Development (Non-Degree Programs)

- Financial Times: 9th for custom programs
- Bloomberg BusinessWeek: 14th for executive education

== People ==
=== Faculty ===
- Robert S. Adler, Consumer Advocate
- Howard Aldrich, Sociologist
- Paolo Fulghieri, Financial Economist
- Rajdeep Grewal
- James H. Johnson Jr.
- Arne L. Kalleberg, Sociologist
- Jan-Benedict Steenkamp, expert on global marketing
- Valarie Zeithaml, Services marketing pioneer; developer of SERVQUAL

=== Alumni ===
- Lee Ainslie, MBA, Founder and CEO of Maverick Capital (a $10B long/short hedge fund)
- John A. Allison IV, Chairman and Former CEO of BB&T (BSBA at UNC Kenan–Flagler) and current Director of Moelis & Company
- Erskine Bowles (BSBA '67), former president, University of North Carolina System; former White House Chief of Staff; former head of Small Business Administration; former United Nations deputy envoy for tsunami relief
- Michele Buck, MBA '87, CEO of The Hershey Company
- Hubert C. Hegtvedt, U.S. Air Force Major General
- Jason Kilar, Co-founder and former CEO, Hulu
- Hugh McColl Jr. (BSBA '57), Former Chairman and CEO, Bank of America Corporation
- Gary Parr (BSBA '79), Deputy Chairman, Lazard Frères & Co.
- Mercer Reynolds: Businessman, finance chair of George W. Bush's Presidential campaign.
- Julian Robertson (BSBA '55), Chairman, Tiger Management
- David N. Senty, U.S. Air Force Major General
- G. Smedes York, MBA 1968, 33rd Mayor of Raleigh 1979-1983, Chairman of York Properties, Inc.

== See also ==
- List of United States business school rankings
- List of business schools in the United States
