= Andreas Halvorsen =

Andreas Halvorsen may refer to:

- Ole Andreas Halvorsen, Norwegian-American billionaire hedge fund manager
- Andreas Halvorsen (golfer), Norwegian golfer
- Andreas Fjeld Halvorsen, Norwegian runner
