= Maverick Capital =

American hedge fund company

- Type: Private company
- Industry: Investment management
- Founded: 1993; 33 years ago
- Founder: Lee Ainslie
- Headquarters: Dallas, Texas, United States
- Products: Hedge funds, investments
- AUM: US$15.8 billion (2025)
- Website: maverickcapital.com

Maverick Capital is an American hedge fund firm. It was founded by Lee Ainslie in 1993, who was a "Tiger Cub" under Julian Robertson at Tiger Management.

It primarily invests in shares (avoiding bonds, commodities, currencies, and options), holding both long and short positions and buying what it thinks will beat the market. It employs fundamental analysis and examines management closely. It examines companies for "good capital-allocation decisions", and especially how incremental returns on invested capital compare to the cost of capital.

== History ==
Maverick Capital was founded by Lee Ainslie in 1993, who was a "Tiger Cub" under Julian Robertson at Tiger Management, helped raise $38 million in capital by the family of Texas entrepreneur Sam Wyly. From 1995 to 2014, the fund returned a compounded return of 13% annually.

The firm started to diversify into young companies in 2004 under its flagship equities hedge fund (under David Singer). In 2006, Lee Ainslie described Maverick Capital as a traditional fund that puts greater premium on the value of its relationships with management teams than more "interventionist" hedge funds.

In October 2014, Maverick announced that it would begin investing in startups by launching its first venture capital fund on January 1, 2015. Many of its investments involve healthcare and biotechnology. By the end of 2015, the firm carried over $6.9 billion in holdings.

In May 2025, it was reported the company invested in artificial intelligence hardware start-up called 'io', founded in 2024 by Jony Ive, and then acquired by OpenAI for $6.5 billion, subject to regulatory approval.
