= Ospraie Management =

Ospraie Management, LLC
- Type: Investment Manager
- Industry: Hedge fund
- Founded: 2004; 22 years ago
- Founder: Dwight Anderson; Jason Mraz
- Headquarters: 437 Madison Avenue, 28th Floor; New York, New York, United States
- Website: www.ospraie.com

Ospraie Management, LLC is a New York City-based investment management firm that invests in commodities and basic industries worldwide across public and private markets. The company, through its venture arm, makes agriculture-focused investments that seek to reduce environmental impact.

== History ==
Ospraie was launched by Dwight Anderson and Jason Mraz as an independent commodities hedge fund within Tudor Investment Corporation. Ospraie became an independent firm in 2004, launching with $1.2 billion in assets under management. At its peak in 2008, the firm managed assets totaling nearly $9 billion. In 2005, Lehman Brothers Holdings Inc. purchased a 20 percent stake in Ospraie for an undisclosed amount which it bought back in 2009, leaving Ospraie employee-owned.

In 2006, Ospraie launched the Ospraie Special Opportunities Fund, which holds private-equity stakes in commodities and basic industries companies. The fund was the lead investor in the 2008 acquisition of Gavilon LLC.

As of 2007, Ospraie offered five investment products: the flagship Ospraie Fund, Ospraie Special Opportunities, Wingspan Fund (a fund of funds), Real Return Fund (a long-only fund), and the Point Fund (a concentrated commodity fund).

In 2008, Ospraie closed its flagship fund after losing 38.6% for the year amidst falling commodity prices and significant losses in energy, mining and resource equity holdings. It was reported to be one of the biggest closures of a commodities-focused hedge fund.

In 2009, Ospraie launched two new hedge funds: the Ospraie Commodity Fund, which focuses on commodity futures and derivatives, and the Ospraie Equity Fund, which invests in listed commodities companies.

In 2018, Ospraie-backed Pandion Mine Finance, LP closed its inaugural fund at $175 million. Pandion is a mining-focused investment firm backed by Ospraie and MKS PAMP Group that provides flexible financing solutions to developing mining companies.

In 2018, Ospraie launched its agriculture focused venture arm, Ospraie Ag Science.

== Gavilon Acquisition ==
In 2008, the Ospraie Special Opportunities Fund led an investor group in the $2.8 billion acquisition of ConAgra Foods’s commodity trading and merchandising operations. The investor group also included General Atlantic and Soros Fund Management. The acquired ConAgra business was renamed Gavilon upon closing of the transaction in June 2008.

In July 2013, Marubeni purchased Gavilon for $2.7 billion, plus $2 billion in debt. Upon the announcement of the deal, the media reported that investors would have had made a nearly 100% return on their investment.

== Concord Resources Limited ==
In 2015, Ospraie provided financial backing for the launch of Concord Resources Limited, a global commodities trading company, focused on non-ferrous metals and minerals such as copper, zinc, aluminum, nickel and lead. Concord is led by Mark Hansen, who previously served as the global head of metals at Noble Group. Ospraie is one of the company’s founding shareholders, and Dwight Anderson serves as chairman of its board.

== Ospraie Ag Science ==
In 2018, Ospraie launched its agriculture-focused venture arm, Ospraie Ag Science. Ospraie Ag Science follows a three-pronged investment strategy focused on sustainable crop inputs, controlled environment agriculture and soil diagnostics. As of March 2021, Ospraie Ag Science manages $137.9 million focused largely on early-stage companies with some scope for backing “mature high-growth companies."

Ospraie Ag Science's investments have spanned companies at a variety of stages and sizes, both public and private. For early stage investments, this has included a $3 million seed funding round for Argentinian startup BeeFlow and a $1.2 million seed financing round and $4 million Series A funding round for California-based Agragene. Ospraie Ag Science was also a participant in a $45 million Series B funding round for Canadian developer Terramera and, in 2018, they completed a $75 million recapitalization of NASDAQ-listed biological inputs company Marrone Bio Innovations.

In January 2021, Ospraie Ag Science acquired a majority stake in ethanol plant process technology developer Fluid Quip Technologies LLC in a joint transaction with Green Plains Inc., a leading biorefining company.

== Founder ==
Dwight Anderson launched Ospraie with Jason Mraz in partnership with Tudor Investment Corporation, where Anderson served as Head of the Basic Industries Group, before establishing Ospraie Management, LLC as an independent firm in 2004. Prior to joining Tudor, Anderson was a managing director responsible for the Basic Industries and Commodities Group at Tiger Management. Recruited and mentored by Julian Robertson, Anderson is known as a “Tiger Cub,” a name given to alumni of Tiger Management who have since started their own funds.
