= Dwight Anderson =

Dwight Anderson may refer to:

- Dwight Anderson (basketball) (1960–2020), American basketball player
- Dwight Anderson (gridiron football) (born 1981), Canadian football defensive back
- Dwight W. Anderson, American hedge fund manager
