= Touradji =

Surname

Touradji is a surname, and may refer to:

- Paul Touradji, hedge fund founder (Catequil Asset Management, Touradji Capital Management)
- Pegah Touradji, Assistant Professor at Johns Hopkins Medicine
