= David N. Senty =

United States Air Force general

- Military career
- Allegiance: United States
- Branch: Air Force
- Service years: 1975-2011
- Rank: Major General
- Conflicts: Gulf War; War in Afghanistan; Iraq War
- Awards: Air Force Distinguished Service Medal; Legion of Merit with oak leaf cluster Bronze Star Medal

David N. Senty is a retired major general in the United States Air Force.

== Biography ==
Senty is a native of Sheboygan, Wisconsin. He has attended Drake University, the University of Northern Colorado, the University of Georgia, the John F. Kennedy School of Government at Harvard University, the Kellogg School of Management at Northwestern University and the Kenan-Flagler Business School at the University of North Carolina at Chapel Hill.

== Career ==
Senty was commissioned an officer in the Air Force in 1975. He was then assigned to the 94th Tactical Airlift Wing and later attended the Squadron Officer School. In 1979, he became a wing intelligence officer at Tactical Air Command. Also that year, he began working with the Central Intelligence Agency. In 1982, he attended the Air Command and Staff College.

In 1983, Senty was assigned to the Defense Intelligence Agency. He was then stationed at the National Reconnaissance Office and later attended the Air War College. Senty also deployed to serve in the Gulf War. In 1993, he became an intelligence director of the Office of the United States Secretary of Defense at The Pentagon. He attended the Foreign Service Institute in 1995.

Senty was stationed at Wright-Patterson Air Force Base from 1996 until 1998, when he became a mobilization assistant to the Commander of the Air Intelligence Agency. In 2001, he returned to The Pentagon in the Office of the Deputy Chief of Staff for Air and Space Operations. He would also serve in the War in Afghanistan (2001–present) and the Iraq War.

In 2008, he served as a mobilization assistant to the Director of the National Security Agency and the Chief of the Central Security Service. Later that year, he became a mobilization assistant to the Commander of Air Force Cyber Command (Provisional). The following year, he was briefly a mobilization assistant to the Commander of the Twenty-Fourth Air Force before becoming Chief of Staff of United States Cyber Command. Senty retired in 2011.

== Awards and decorations ==
Awards he received during his career include the Air Force Distinguished Service Medal, the Defense Superior Service Medal, the Legion of Merit with oak leaf cluster, the Bronze Star Medal, the Meritorious Service Medal, the Joint Service Commendation Medal, the Air Force Commendation Medal, the Air Force Achievement Medal, the Organizational Excellence Award with three oak leaf clusters, the Air Force Recognition Ribbon, the National Defense Service Medal with service star, the Southwest Asia Service Medal with service star, the Afghanistan Campaign Medal with service star, the Iraq Campaign Medal with service star, the Global War on Terrorism Expeditionary Medal, the Global War on Terrorism Service Medal, the Air Force Expeditionary Service Ribbon with gold frame, the Armed Forces Reserve Medal with Mobilization Device, the Kuwait Liberation Medal (Saudi Arabia) and the Kuwait Liberation Medal (Kuwait).

1st Row	Air Force Distinguished Service Medal	Defense Superior Service Medal	Legion of Merit with oak leaf cluster	Bronze Star Medal
2nd Row	Meritorious Service Medal	Joint Service Commendation Medal	Air Force Commendation Medal	Air Force Achievement Medal
3rd Row	Organizational Excellence Award with three oak leaf clusters	Air Force Recognition Ribbon	National Defense Service Medal with service star	Southwest Asia Service Medal with service star
4th Row	Afghanistan Campaign Medal with service star	Iraq Campaign Medal with service star	Global War on Terrorism Expeditionary Medal	Global War on Terrorism Service Medal
5th Row	Air Force Expeditionary Service Ribbon with gold frame	Armed Forces Reserve Medal with Mobilization Device	Kuwait Liberation Medal (Saudi Arabia)	Kuwait Liberation Medal (Kuwait)
