= Paolo Fulghieri =

American economist

Paolo Fulghieri is an American economist, currently the Macon G. Patton Distinguished Professor of Finance at UNC Kenan–Flagler Business School, University of North Carolina at Chapel Hill.

He received his PhD and MA in economics from the University of Pennsylvania, and his Laurea in economics from the Universita' Commerciale L. Bocconi in Milan.
