= Touradji Capital Management =

Touradji Capital Management is a hedge fund based in New York City.

It was founded by Paul Touradji in January 2005 after his previous venture, Catequil Asset Management, was closed amid a legal dispute.

Touradji Capital is called a "Tiger Cub", as it is a fund that grew out of Julian Robertson's Tiger Management.

In 2007, the fund had $0.5 billion under management.

In January–July 2012, Peter Borish was CEO of Touradji Capital Management.

In May 2019, a Manhattan jury unanimously found Touradji Capital Management LP responsible for the compensation of two former portfolio managers, Gentry Beach and Robert Vollero. The verdict awarded the former employees over $40m and with statutory interest the judgment was entered in an amount in excess of $90m. According to the New York Law Journal, Seiden Law LLP in New York, with attorneys Robert Seiden, Michael Stolper and David Greenberger handled the litigation against Touradji Capital Management LP and will be handling the appeal.
