= Chappaqua Central School District =

School district in the U.S. state of New York

Address
- 66 Roaring Brook Road Chappaqua, New York, 10514; United States

District information
- Type: Public
- Grades: K–12
- Established: 1928; 98 years ago
- Superintendent: Christine Ackerman
- Budget: $133,963,411(2022 - 2023)
- NCES District ID: 3606990

Students and staff
- Enrollment: 3,563 (2019–2020)
- Teachers: 328.65
- Student–teacher ratio: 10.84

Other information
- Website: www.chappaquaschools.org

The Chappaqua Central School District is a K-12 public school district in Westchester County, New York.

It includes the village of Chappaqua, New York and the census-designated place of Millwood. The district covers much of New Castle and portions of Mount Pleasant.

The current superintendent of schools is Christine Ackerman. Chappaqua Central School District is ranked 53rd Best School District in the United States by Niche.

== Schools and Administrators ==
=== Superintendent and Cabinet Positions ===
Position	Name
Superintendent of Schools	Christine Ackerman
Assistant Superintendent for Curriculum and Instruction	Adam Pease
Assistant Superintendent for Human Resources and Leadership Development	Andrew Corsilia
Assistant Superintendent for Pupil Personnel Services	Jasmin Helou-Caré
Assistant Superintendent for Business	Joshua Culwell-Block

=== Board of education ===
July 1, 2026 to June 30, 2027

- Alissa Dorfman, President
- Allison Steinbauer, Vice President
- Matt Auerbach
- Cailee Hwang
- Tim McNamara

=== Schools ===
==== High school ====
- Horace Greeley High School, Sandra Sepe, principal

==== Middle schools ====
- Robert E. Bell Middle School, Geoff Curtis, principal

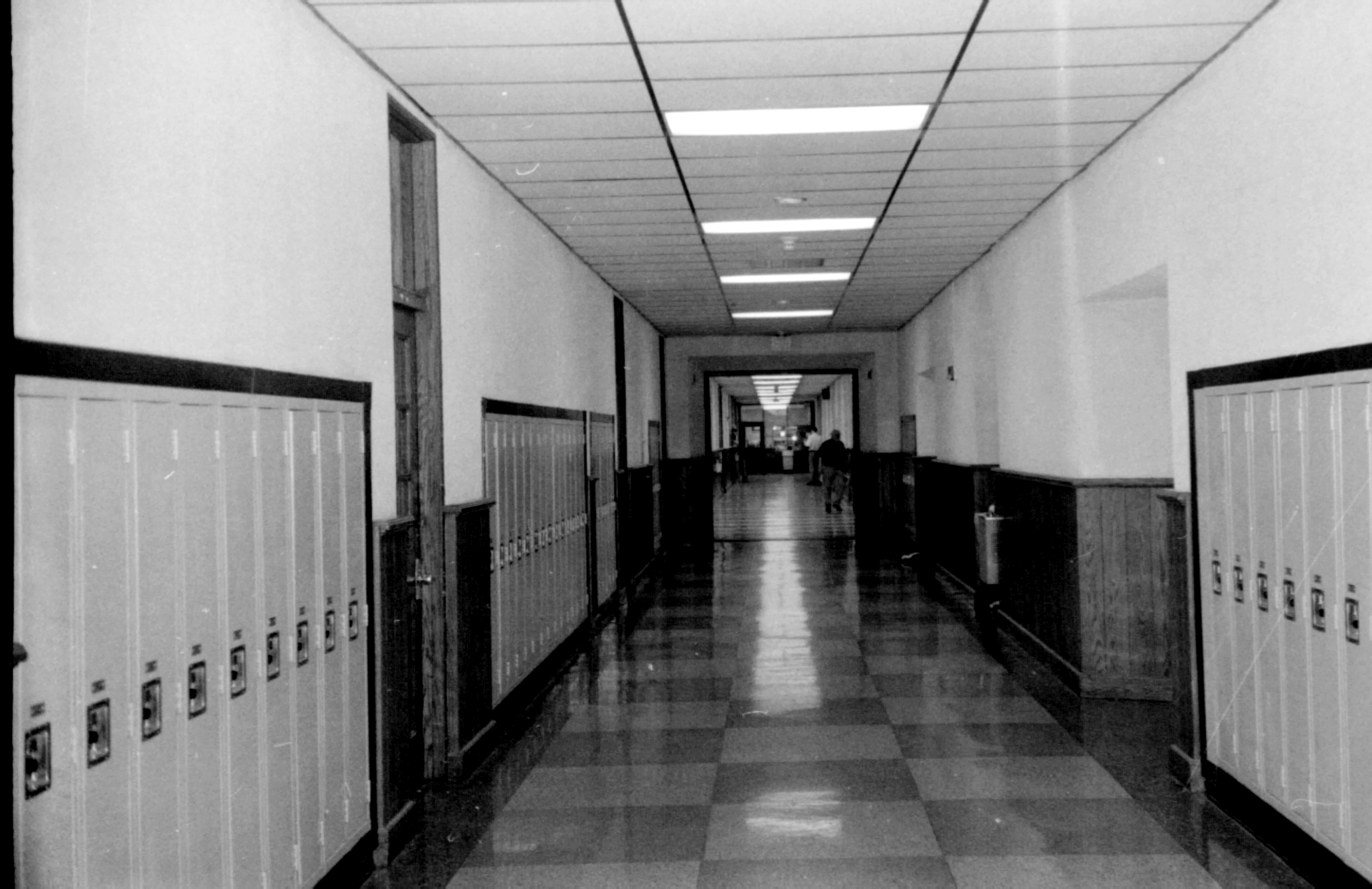
Corridor in Robert E. Bell school, 1990s

- Seven Bridges Middle School: Dr. Lyn Stewart, principal

==== Elementary schools ====
- Douglas G. Grafflin Elementary School, Debbie Alspach, principal
- Roaring Brook Elementary School, Tonya Wilson, principal
- Westorchard Elementary School, Alissa Stoever, principal

== Former Schools ==
- King Street School (1800s-1930, 1931-1951)
- Rural District Schools, Numbers 1-12 (closed 1928)

All of these schools with the exception of the King Street School operated from 1931-1951 were one-room schoolhouses that were merged into Rural School District Number 4, which became known as Chappaqua Central School District Number 4, and then the Chappaqua Central School District.

== Real Estate ==
According to The New York Times, homes in the district had a mean sale price of $966,000 in 2014; which was a significant increase from $892,000 in 2013 and $844,000 in 2010. Homes mostly vary from $525,000-$25,000,000 and the district's mean sale price was at its highest in 2007 at $1,278,000—just before the housing market crashed. The lowest recorded mean sale price was in 2008 at $822,000.

== History ==
Before the school district was officially chartered, one-room schoolhouses devoid of windows were prevalent. The school districts began merging into what was then known as Rural School District No. 4 of the Towns of New Castle & Mount Pleasant which became the Chappaqua Central School District. The Chappaqua Central School District, pursuant to Education Law, merged to what was then known as Chappaqua School District No. 4 completely by 1927. In need of larger facilities, construction on Horace Greeley School, named for Horace Greeley, a prominent statesman and news publisher that lived in town, began that same year. The building was designed and built by John Borup, as indicated on a plaque outside the entrance by the Auditorium. Construction finished in 1928, and the school opened that September as a grade 1-12 school. In 1937, the Public Works Administration completed an addition including a new gymnasium, and designed by the firm of Tooker & Marsh and built by Wintour J. Hackett & Co. The district principal at the time was Robert E. Bell, for whom Bell Middle School is now named. Douglas G. Grafflin, for whom the Grafflin School was named, was Bell's successor as district principal.

In 1951, Roaring Brook Elementary School, which at the time was a one-room schoolhouse, was enlarged into its current building in 1951 and became part of the school district. In 1957, Horace Greeley School moved to its current location at 70 Roaring Brook Road, now as Horace Greeley High School, with the district headquarters moved next door to 66 Roaring Brook Road. The former Horace Greeley School was enlarged and turned into Robert E. Bell Middle School. In 1962, Douglas G. Grafflin Elementary School was finished, and opened its doors that September. In 1971, Westorchard Elementary School was built and opened on a parcel near West Orchard Road. This ended the Chappaqua Central School District's expansion for 32 years.

For a period in the late 1950s, kindergarten and fifth grade classes for the district were housed in J Building at Horace Greeley High School due to overcrowding, which prompted an addition at Roaring Brook and the construction of Douglas Grafflin Elementary School in 1962. For a brief period in the 1970s, there was no room at Roaring Brook Elementary School for kindergarten or fifth grade classes. This was partially alleviated with the construction of Westorchard Elementary School in 1971. In 1974, an addition was hastily erected at Westorchard. In 1973, the district rented the St. John & St. Mary Parish School, which had closed a year earlier, and the building housed fifth grade classes. J Building at Greeley also housed classes. In 1975, "temporary" portable trailers were erected at Roaring Brook Elementary School which housed Roaring Brook's kindergarten classes until 2002.

In 2001, ground was broken on Seven Bridges Middle School, which was built in order to alleviate overcrowding at the town's only middle school, Robert E. Bell Middle School.

In 2002, to address overcrowding, an addition of a new wing for the kindergarten classes was added to Roaring Brook, and the rapidly decaying portables were demolished. In June 2003, Seven Bridges was finished, dedicated in August, and opened its doors to its first students that September. Fifth grade students were then moved to the middle school to help overcrowding at the district's three elementary schools.

== Controversy ==
In 2015, Horace Greeley High School drama teacher Christopher Schraufnagel resigned and was charged with the sexual abuse and child endangerment of three 15-year-old students. All crimes were alleged to have occurred between 2011 and 2015 on campus. The parents of several students (some not involved in the criminal case) subsequently filed a lawsuit against the school district. In 2016, Superintendent Lyn Mckay resigned amid growing public pressure due to the handling of this event. On December 30, 2022, Schraufnagel died of cancer.

In January 2025, nonprofit literary freedom advocacy organization PEN America signed an open letter demanding that the district place the children's book Young Palestinians Speak: Life Under Occupation by Anthony Robinson and Annemarie Young, a collection of testimony from Palestinian youth about life in the West Bank and Gaza back into a district middle school's library that it was removed from in April 2024. The call was joined by the book's authors and other published writers including Maia Kobabe, Ellen Hopkins and Kelly Jensen. Following a complaint from a district parent, the book was barred from access to students and subsequently moved to Horace Greeley High School following a complaint from a member of the district community, which PEN America referred to as a "ban by restriction" in an October 2024 letter to school administrators, in which PEN America expressed concern for the restriction of the diversity in perspectives and viewpoints available to students. According to district superintendent Christine Ackerman, the reason for the book's relocation was the intent of its authors and required historical context, "which middle school students are less likely to have compared to high school students."
