= Archegos Capital Management =

American family office

Archegos Capital
- Type: Private
- Industry: Investment management
- Founded: 2013
- Founder: Bill Hwang
- Defunct: March 26, 2021; 5 years ago
- Fate: Defaulted on margin calls
- Headquarters: New York City, New York

Archegos Capital Management was a limited partnership family office that managed the personal assets of Bill Hwang, at one time managing over $36 billion in assets. In November 2024, Hwang was sentenced to 18 years in prison on federal charges of fraud and racketeering.

On March 26, 2021, Archegos defaulted on margin calls from several global investment banks, including Credit Suisse and Nomura Holdings, as well as Goldman Sachs and Morgan Stanley. The firm had large, concentrated positions in ViacomCBS, Baidu, Vipshop, Farfetch, and other companies, and the firm's use of total return swaps had helped to hide its high exposure from lending banks. Its derivative contracts "exposed the firm to severe losses when the trades went bad." The Wall Street Journal reported that Hwang lost $8 billion in 10 days, while Bloomberg News reported that Hwang lost $20 billion in 2 days. The fate of Archegos has been compared to the meltdown caused by Long Term Capital Management.

== History ==
Formerly of Tiger Cub fund Tiger Asia Management, Hwang created the Archegos family office in 2013, with $10 billion under management as of 2020. Its name is Greek for "leader." Tiger Asia Management had previously pleaded guilty to insider trading of Chinese bank stocks in 2012 and paid a $44 million fine. In 2014, Hwang "was banned from trading in Hong Kong for four years."

Archegos' holdings were primarily in the form of total return swaps, a financial instrument where the underlying securities (stocks) are held by banks. This meant that Archegos did not need to disclose its large holdings, while if it had transacted in regular stocks it would have had to. The fund was also heavily leveraged and did business with multiple banks which were likely unaware of Archegos' large positions held by other banks.

=== March 2021 losses ===
Losses by bank
Company	Loss (US$ mln)
Credit Suisse	5,500
Nomura	2,850
Morgan Stanley	911
UBS	774
Mitsubishi UFJ Financial	300

On March 26, 2021, banks offering prime brokerage services to Archegos started to liquidate billions of dollars' worth of various stocks after it had failed to meet a margin call. The stocks were reportedly tied to the total return swaps held by Archegos. This sale was reported to be the cause of a 27% plunge in share price of ViacomCBS and a similar fall in the price of Discovery, Inc.

On March 29, the share price of Credit Suisse was down by 14%, while Nomura Holdings shares declined by 16%. A press release from Credit Suisse said that "the loss resulting from this exit ... could be highly significant and material to our first quarter results." According to The Wall Street Journal, Goldman Sachs and Morgan Stanley were able to limit their losses relating to Archegos by acting more quickly than Credit Suisse and Nomura Holdings. Other banks, such as Deutsche Bank, were able to close their substantial positions quickly and avoid any losses.

On March 30, Mitsubishi UFJ Financial Group (MUFG) securities arm declared a $300 million loss in its EMEA operations linked to Archegos. Baidu was added to the list of affected stocks. Also on March 30, the Securities and Exchange Commission stated it was conducting an investigation into the matter.

The demise of Archegos helped drag the Nikkei 225 Index down by 0.77% on March 30, 2021, triggering a worldwide sell-off in banking stocks.

On April 5, 2021, the Chair of the US Senate banking committee, Sherrod Brown, wrote to Crystal Lalime, general counsel at Credit Suisse, as well as Nomura, Goldman Sachs and Morgan Stanley to inquire about "the implosion of Archegos Capital" and gave the lenders 14 days to reply. Credit Suisse was mentioned by the Financial Times as "allowing the family office (of Hwang) to make highly leveraged bets on US and Chinese stocks". The Securities Exchange Commission and the Financial Conduct Authority also have requested information about the implosion from the lenders, as well as the NGO Self-regulatory organization Finra.

On April 6, 2021, Credit Suisse reported losses of $4.7 billion linked to its involvement with Archegos. The bank's chief risk and compliance officer, and head of the investment bank were reported to have departed as a result of the losses caused by Archegos and Greensill crises. Later, the bank announced that it would have to raise up to $2 billion in fresh capital to support its equity base. Reported losses increased to $5.5 billion in late April on a notional exposure of over $20 billion, or more than half of the bank's capital at the time.

On April 16, 2021, Morgan Stanley reported a loss of nearly $1 billion related to the Archegos collapse, $644 million by selling stocks it held related to Archegos' positions, and another $267 million trying to "derisk" them. Credit Suisse Group AG and Japan's Nomura Holdings Inc took the main hit, with reported losses of $5.5 billion and $2 billion, respectively.

On April 27, 2021, UBS Group AG, Switzerland's biggest bank by assets, reported that it lost $774 million in connection with Archegos’ failure. Nomura, which initially reported the losses of around $2 billion the previous month, increased its total loss to $2.85 billion.

=== Legal actions ===
On April 27, 2022, Hwang and former Archegos CFO, Patrick Halligan, were arrested and charged with racketeering conspiracy, securities fraud, and wire fraud in connection the company's 2021 collapse. In a 59-page indictment, Manhattan federal prosecutors alleged that Hwang and Hallligan schemed to manipulate stock prices. Lawyers for Hwang and Halligan stated that they were innocent of the charges in the indictment. In July 2023, Credit Suisse (which had been acquired by UBS) was fined a sum of $387 million by US and British financial authorities for mismanagement related to Archegos.

== See Also ==
- Situational Awareness LP
- List of trading losses
