= Addition (investment firm) =

Venture Capital firm in New York

Addition L.P.
- Type: Private
- Industry: Investment management
- Founded: 2020
- Founder: Lee Fixel
- Headquarters: Park Avenue Tower, New York City, New York, U.S.
- AUM: US$7 billion (2022)
- Website: www.addition.com

Addition is an American venture capital firm based in New York City that invests in early and growth-stage technology companies.

== Background ==
In March 2019, Lee Fixel, who was the Head of Tiger Global Management's private equity business, announced that he would be leaving the firm after 13 years with it. Fixel had played a significant role in expanding its private investment arm with successful investments in companies including Facebook, Spotify and Uber. Sources have stated that Fixel was tired of the decision-making process at Tiger Global Management where multiple partners had to approve each deal and that he would be unlikely to run the firm as the other partners were only several years older than him.

In 2020, Fixel launched his firm named Addition. It is considered a Tiger Cub as it was spun out of one.

In June 2020, Addition raised $1.3 billion for its first fund, Addition One Partners. A few months later, Addition raised $1.4 billion for its second fund.

Fixel runs Addition as the sole partner at the top, and he will make the final decisions at the firm. It has a traditional management fee and carried interest structure. One-third of its capital will go to early-stage investments, while the rest will go towards growth-stage investments.

== Funds ==
Fund	Vintage Year	Committed Capital (US$m)
Addition One	2020	1,300
Addition Two	2020	1,400
Addition Three	2021	1,500
Addition Four	2022	1,500
Addition Five	2023	1,500

== Notable investments ==
- Chainalysis
- Delhivery
- dLocal
- Hugging Face
- Snyk
- Zap Energy
- Stripe
