= Chase Coleman III =

American hedge fund manager (born 1975)

- Born: Charles Payson Coleman III; June 1, 1975 (age 51)
- Education: Williams College
- Occupation: Hedge fund manager
- Title: Founder, Tiger Global Management
- Spouse: Stephanie Ercklentz (m. 2005)
- Children: 4

Charles Payson "Chase" Coleman III (born June 1, 1975) is an American billionaire hedge fund manager, and the founder of Tiger Global Management. As of May 2025, his net worth is estimated at more than US$6 billion by Forbes making him the 581st richest person in the world.

== Early life and education ==
Coleman grew up in Glen Head, Long Island. His father, C. Payson Coleman Jr., born in 1950, is a partner at the New York law firm Pillsbury Winthrop Shaw Pittman, and his mother, Kim Coleman, owns an interior design firm.

His grandfather, Charles Payson Coleman, who was managing partner of the New York law firm Davis Polk & Wardwell until his death in 1982, was married to Mimi C. Thompson (née Louise Stuyvesant Wainwright), a niece of Carroll Livingston Wainwright and a descendant of Peter Stuyvesant, the last Dutch Governor who surrendered New Amsterdam to the British.

Coleman followed his father to both Deerfield Academy and Williams College, where he graduated in 1997, and was co-captain of the lacrosse team.

== Investment career ==
Coleman started his career in 1997, working for Julian Robertson and the latter's hedge fund, Tiger Management. He had grown up with Robertson's son, Spencer, who lived close to Glen Head, in Locust Valley. In 2000, Robertson closed his fund, and entrusted Coleman with over $25 million to manage, making him one of the 30 or more so-called "Tiger Cubs", fund managers who started their fund management careers with Tiger Management. "I've known Chase since he was a young boy on Long Island and a good friend of my son Spencer," [Julian] Robertson said.

Coleman serves as partner of the investment firm he founded, Tiger Global Management. The hedge fund was an early investor in both Facebook and LinkedIn.

On the Forbes 2019 list of the world's billionaires, he was ranked #458 with a net worth of US$4.5 billion. According to Business Insider, he was born into "old money" and has made a lot of "new money" as well. According to Institutional Investor, he made an estimated $2.5 billion in 2020.

== Political contributions ==
In 2012 Coleman donated US$31,000 to the National Republican Senatorial Committee and US$5,000 to Mitt Romney's presidential campaign. He has also donated to Democratic candidates, including $10,000 to New York Governor Andrew Cuomo, $4,950 to Manhattan Borough President Scott Stringer, and $2,700 to New York Senator Charles Schumer.

== Personal life ==
Coleman married Stephanie Ercklentz, the daughter of lawyer Enno Ercklentz Jr. and Mai Harrison and step-daughter of Ridgely W. Harrison Jr., at Bethesda-by-the-Sea, Palm Beach, Florida, in 2005. She is a Wellesley College graduate who worked in investment banking for Merrill Lynch and Marketing and PR for Anne Klein and Vera Wang. Ercklentz was featured in the film Born Rich, a 2003 documentary about growing up in the world's richest families. Her mother, Mai Harrison (née Vilms), is the grand-niece of Jüri Vilms, a member of the Estonian Salvation Committee and leader of the Estonian Independence Movement.

The couple resides in New York City with their 4 children. In 2007, they bought an estate on Meadow Lane in Southampton for $32.5 million. In 2008, they bought the entire sixth floor of a Fifth Avenue building at 66th Street from Veronica Hearst, the daughter-in-law of William Randolph Hearst, for US$36.5 million. In 2016, the Colemans bought the fifth floor for $52 million and infamously allowed party guests to graffiti its walls in 2018 before demolishing its interior to combine it with their existing home. They also own properties in Palm Beach, Florida.
