= Texas Capital Bank =

Commercial bank

Texas Capital Bancshares, Inc.
- Type: Public
- Traded as: Nasdaq: TCBI; S&P 400 component
- Industry: Banking
- Founded: 1998; 28 years ago
- Headquarters: Dallas, Texas, U.S.
- Key people: Rob C. Holmes (president and CEO)
- Revenue: ▲US$1.26 billion (FY '25)
- Net income: ▲US$313.8 million (FY '25)
- Total assets: ▲US$31.5 billion (FYE '25)
- Number of employees: Approx. 2,200
- Website: texascapitalbank.com

Texas Capital Bank is a bank headquartered in Dallas, Texas. The bank has branches located in every major city in Texas. Its parent bank holding company is Texas Capital Bancshares. It also operates an online-only banking division, Bask Bank.

== History ==
The bank was established on December 18, 1998, by a group of entrepreneurial bankers who were able to raise $80 million in start-up capital, the most for a new financial institution at that time. In 2003, the company completed an IPO. The online-only subsidiary Bask Bank was launched in early 2020.

In 2020, a potential merger with Independent Bank Group of McKinney, Texas collapsed, causing the CEO to step down. In late 2021, the new CEO adopted a strategy of moving away from loan-oriented growth in the commercial banking sector, towards becoming a full-service financial institution over the following five years, and launched a new investment bank division.

On September 6, 2022, it was announced that Texas Capital Bancshares would sell BankDirect Capital Finance, a premium financing company founded in 2005, to Truist Financial for $3.4 billion. The sale was part of its strategic shift, allowing it to shed a non-core business while increasing its capital levels during the transition.

In March 2022, Texas Capital Bank was named by Newsweek Magazine as the most trustworthy bank in America, based on a survey of 50,000 U.S. residents. In October 2022, it expanded its lease at 2000 McKinney Avenue in Uptown Dallas for its headquarters, and the building was renamed Texas Capital Center. Texas Capital Bancshares received investments from several hedge funds in late 2022.

== Services ==
The bank primarily serves clients and operates full-service locations in Austin, Dallas, Fort Worth, Houston, and San Antonio metropolitan areas of Texas. It also has an executive office in New York. As of March 2023, the company held $28.4 billion in assets and had around 2,200 employees.

The bank offers many business deposit products and services, as well as other treasury management services and consumer deposit products. The company also provides commercial loans and financing for corporate purposes, and personal wealth management and trust services. It also has an online-only banking division, Bask Bank, with perks focusing on frequent airline fliers. It operates a nonprofit arm called Texas Capital Bank Foundation.

== Controversy ==
In Late 2020, Texas Capital Bank's stock price rose 93% on consolidation by Bill Hwang's Archegos fund. Archegos' full position amounted to a more than 20% stake in Texas Capital Bank, at its peak. During this time, Archegos was in communication with Texas Capital management about its rising stake, including with Jody Grant, who founded the Bank in 1998. Grant's discussions with Hwang's family office were friendly, and it appears Archegos were supportive of Texas Capital Bank's management.

As the stock price rose towards a two-year high around March 2021, Texas Capital decided to issue 12,000,000 new shares for an aggregate sum of $300 million. Morgan Stanley participated in leading the book building process for the offering, even as Morgan Stanley was also involved in offering Archegos' prime brokerage service and holding Texas Capital's shares for Archegos in that capacity.

In the weeks after Texas Capital's fundraising the company's market value briefly touched US$4.5 billion. Subsequently, Archegos imploded and executives of the fund were charged with fraud.
