= Paul Ferri =

Italian-American businessman (born 1937)

Paul J. Ferri
- Born: December 21, 1937 (age 88); Rome, Italy
- Education: Cornell University; Columbia University; New York University Tandon School of Engineering
- Occupations: Founder and general partner of Matrix Partners

Paul J. Ferri (born December 21, 1937, in Rome, Italy) is the founder and general partner of Matrix Partners, a venture capital firm.

== Early life ==
In 1944, Ferri and his family immigrated to the United States where they settled in Virginia. His father worked for the government as an aeronautics engineer. Ferri's family eventually moved to New York City. Ferri obtained a B.Sc. in electrical engineering from Cornell University, a M.Sc in electrical engineering from the Polytechnic Institute of New York and an M.B.A. from Columbia University.

== Career ==
In 1977, Ferri and Warren Hellman co-founded Hellman Ferri Investment Associates. After five years, the partners split. Hellman started Hellman & Friedman in 1984 and Ferri started Matrix Partners in 1982. In 1999, Ferri co-founded hedge fund Matrix Capital Management with David Goel.
