= Sylebra Capital =

US investment firm

Sylebra Capital LLC
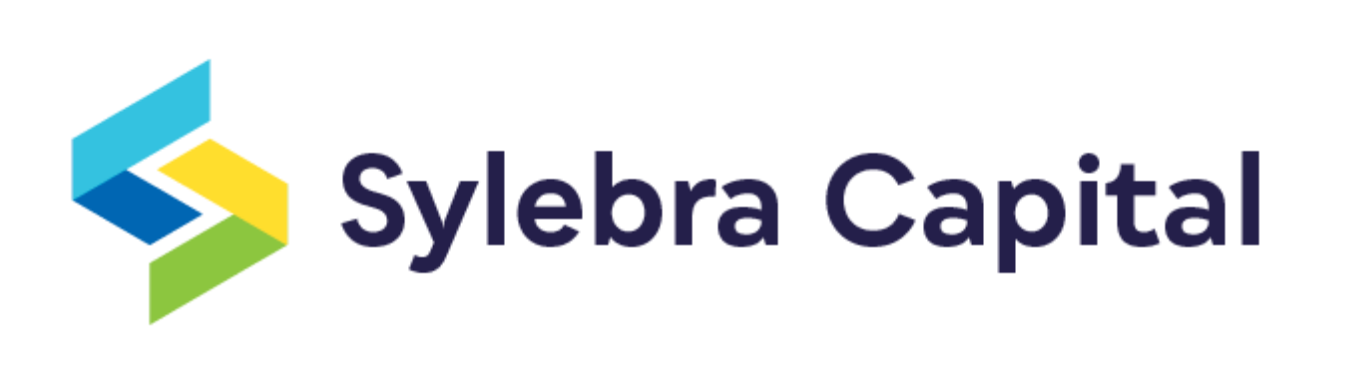
- Type: Private
- Industry: Hedge fund
- Founded: 2011 (15 years ago)
- Founders: Daniel Gibson; Jeff Fieler
- Headquarters: Palo Alto, California, U.S.
- AUM: US$4.7 billion (2024)
- Website: sylebra.com

Sylebra Capital LLC (Sylebra) is a hedge fund management firm headquartered in Palo Alto, California. The firm focuses on investing in mid-cap technology, media and telecommunications (TMT) companies.

== History ==
Sylebra was founded by Daniel Gibson and Jeff Fieler who were previously investment partners at Coatue Management. It had a seed capital of $25 million. The firm was originally based in Hong Kong. Sylebra tells investors that its team is made up of old-fashioned stock pickers who are adept at shorting.

From 2011 to 2016, Sylebra had an annualized return of 23%. For the year of 2018, Sylebra had a return of 11% after making successful bearish bets on technology companies.

In October 2019, Sylebra sued Ronald Perelman and his company Scientific Games Corporation. Sylebra accused Perelman of attempting to increase his control of Scientific Games by forcing Sylebra to sell its stock to the company It sought $290 million in damages blaming the stock's recent selloff on his mismanagement. The lawsuit was eventually dismissed by the court.

In April 2021, it was reported that Sylebra was making significant investments related to special-purpose acquisition companies (SPAC) such as Aeva.

In early 2023, Sylebra moved its headquarters and key employees from Hong Kong to the U.S. It stated despite relocation, its investment strategy that held a low net exposure to lesser known stocks would not change.

In March 2024, it was reported that Sylebra had a return of 22% with half of its gains coming from shorting. A quarter of those gains came specifically from shorting companies that went public via SPAC, a strategy that earned Sylebra $1 billion since the start of 2021. Prior 2024, Sylebra had returns of -1.9%, 22% and -35.1% in 2023, 2022 and 2021 respectively.

In August 2026, Sylebra has raised $277 million for the Equity Capital Solutions Fund, its final close will be by mid 2027. It will primarily focus on high growth businesses in technology.
