= Coatue Management =

American investment management firm

Coatue Management LLC

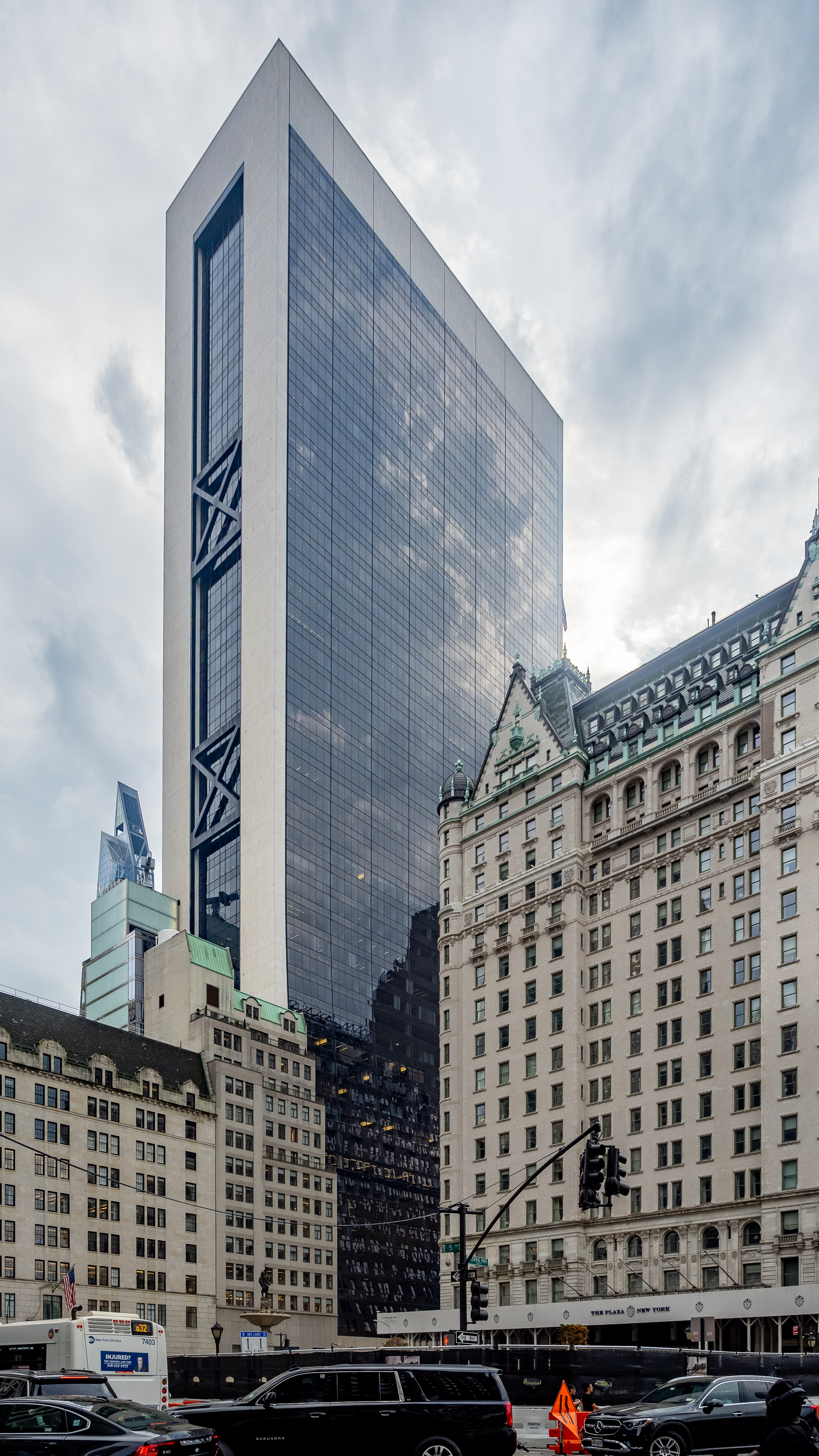
- Headquarters in the Solow Building
- Type: Private
- Industry: Investment management
- Founded: 1999
- Founder: Philippe Laffont; Thomas Laffont
- Headquarters: Solow Building, 9 West 57th Street, New York City, New York, U.S.
- AUM: ▲$70 billion (Q1 2022)
- Number of employees: 157
- Website: www.coatue.com

Coatue Management LLC is an American technology-focused investment management firm led by founder and portfolio manager Philippe Laffont. Coatue invests in both public and private markets, with a focus on technology, media, telecommunications, as well as the consumer and healthcare sectors. Coatue has a global presence with offices located in New York City, Menlo Park, California, London, Shanghai and Hong Kong.

== History ==
Philippe Laffont graduated from MIT in 1989 with a degree in computer science. He worked as an analyst for McKinsey & Company from 1992 to 1994 in Madrid, Spain. After a stint as an independent consultant, he joined Tiger Management LLC as a research analyst in 1996, focusing on European telecommunications stocks.

In 1999, Laffont founded Coatue, becoming a member of the Tiger Cubs - former employees of Tiger management who founded their own hedge funds. Coatue launched its first hedge fund in 1999 with $45 million in capital. Today, Coatue manages this fund in addition to others. Thomas Laffont is the firm's co-founder and leads Coatue's private equity investing.

Coatue's annual "East Meets West" conference features tech entrepreneurs from the U.S. and China.

== Funds ==
Fund	Vintage Year	Committed Capital ($m)
Coatue Private Fund I LP	2013	USD 300
Coatue Private Fund II LP	2015	USD 500
Coatue Kona III LP	2017	USD 1,300
Coatue Early Stage Fund LP	2019	USD 700
Coatue Growth Fund IV LP	2020	USD 3,500

== Investments ==
Some of Coatue's notable investments include the following:

- Airtable
- Ant Financial
- Anthropic
- Anaplan
- ByteDance
- Chime
- Dapper Labs
- Databricks
- DoorDash
- Instacart
- Meituan
- OpenSea
- Snap Inc.
- SoFi
- Spotify
- UiPath
