= Lee Ainslie =

American businessman (born 1964)

- Born: Lee S. Ainslie III; 1964 (age 61–62); Alexandria, Virginia, U.S.
- Education: University of Virginia; University of North Carolina; UNC Kenan–Flagler Business School
- Known for: Founding Maverick Capital
- Title: Managing partner; Maverick Capital; Limited partner; Washington Commanders (NFL)
- Board member of: Robin Hood Foundation
- Spouse: Elizabeth
- Children: 2

Lee S. Ainslie III (born 1964) is an American businessman who founded the hedge fund firm Maverick Capital. He is also a board member of the Robin Hood Foundation and owns a minority stake in the National Football League (NFL) team Washington Commanders.

== Early life and education ==
Ainslie's father was headmaster of Episcopal High School, a boarding school in Alexandria, Virginia, from which Ainslie graduated. Ainslie holds a bachelor's degree from the University of Virginia and an MBA from the University of North Carolina at Chapel Hill Kenan–Flagler Business School.

== Career ==
Prior to founding Maverick Capital in 1993, Ainslie worked at Tiger Management, where he and other former employees had been nicknamed "Tiger Cubs" in the hedge fund industry. Ainslie helped form Maverick Capital in 1993 at the invitation of billionaire Sam Wyly. Maverick Capital was reported to have $9 billion under management in 2013.

Ainslie has been profiled in books such as Hedge Hunters, by Katherine Burton, New Investment Superstars by Lois Peltz. and The Big Win by Stephen Weiss.

Ainslie supported Mitt Romney in the 2012 U.S. presidential election. He is on the board of directors of the Robin Hood Foundation. In 2023, Ainslie was a part of an investment group led by Josh Harris that purchased the Washington Commanders, an American football team belonging to the National Football League (NFL), for $6.05 billion.

== Personal life ==
He and his wife Elizabeth have two sons.
