= Philippe Laffont =

Hedge fund manager

- Born: Belgium
- Education: Massachusetts Institute of Technology
- Occupation: Hedge fund manager
- Known for: Founder Coatue Management LLC
- Spouse: Married
- Website: coatue.com

Philippe Laffont (born 1967) is a French-American hedge fund manager, investor, and philanthropist. He is the founder and chief investment officer of Coatue Management, a global technology focused investment firm managing tens of billions of dollars in assets. Laffont is known for his early investments in transformative technology companies and his roots as a "Tiger Cub” a term for alumni of Julian Robertson’s Tiger Management.

== Early life and education ==
Philippe Laffont was born in Belgium to a French family and holds French nationality. From an early age, he developed a strong interest in computers and technology, and reportedly dreamed of working at Apple as a teenager.

He later moved to the United States to study at the Massachusetts Institute of Technology, where he earned a degree in computer science. Despite his technical background, Laffont later described himself humorously as a “repressed mediocre computer scientist.”

After graduating, he briefly worked at McKinsey & Company in Madrid before moving into finance.

== Career ==
=== Early career ===
Laffont began his professional career as a management consultant at McKinsey & Company in Madrid. He later joined Tiger Management as a research analyst in 1996, where he focused on telecommunications and technology investments.

=== Coatue Management ===
In 1999, Laffont founded Coatue Management, named after a beach on Nantucket Island. The firm specializes in technology, media, and telecommunications sectors and operates in both public and private markets. Under Laffont's leadership, Coatue has become one of the most prominent tech-focused hedge funds globally, with assets under management estimated to range from $25 billion to $46 billion.

Coatue has invested in major public companies such as Amazon, Meta Platforms, Microsoft, Nvidia, and Taiwan Semiconductor Manufacturing Company (TSMC). The firm is also active in venture capital, backing private companies including ByteDance, Snap, DoorDash, and OpenAI.

==== Recognition ====
Laffont has been featured in several rankings of top hedge fund managers and billionaire investors. He is frequently cited as one of the most influential figures in tech investing and has appeared in Forbes’ lists of top hedge fund earners.
