= Ole Andreas Halvorsen =

Norwegian-American hedge fund manager (born 1961)

Andreas Halvorsen
- Born: 1961 (age 64–65); Borge, Norway
- Education: Williams College; Stanford University
- Occupation: hedge fund manager
- Known for: Founder and CEO, Viking Global Investors
- Spouse: Diane Halvorsen
- Children: 3

Ole Andreas Halvorsen (born 1961) is a Norwegian-American billionaire hedge fund manager. He is the CEO and a co-founder of the Connecticut-based hedge fund Viking Global Investors. Viking had $24 billion under management as of October, 2017. Halvorsen has consistently ranked among the top earning hedge fund managers, placing 11th in Forbes' 2012 rankings and 9th in 2015, according to Institutional Investor's Alpha.

Halvorsen is a protégé of hedge fund manager Julian Robertson. As of August 2022, his net worth was estimated at US$6.6 billion.

== Early life ==
Halvorsen was born in Borge, Norway in 1961. He graduated from the Norwegian Naval Academy and then served as a leader of a Norwegian SEAL team.

Halvorsen attended Williams College, where he was a member of the ski team, and graduated in 1986 with a degree in economics. He went on to receive his MBA from the Stanford University Graduate School of Business in 1990. At Stanford, he received the Alexander A. Robichek Student Achievement Award in Finance and was an Arjay Miller Scholar. Halvorsen is now on Williams' Board of Trustees.

== Investment career ==
Halvorsen worked in the investment banking division of Morgan Stanley after finishing his studies. Then he moved to Tiger Management Corp, where he was a senior managing director, as well as an analyst and director of equities, and a member of the management committee. He sat on Tiger's advisory board, and on the supervisory board of the firm's largest fund, Jaguar Fund N.V..

In 1999, Halvorsen left Tiger to co-found Viking Global Investors, an investment firm managing capital in excess of $30 billion, of which he is currently the CEO, alongside David Ott and Brian Olson. Halvorsen, Ott, and Olson are part of the group known as "Tiger Cubs," former employees of Julian Robertson's Tiger Management Corporation now working as hedge fund managers on their own. Viking Global's main operations cover public equity and hedge funds on the international market.

== Personal life ==
He is married to Diane Halvorsen; they have three children and live in Darien, Connecticut.

Halvorsen is on the board of trustees of the Sterling and Francine Clark Art Institute located in Williamstown, Massachusetts, and the board of Williams College.

Previously, Halvorsen has been a trustee of Greenwich Academy, a board member of Right To Play USA, and sat on the advisory council of the Stanford Graduate School of Business.
