= Lee Fixel =

American venture capitalist and investor

- Born: 1980 (age 45–46); Florida
- Citizenship: American
- Education: Washington University in St. Louis
- Occupations: Venture Capitalist, Investor
- Known for: Founder of Addition

Lee Jared Fixel is an American venture capitalist and investor. He is the founder of venture capital firm, Addition.

== Early life and education ==
Fixel was born in 1980 and was raised near Fort Lauderdale, Florida. He is the eldest of three children and has two younger sisters.

Fixel earned a Bachelor of Science in business administration, finance, and accounting at the Olin Business School at Washington University in St. Louis.

== Career ==
After graduation, Fixel became a licensed chartered financial analyst and began his career at Alkeon Capital Management, an investment firm.

In 2006, Fixel joined Tiger Global Management, a New York-based investment firm. He became a partner and head of the firm's private equity business, before his resignation in March 2019. In a letter received by Reuters in March 2019, Fixel said he planned to continue investing independently. He has also served on the board of Peloton. Among his most notable portfolio investments are Stripe, Peloton, Freshworks, and Spotify, as well as late-stage investments, including Facebook and the Indian e-commerce company Flipkart.

As of 2024, he has appeared on Forbes' Midas List twelve times over the course of his career.

In 2020, Fixel launched the venture capital firm Addition and raised $1.3 billion to invest in early- and growth-stage startup companies.

== Philanthropy ==
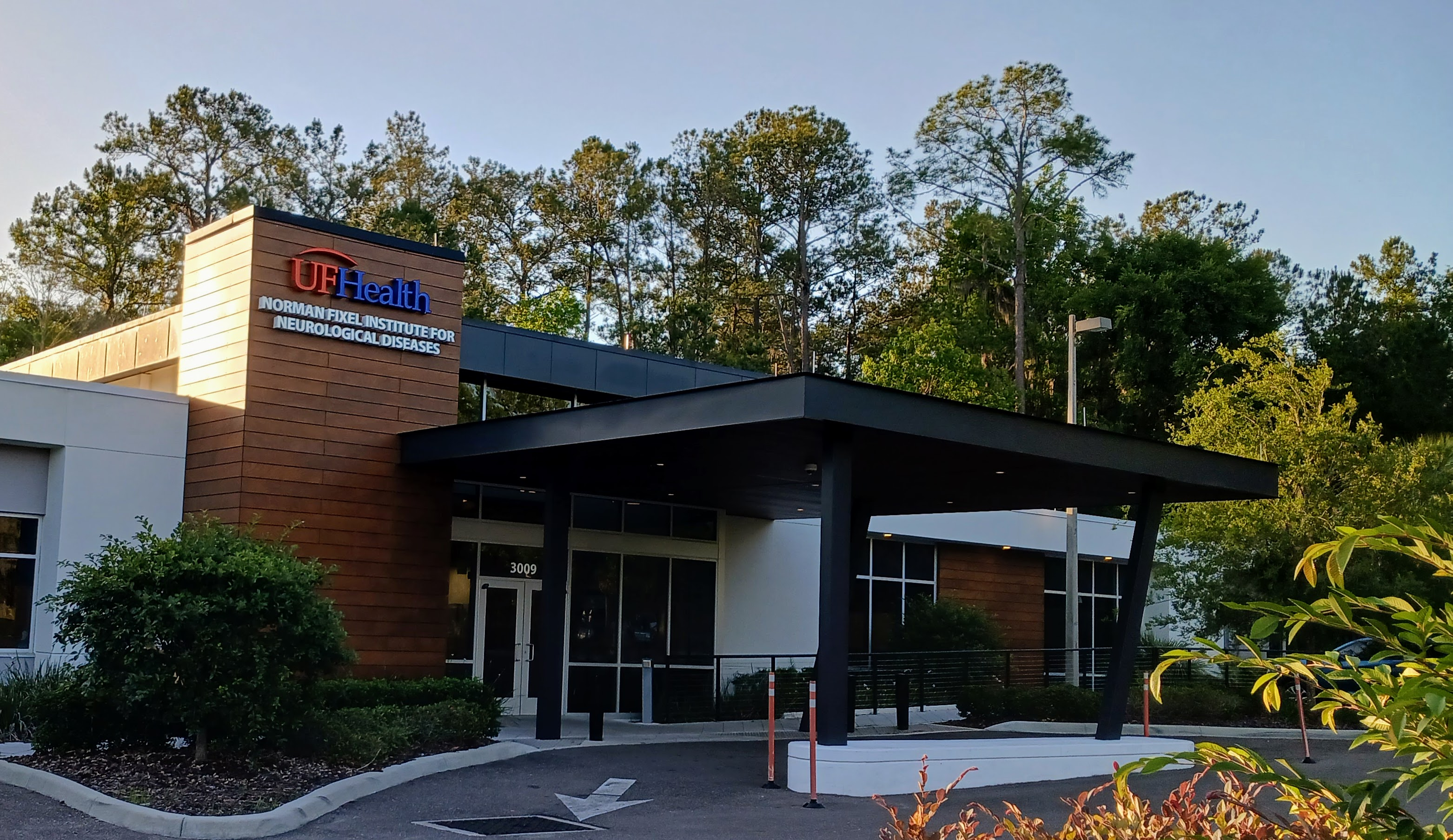
The Norman Fixel Institute for Neurological Diseases in Gainesville, Florida.

Fixel, along with his wife, Lauren Fixel, co-founded the Lauren and Lee Fixel Family Foundation. Together, the Fixels are one of the most significant contributors to The Michael J. Fox Foundation, a non-profit organization dedicated to Parkinson's disease research.

In January 2019, the Lauren and Lee Fixel Family Foundation donated $20 million to the University of Florida and UF Health to establish the Norman Fixel Institute for Neurological Diseases. The institute is focused on advancing research, technology, and clinical care for Parkinson's and other neurodegenerative diseases such as Alzheimer's disease and Amyotrophic lateral sclerosis (ALS). In February 2025, the foundation supported the launch of the Food and Agriculture Research Mission (FARM) at Washington University in St. Louis, a research initiative aimed at improving food production and distribution.
