= Toscafund Asset Management =

British investment company

- Type: Private company
- Industry: Asset management
- Founded: 2000; 26 years ago
- Founder: Martin Hughes
- Headquarters: London, United Kingdom
- Key people: Martin Hughes (CEO)
- Products: Investments
- AUM: US$2 billion (2025)
- Website: Official website

Toscafund Asset Management is a British specialist investment firm which is a major investor in a number of companies including Circle Health Ltd.

As of 2020, it had assets of £4 billion. The Chief Executive is ex Tiger Management employee, Martin Hughes, nicknamed, according to The Times, the 'Rottweiler'. Dr Savvas P Savouri is the chief economist and a partner in the firm.

== History ==
Starting in 2016, it was involved in a long term argument with Speedy Hire, where it was a major investor, attempting to replace the chairman, Jan Astrand, whom it accuses of “egregious corporate governance failings”. In September 2017, Toscafund Asset Management launched 300 million euro ($359.34 million) private equity fund that focus on small and mid-sized companies.

In December 2019, Toscafund purchased 12% of Ted Baker following the decline in the company's share price.

In January 2020, Toscafund announced that it owned 11.70% of the Stobart Group, this was subsequently increased to 18.8%.

In December 2020, Toscafund announced that it had sealed a takeover of TalkTalk Group which valued TalkTalk at £1.1 billion, taking it private. Toscafund was previously TalkTalk's second largest investor.
