= Stephen Mandel (hedge fund manager) =

American hedge fund manager, investor, and philanthropist

Stephen Mandel Jr.
- Born: March 12, 1956 (age 70)
- Citizenship: United States
- Education: Dartmouth College (BA); Harvard University (MBA)
- Known for: Founding and leading Lone Pine Capital
- Board member of: Dartmouth College; Teach for America
- Spouse: Susan Joy Zadek
- Children: 3

Stephen Frank Mandel Jr. (born March 12, 1956) is an American hedge fund manager, investor, and philanthropist. He founded Lone Pine Capital in 1997, after working as the managing director at Tiger Management. According to Forbes, Mandel has an estimated net worth of US$3.9 billion as of August 2022.

== Early life ==
Mandel is the son of Ann (née Safford) and Stephen Frank Mandel, and was raised in Darien, Connecticut. He has a brother, Edward Safford Mandel. In 1974, Mandel graduated from the Phillips Exeter Academy. In 1978, he graduated from Dartmouth College with a Bachelor of Arts in government and was a member of the Psi Upsilon fraternity. He also has an M.B.A. from Harvard University.

== Investment career ==
From 1982 to 1984, he worked at Mars & Co as a senior consultant and then from 1984 to 1990, he worked as a consumer-retail analyst at Goldman Sachs before working as a consumer analyst and eventually managing director at Tiger Management, a hedge fund founded by Julian Robertson. Robertson, himself a billionaire, referred to Mandel as "probably the greatest analyst of all time."

In 1997, he left Tiger Management with backing from Robertson, and founded his own hedge fund, Lone Pine Capital (named after a Dartmouth College pine tree that survived an 1887 lightning strike).

Forbes listed Stephen Mandel as one of the 40 Highest-Earning hedge fund managers in 2012, one of the top 25 in 2013, and one of the top 15 in 2018.

As of January 2019, Mandel will no longer manage investments for his Lone Pine Capital but will remain a managing director.

== Wealth and philanthropy ==
According to Forbes Magazine, Mandel has a net worth of $3.9 billion as of October 2021. An increase of $1.1B, when compared to the Forbes 400 List, released October 2020.

He was chairman of Dartmouth's board of trustees and was previously chair of the national board of directors at Teach for America. He founded two charitable foundations: the Zoom Foundation and the Lone Pine Foundation. Mandel donated $2 million to the Lincoln Project, an anti-Donald Trump super PAC. Mandel donated $16,179,889 to the Democrats in the 2020 election cycle, making him the 22nd largest donor that year.

As of August 2026, Mandel spent $25.9 million in support of Democratic candidates in the 2026 United States elections.

== Personal life ==
In 1982, he married Susan Joy Zadek of Baltimore, whom he met at Harvard. They have three children. His wife is a trustee of the Environmental Defense Fund.
