= The Meadowbrook School of Weston =

Coordinates: 42.3540°N 71.2723°W

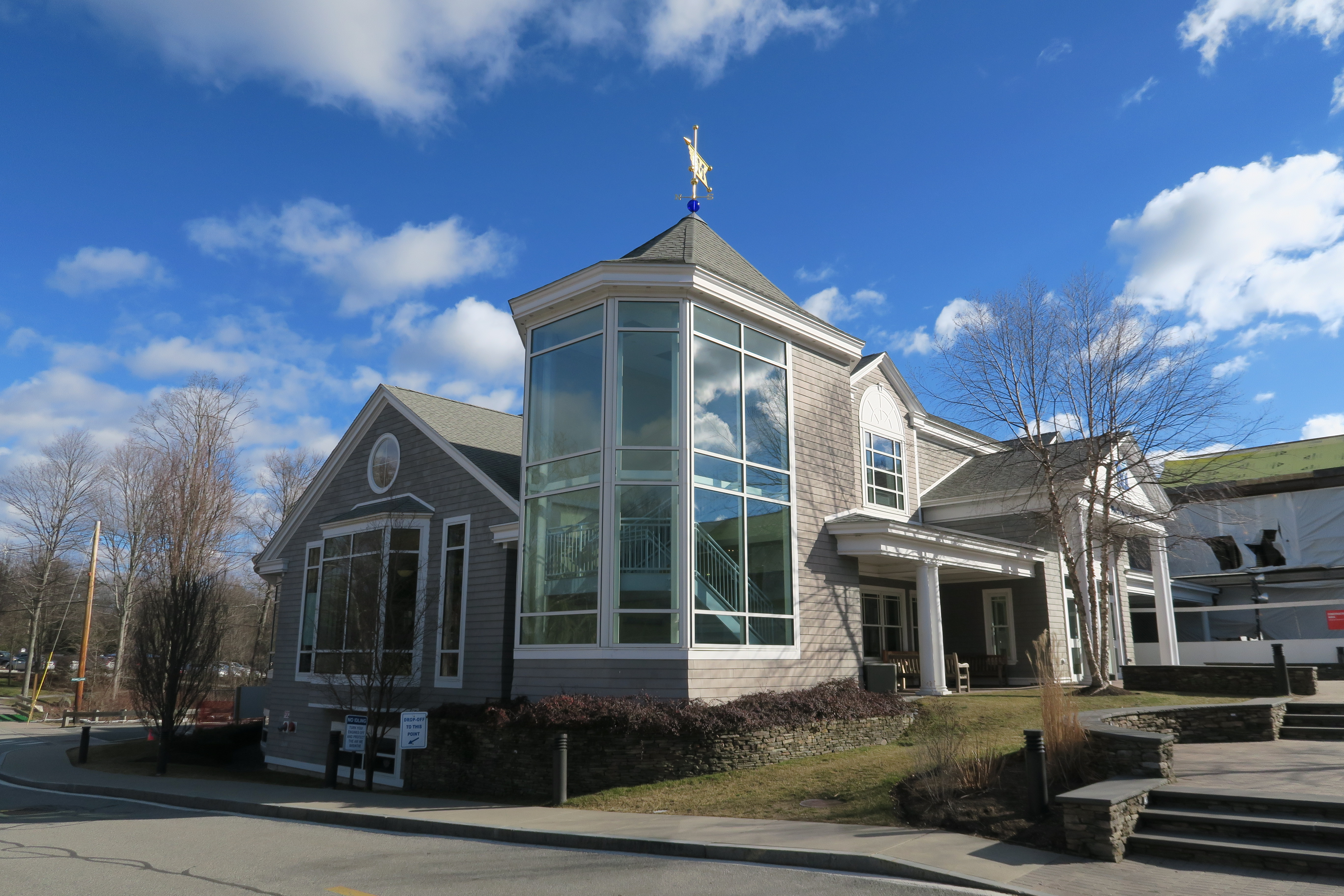
- The Meadowbrook School of Weston
- Weston, Massachusetts; United States

Information
- Type: private coeducational
- Motto: We know, love, and challenge every child.
- Established: 1924
- Headmaster: arvind s. grover
- Faculty: 76
- Grades: JK-8
- Enrollment: ~300
- Campus: Suburban
- Colors: Navy Blue, White
- Mascot: Moose
- Website: www.meadowbrook-ma.org

The Meadowbrook School of Weston is a coeducational, nonsectarian, independent day school for students in grades from junior kindergarten through eight. Meadowbrook is located on a 36-acre campus in Weston, Massachusetts, US, enrolls approximately 300 students, and employs 76 faculty and staff. The faculty:student ratio is 1:7.

== History ==
The Meadowbrook School was founded in 1923 by Robert Winsor on its current grounds in Weston, Massachusetts, following the Pigeon Hill School in the same area in 1903. Winsor donated the present land and collaborated with parents to design the school.

Meadowbrook School founded a middle school in 2001 and expanded its curriculum to add a seventh and an eighth grade.
