= Vipshop =

Chinese e-commerce company

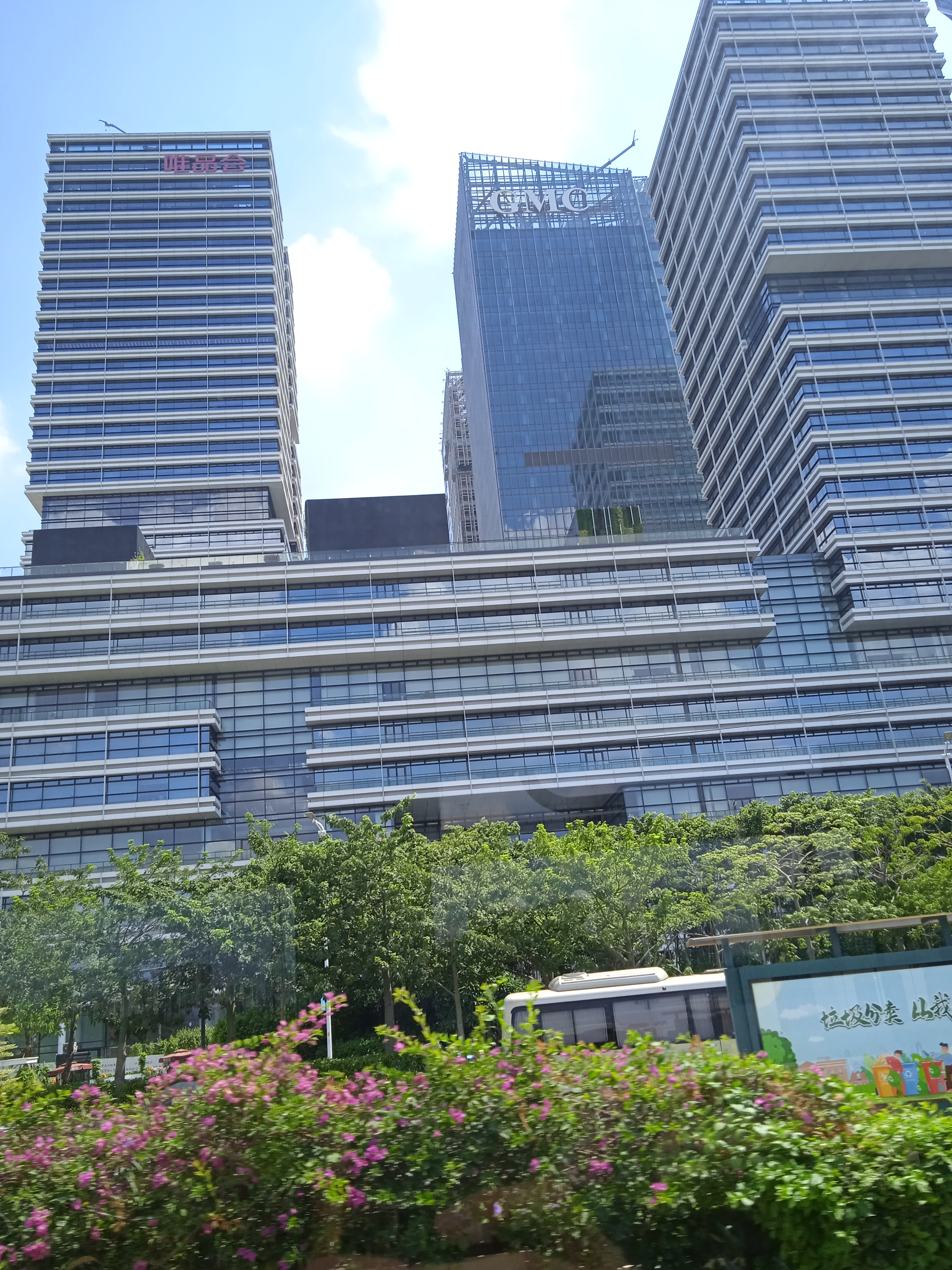
- Vipshop Headquarters Building in Guangzhou taken in 2021
- Type: Public
- Traded as: NYSE: VIPS
- Industry: E-commerce
- Founded: December 2008; 17 years ago
- Founders: Eric Ya Shen, Arthur Xiaobo Hong
- Headquarters: Guangzhou
- Area served: Mainland China
- Owner: Vipshop Holdings Ltd
- Website: www.vip.com

Vipshop (Chinese: 唯品会; pinyin: Wei Pin Hui) is a Chinese company that operates the e-commerce website VIP.com (formerly Vipshop.com) specializing in online discount sales. Vipshop is based out of Guangzhou, Guangdong, China, and was listed on New York Stock Exchange (NYSE) on March 23, 2012.

As of 2017, Vipshop had 52.1 million customers, and there were 269.8 million orders for the year 2016. Following Tmall and JD.com, it became the third largest e-commerce site in China.

According to the US Fortune magazine, VIP.com ranked the 115th in its 2017 China 500 listing as well as the top 3 B2C e-commerce retailer. The 2017 Top 250 Global Powers of Retailing co-authored by Deloitte and STORES Media listed VIP.com as the world's fastest growing retailer. And in BrandZ™ Top 100 Most Valuable Chinese Brands 2017, VIP.com ranked 40th.

== History ==
- 8 December 2008: Vipshop.com went online
- 2010 and 2011: Completed 2 rounds of VC financing at 70 million US dollars
- March 2012: Listed on New York Stock Exchange (VIPS)
- November 2013: Transferred to new domain name VIP.com
- September 2014: Launched VIP International
- 2015: Began to run its own logistics & distribution system
- 2016: Launched INTERNET financing business "Wei pin Hua" (Chinese: 唯品花; pinyin: Wei Pin Hua)
- 2017: Announced to spin off financing service and reconstruct its logistics business

== Sales model ==
According to I Research, VIP.com's on-line discount sales model is one of the three mainstream e-commerce models in China (the other two are market place model of Tmall and general B2C model of JD). And VIP.com is ranked No.1 in China's on-line discount market with 38.1% market share.

According to the 2015 Q3-2016 Q4 "China B2C online shopping market share monitoring report" released by Analysys, VIP.com has ranked No.3 in terms of B2C market share consecutively for the last 6 quarters. VIP.com has become the world's largest flash sale platform as well as the third-largest online retailer in China.

== Metrics ==
According to VIP.com, over 20,000 brands have cooperated with VIP.com, serving more than 300 million users across China; of the total, more than 2,200 brands have developed exclusive online cooperation with VIP.com. Following Tmall and JingDong, VIP.com is now the third largest e-commerce site in China.

In 2016, VIP.com reported annual net revenue of US$2.73 billion and a total of 269.8 million orders.

As of March 31, 2017, VIP.com had been profitable for 18 consecutive quarters.

The revenue of VIP.com in first quarter of 2020 only reached CN¥18.8 billion. The yoy rate of first-quarter revenue is -11.85% compare to 2019.

In August 2020, VIP.com released financial report for second quarter with net revenue of CN¥ 24.1 billion and net profit of CN¥1.536 billion.

== Financial services ==
Internet Finance Division was founded at the end of 2015. With one year's development, "VIP Expense", a consumer finance product, had attracted 5 million new users. Currently, 15% of orders at Vip.com are paid through the "VIP Expense".

During the "12.8" Anniversary celebration sales period in 2016, the average transaction value per customer paid through "VIP Expense" was 45% higher than that of the overall transaction and the user activity rate improved by 27%.

In 2016, the average monthly new user growth of "VIP Expense" stood above 30%.
