= Julian Robertson =

American hedge fund manager (1932–2022)

Julian Robertson KNZM
- Born: June 25, 1932; Salisbury, North Carolina, U.S.
- Died: August 23, 2022 (aged 90); New York City, U.S.
- Education: University of North Carolina at Chapel Hill
- Occupations: Hedge fund manager and philanthropist
- Spouse: Josephine Tucker Robertson (m. 1972; died 2010)
- Children: 3

Julian Hart Robertson Jr. KNZM (June 25, 1932 – August 23, 2022) was an American hedge fund manager, and philanthropist.

Robertson founded Tiger Management, one of the first hedge funds, in 1980. From its inception in 1980 to its 1998 asset peak, his fund returned 31.7% per year after fees, compared to a 12.7% annual return from the S&P 500 over the same period. However, a sharp decline thereafter led to the fund closing in March 2000. Tiger showed losses in only four of its 21 years. Robertson later mentored and provided seed funding to many notable hedge fund managers, known as the Tiger cubs, including Ole Andreas Halvorsen, Stephen Mandel of Lone Pine Capital, Lee Ainslie of Maverick Capital, Bill Hwang, and Chase Coleman III.

In 2020, Forbes deputy wealth editor Jennifer Wang awarded Robertson a perfect philanthropy score of 5, the highest possible rating; placing him among an exclusive group of just ten Forbes 400 members, alongside Warren Buffett, George Soros, Eli Broad, and others who have each given away at least 20% of their fortune.

During his lifetime, Robertson contributed more than US$2 billion to charity. He was also a signatory to The Giving Pledge. At the time of his death, his net worth was estimated at $4.8 billion.

== Early life ==
Robertson was born on June 25, 1932, in Salisbury, North Carolina, as the son of Julian Hart Robertson Sr., a textile company executive, and Blanche Spencer, a local activist. He claimed that his father was a descendant of Pocahontas. Robertson first became interested in stocks at age 6.

He graduated from Episcopal High School in 1951 and the University of North Carolina at Chapel Hill in 1955. While at Chapel Hill, he was admitted to Zeta Psi fraternity and was a member of the Reserve Officers' Training Corps. He then served as an officer in the U.S. Navy, traveling the world aboard a munitions ship until 1957.

After leaving the navy, Robertson moved to New York City and worked for a time as a stockbroker for Kidder, Peabody & Company. At Kidder, he eventually headed the firm's asset management division, Webster Securities. In 1978, he took a sabbatical and moved with his family to New Zealand for a year to write a novel.

== Investment career ==
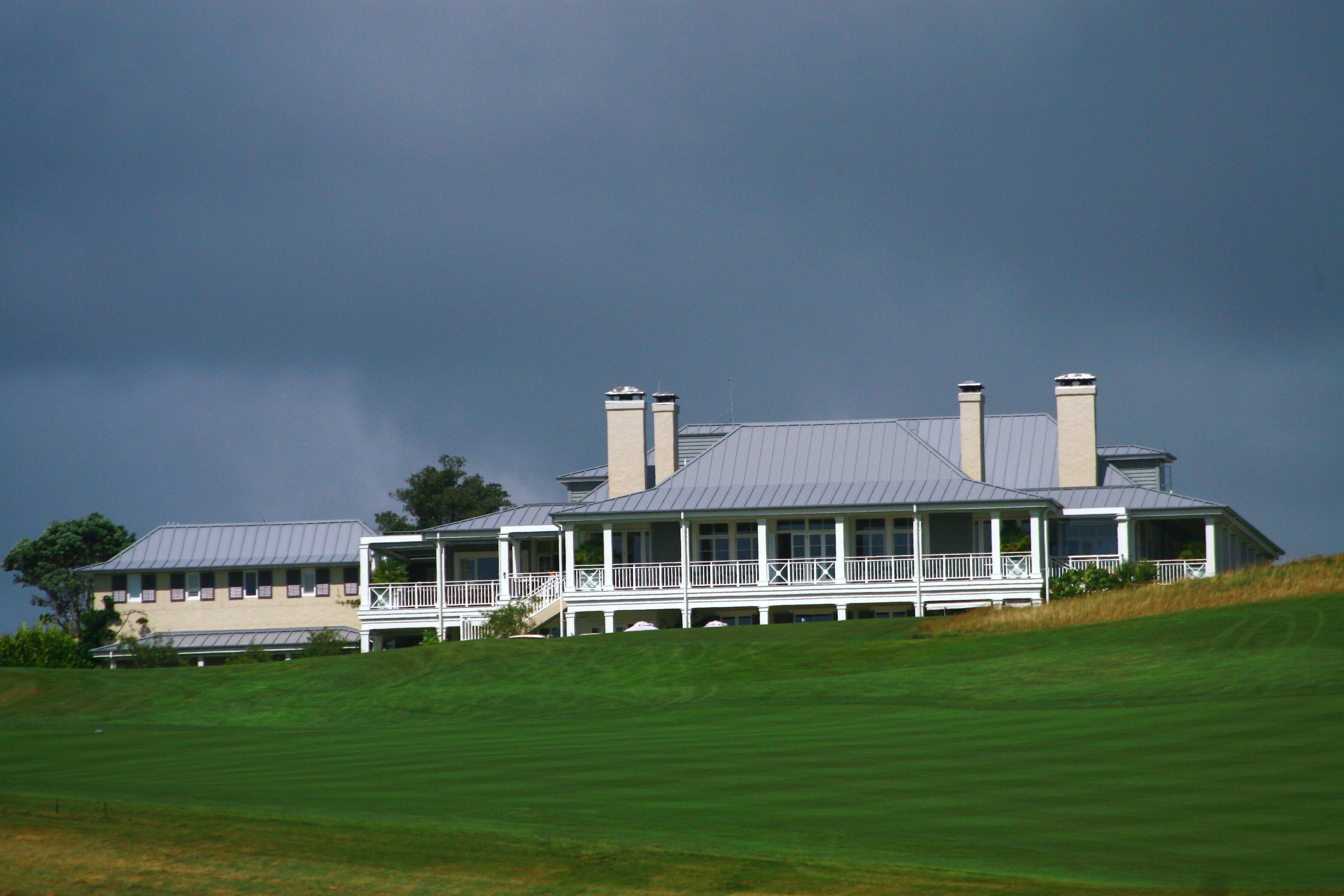
Kauri Cliffs Lodge near Matauri Bay

On his return to the United States, in 1980, with $8 million of funding from family, friends, and his own wealth, he founded Tiger Management. The Tiger funds reached a peak of $22 billion in assets in 1998. Robertson's Tiger Fund accurately predicted the dot-com bubble, purposely underweighting the technology sector. Tiger's largest holding was US Airways; it controlled 25% of the company. Its troubles led to significant losses for the fund. Tiger also realized significant losses in the Japanese Yen. Such missteps ultimately led him to close his investment company in late March 2000, at the peak of the dot-com bubble, and return all outside capital to investors. Revolting employees wanting to invest in the dot-com bubble are also cited as the reason behind closing.

Robertson said in 2008 that he shorted subprime securities and used credit default swaps to make a 76.7% return on investment in 2007. From the closure of his fund in 2000 until January 2008, his return on his personal fortune was 403%. After closing his fund in 2000, Robertson supported and financed upcoming hedge fund managers in return for a stake in their fund management companies.

Robertson was an investor and developer in New Zealand and owned three lodges: Kauri Cliffs Lodge near Matauri Bay in Northland; Matakauri Lodge Queenstown; and The Farm at Cape Kidnappers, Hawkes Bay, as well as several wineries.

== Personal life ==
=== Family ===
Julian married Josephine Tucker Robertson in 1972. She died in June 2010 from breast cancer. They had three children.

=== Politics ===
While Robertson was a Republican, he urged the party to support clean energy policies and contributed $500,000 to the ClearPath Foundation in 2016. Robertson supported the Mitt Romney 2012 presidential campaign, and Romney attended Robertson's 80th birthday party in 2012. In January 2012, Robertson donated $1.25 million to Restore Our Future, a Super PAC supporting the Mitt Romney 2012 presidential campaign. In 2015, Robertson gave $1 million to a Super PAC supporting the Jeb Bush 2016 presidential campaign. Although Robertson did not support Donald Trump in the 2016 election, instead supporting libertarian Gary Johnson, Robertson was a supporter of the presidency of Donald Trump and the Tax Cuts and Jobs Act of 2017. He contributed $100,000 to Donald Trump's 2020 presidential campaign. Robertson supported the estate tax.

=== Residences ===
Robertson owned residences on Central Park South in Manhattan, on Long Island in Nassau County, as well as in Sun Valley, the Hamptons, and in New Zealand. In 2020, Robertson completed construction of three new homes, each approximately 4,000 square feet, for his family in New Zealand.

Robertson kept track of where he spent his time and won a legal case after he proved that he did not spend enough time in New York to be liable for income taxes in the state.

=== Death ===
Robertson died at his home in Manhattan on August 23, 2022, aged 90.

== Legacy and awards ==
In 2008, he was inducted into Institutional Investors Alpha's Hedge Fund Manager Hall of Fame. Robertson was appointed an Honorary Knight Companion of the New Zealand Order of Merit, for services to business and philanthropy, in the 2010 New Year Honours, and in 2017, he was one of nine people awarded a Carnegie Medal of Philanthropy.

For three years beginning in September 2026, The European Avant-Garde: From Monet to Picasso, a selection of paintings from Robertson's personal collection, will be on view at the Blanton Museum in Austin. Included are works by Henri Fantin-Latour, Paul Gauguin, André Derain, Wassily Kandinsky, Pablo Picasso, and others.

== Legal issues ==
On April 1, 1996, BusinessWeek carried a cover story written by reporter Gary Weiss, called "Fall of the Wizard", that was critical of Robertson's performance and behavior as founder and manager of Tiger Management. Robertson subsequently sued Weiss and BusinessWeek for $1 billion for defamation. The suit was settled with no money changing hands and BusinessWeek standing by the substance of its reporting.

== See also ==
- List of University of North Carolina at Chapel Hill alumni
- List of Tiger Cubs
