= Tiger Management =

American hedge fund

Tiger Management Corp.
- Type: Private
- Industry: Investment management
- Founded: 1980; 46 years ago
- Founder: Julian Robertson
- Headquarters: New York City, U.S.
- Products: Hedge funds
- Number of employees: 97

Tiger Management Corp. is an American hedge fund and family office founded by Julian Robertson. The fund began investing in 1980 and wound down in March 2000-01. It continues to operate in direct public equity investments and seeding new investment funds. It is colloquially known as the "Tiger Fund", with its alumni commonly referred to as "tiger cubs".

== History ==
Julian Robertson, a stockbroker and former United States Navy officer, started Tiger Management in 1980 with $8 million in capital. By 1996, the fund’s assets had increased to $7.2 billion in value. On April 1, 1996 BusinessWeek carried a cover story written by reporter Gary Weiss, called "Fall of the Wizard", that was critical of Robertson's performance and behavior as founder and manager of Tiger Management. Robertson subsequently sued Weiss and BusinessWeek for $1 billion for defamation. The suit was settled with no money changing hands and BusinessWeek standing by the substance of its reporting.

With $10.5 billion of assets under management in 1997, it was the second largest hedge fund in the world at the time. Its holdings climbed to $22 billion in 1998. However, in the late 1990s, Tiger Management faced challenges. The fund incurred significant losses during the 1998 Russian financial crisis and Long-Term Capital Management crisis and struggled to recover. Additionally, Robertson expressed concerns about the increasing market volatility and what he viewed as an irrational exuberance in technology stocks during the dot-com bubble.

Tiger's largest equity holding at that time was U.S. Airways, whose financial troubles dragged down the value of the fund's holdings. Such missteps ultimately led him to close his investment company in March 2000 and return all outside capital to investors. Tiger earlier made $2 billion in gains, but gave most of them back during a huge one-day move in the yen in 1998. In September 2001, Robertson distributed 24.8 million greatly devalued U.S. Airways shares over to former investors in Tiger. Robertson declared his intent to keep the stock. U.S. Airways declared Chapter 11 bankruptcy in 2002, and shareholders in the airline were wiped out.

== Aftermath and legacy ==
After closing his Tiger Fund in 2000, Robertson started to use his own capital, experience, and infrastructure to support and finance ("seed") upcoming hedge fund managers. As of September 2009, Robertson had helped launch 38 hedge funds ("Tiger Seeds") in return for a stake in their fund management companies. Apart from those Tiger Seeds, a considerable number of analysts and managers Robertson employed and mentored at Tiger Management went out on their own and are now running some of the best-known hedge fund firms, called "Tiger Cubs", run by Tiger alumni such as Ole Andreas Halvorsen, Chris Shumway, Lee Ainslie, Stephen Mandel, John Griffin, Philippe Laffont, Dan Morehead, David Gerstenhaber, David Goel, Chase Coleman, Martin Hughes, Bill Hwang and Paul Touradji.

"The modern-day emergence of hedge funds can be attributed to a 1986 article in the Institutional Investor highlighting the extraordinary returns of the Tiger Fund. The article spurred investor interest and financing; since that time, hedge funds have increasingly attracted investment and human capital."

The Wall Street Journal reported in June 2010, that Robertson was considering reopening his firm to outside investors. John Townsend, a former partner at Goldman Sachs, was hired as the chief operating officer, and Robertson's son Alex joined the firm. The new hires were part of a potential expansion that could involve creating a "seeding" fund or a fund of hedge funds for outside investors. According to Institutional Investor magazine, that year many of the Tiger-seeded funds were struggling.
