= Conquest of New Netherland =

1664 English invasion

- Part of the Second Anglo-Dutch War
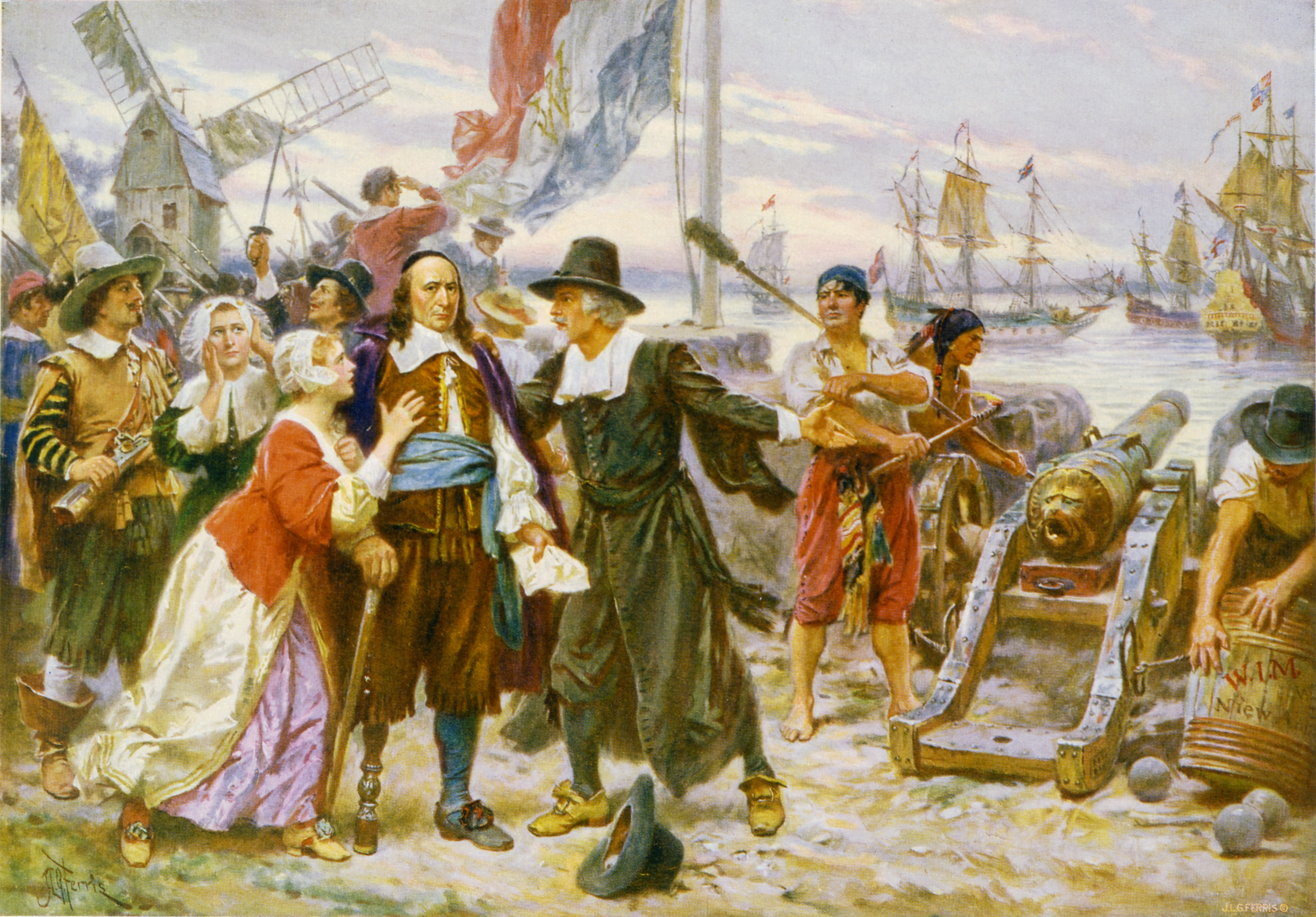
- "The Fall of New Amsterdam" by Jean Leon Gerome Ferris
Date	May 25, 1664 – October 4, 1664
Location	New Amsterdam, New Netherland
Result	English victory: Surrender of New Netherland; Start of the Second Anglo-Dutch War

Belligerents
England	Dutch Republic

Commanders and leaders
Richard Nicolls; Samuel Maverick	Peter Stuyvesant; Johannes de Decker

Strength
4 warships	Unknown

Casualties and losses
None	3 killed 10 wounded

The conquest of New Netherland occurred in 1664 as an English expedition led by Richard Nicolls that arrived in New York Harbor effected a peaceful capture of New Amsterdam and Fort Amsterdam, and the Articles of Surrender of New Netherland were agreed. The conquest was mostly peaceful in the rest of the colony as well, except for some fighting in New Amstel.

== Background ==
The commercial rivalry between the Dutch and the English, which provoked the First Anglo-Dutch War, was not resolved by the Treaty of Westminster (1654). Hostilities continued between the countries' trading companies. During the Anglo-Spanish War of 1654–1660, Dutch traders supplanted the English in trade with Spain and its possessions in Italy and America. After the Stuart Restoration of 1660, religious and political differences between the mostly Church of England royalists in England and the Calvinist republicans who ruled the Netherlands also hampered peace.

Conflict developed between the States of Holland and King Charles II's sister Mary, the widowed Princess of Orange, over the education and future prospects of her son William of Orange. Charles was influenced by his brother James and by Henry Bennet, 1st Earl of Arlington as he sought a popular and lucrative foreign war at sea to bolster his authority as king. Many naval officers welcomed the prospect of a conflict with the Dutch.

In the year before the invasion, Captain John Scott harassed several Dutch settlements on Long Island.

== Campaign ==
=== Surrender of New Amsterdam ===
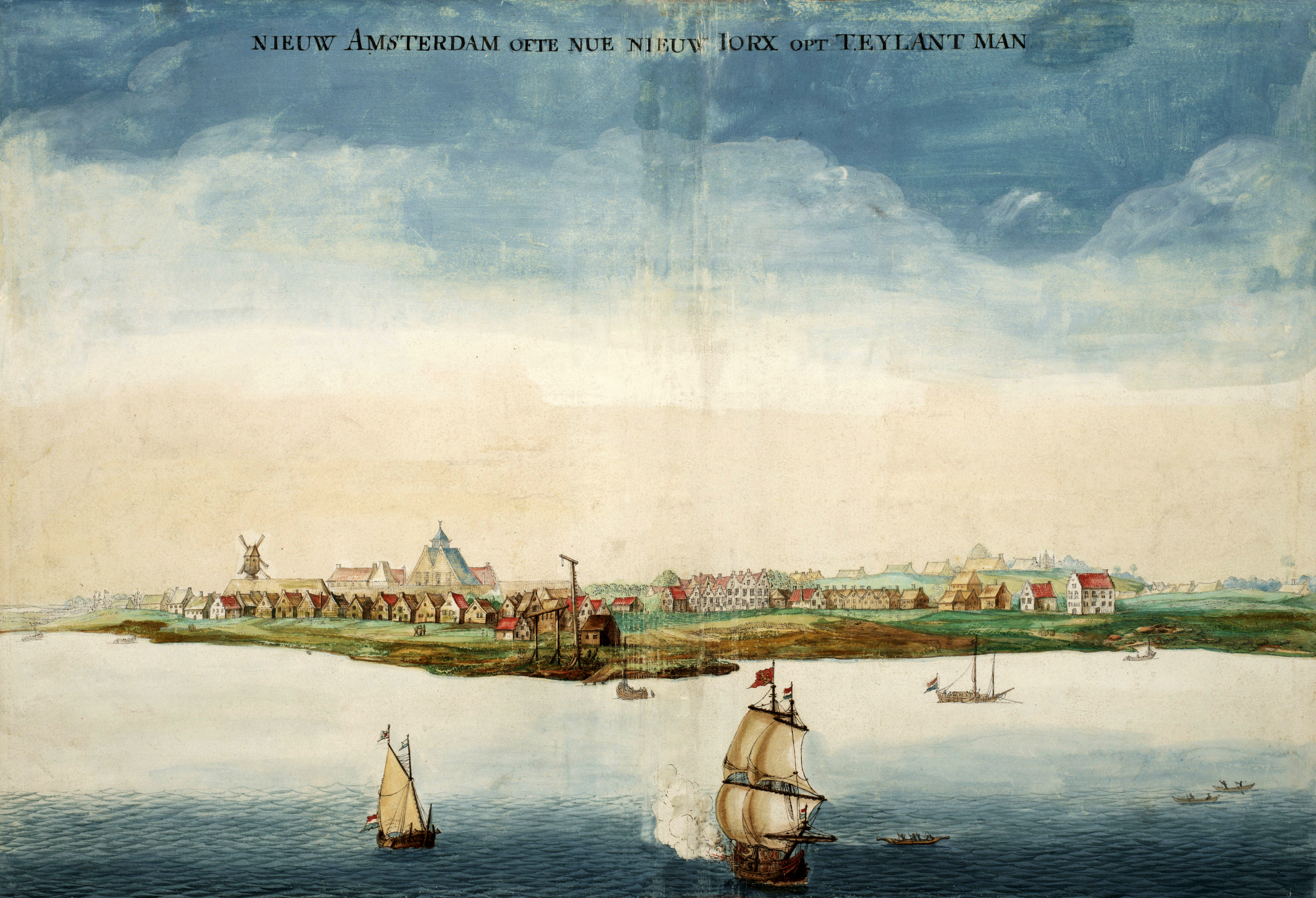
A 1664 illustration of New Netherland

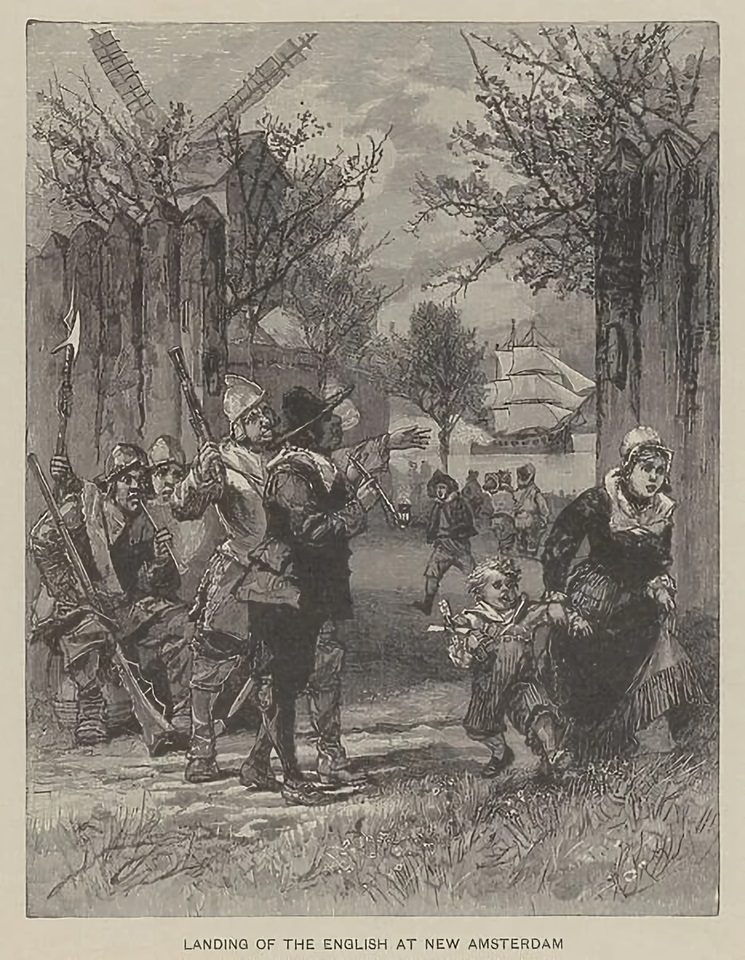
Landing of the English at New Amsterdam 1664

In March 1664, Charles granted American territory between the Delaware and Connecticut rivers to his brother James, Duke of York. On May 25, 1664 Colonel Richard Nicolls set out from Portsmouth with four warships led by the HMS Guinea, and about three hundred soldiers. They arrived at Gravesend Bay on Long Island on August 27 and enlisted the support of militias from the English towns there as they moved west to Breuckelen. Having arrived at Fort Amsterdam on Manhattan Island, Nicolls sent director-general Peter Stuyvesant a letter offering lenient terms of surrender. James authorized generous terms because he preferred the profits of an intact colony to the spoils of a ruined one. Despite Fort Amsterdam's limited supply of gunpowder, Stuyvesant was inclined to resist. On September 4, the English ships began to maneuver closer to the fort. Stuyvesant was confronted by ninety-three burghers and his own son, and conceded.

A group of prominent merchants then met at Stuyvesant Farm with Nicolls' officers to draft Articles of Capitulation. The Dutch colonists were guaranteed in the possession of their property rights, their laws of inheritance, and the enjoyment of religious freedom. Article 2 specified that all "publick houses" would remain open. The Articles were signed on September 6, 1664 onboard ship by Johannes de Decker, Stuyvesant's lawyer and chief negotiator. The following day being Sunday the transfer did not take place until September 8 when the Dutch forces marched down Beaver Street and embarked on board the Gideon bound for Holland, and Nicolls assumed the position of deputy-governor.

=== Surrender of Fort Orange ===
On September 10, Johannes de Decker sailed north to Fort Orange to warn them the English were coming and to rally opposition. Nicolls sent troops to demand the fort's peaceful surrender. Realizing that control of the mouth of the river controlled the settlement's future, on September 24, 1664 vice-director of New Netherland Johannes de Montagne surrendered the fort to the English and Colonel George Cartwright took command. The next day, Captain John Manning was given charge of the fort, which was renamed Fort Albany, after the Duke of York's title in the Peerage of Scotland. While he was there, Cartwright renewed the Dutch treaty with the Iroquois.

On his way back down river, Cartwright landed at Esopus and the settlement surrendered without resistance. Cartwright took the same precautions as at Albany to conciliate the residents and left the local Dutch officials to continue in power. A garrison of regular soldiers was placed in charge of the fort under the command of Captain Daniel Brodhead of the grenadiers. Brodhead and his wife settled in the area; his grandson, Daniel Brodhead II, founded Dansbury, Pennsylvania.

=== Capture of New Amstel ===
Around the same time that Nicolls sent Cartwright north to Fort Orange, he dispatched Sir Robert Carr, a relative of the Earl of Arlington, south to the territory the Dutch had previously seized from Sweden. The English took Fort Altena peacefully. Alexander D’Hinoyossa director of New Amstel retreated with some followers to Fort Casimir. Carr fired two broadsides into the fort, then took it by storm. His soldiers then pillaged the surrounding settlements, even though the residents had made no resistance. He seized property, harvests, some 200 sheep, horses, and cows, destroyed a brewery, and a sawmill. He then proceeded further south and plundered Pieter Corneliszoon Plockhoy's Mennonite settlement near present day Lewes, Delaware.

== Aftermath ==
Carr handed over Dutch soldiers to the merchantman as payment for services rendered and they were subsequently transported to Virginia to be sold.

Carr's behavior angered Nicolls, whose policy had been to avoid conflict between the settlers and the new government. He was also outraged that Carr looked to profit from his excesses while the soldiers were in need. He visited New Amstel, renamed it New Castle, and appointed a new commander, but was unable to compel Carr to give up any of his spoils, and returned to New York without him.

The Peace of Breda that ended the Second Anglo-Dutch War left New York in English hands. But on 9 August 1673 (N.S.), during the Third Anglo-Dutch War, a Dutch naval squadron under the joint command of Cornelis Evertsen the Youngest and Jacob Binckes retook New York in the Reconquest of New Netherland and the Dutch held on to the colony under governor Anthony Colve for more than a year, until they exchanged it for the colony of Suriname under the Treaty of Westminster (1674).
