= Carrie Sun =

American writer

Carrie Sun is a Chinese-born American writer. She is most known for her memoir Private Equity, in which she documents her experience working in the early 2010s as a personal assistant for Chase Coleman III, the founder of Tiger Global Management.

== Early life and education ==
Sun emigrated from China in 1990. She has a dual degree in mathematics and finance from Massachusetts Institute of Technology, and graduated early. She enrolled in a dual degree Master of Business Administration and Master of Arts program at the Wharton School and Lauder Institute at University of Pennsylvania but dropped out before completing the degrees.

In December 2020, she married Christopher Cerrone, a Pulitzer Prize finalist musical composer.

== Career ==
Sun has worked as an analyst at Fidelity Investments and Two Sigma. Eventually, she worked at Tiger Global as an assistant to the company's billionaire founder Chase Coleman.

In February 2024, Sun published Private Equity as a criticism to workplace culture, writing about mental and physical health, leading to occupational burnout.

== Publications ==
Year	Name	Publisher	ISBN
2024	Private Equity: A Memoir		ISBN 978-05-93654-99-6
