= Articles of Surrender of New Netherland =

1664 surrender document

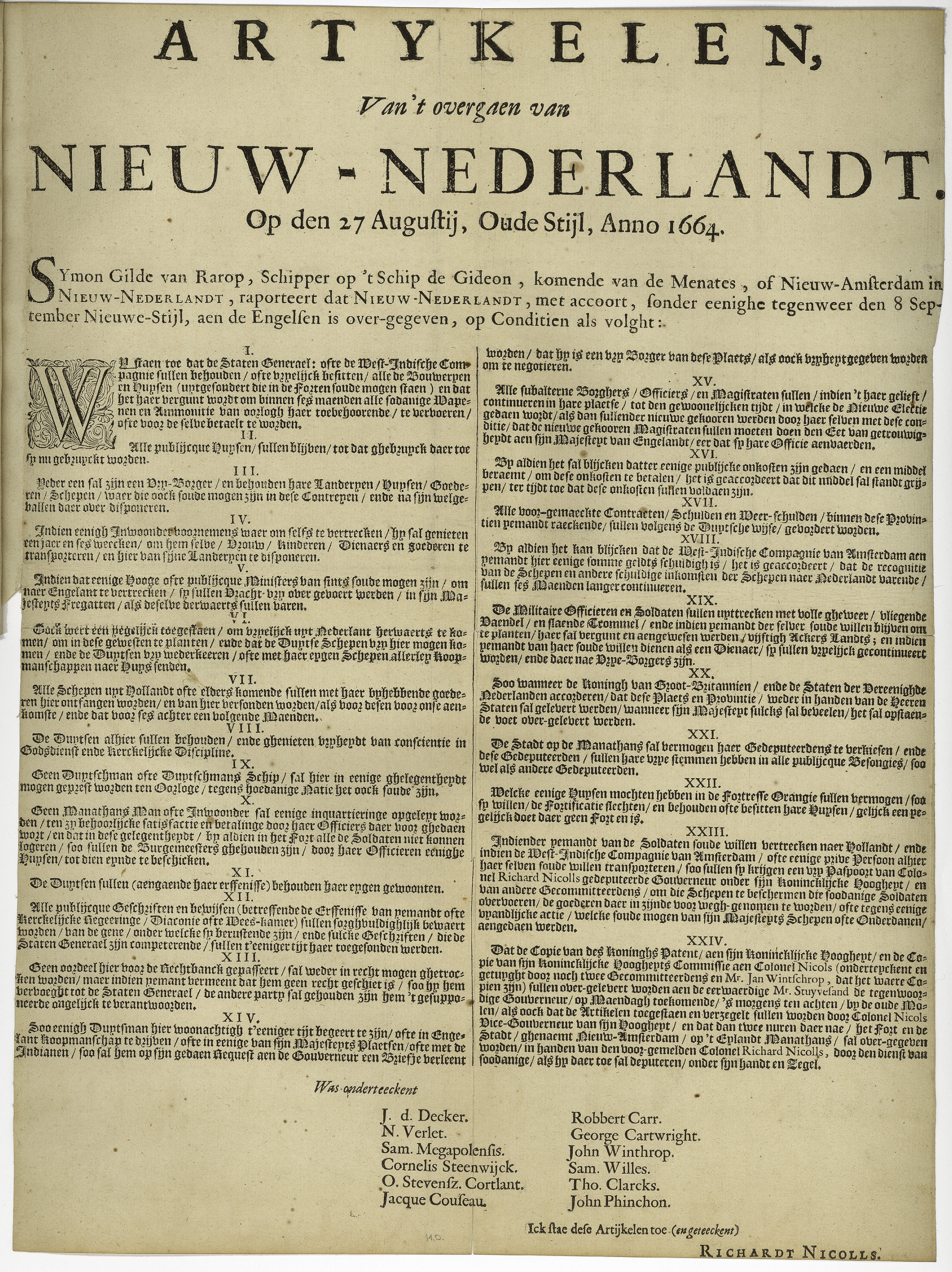
Articles about the transfer of New Netherland on the 27th of August, Old Style, Anno 1664

The Articles of Capitulation on the Reduction of New Netherland was a document of surrender signed on September 29, 1664, handing control of the Dutch Republic's colonial province New Netherland to the Kingdom of England.

Director-General Peter Stuyvesant conceded two days later to the capture of New Amsterdam by Richard Nicolls, who would become the first Governor of the Province of New York.

The lead negotiator for the Dutch side was Stuyvesant's lawyer Johannes de Decker. Negotiated at Stuyvesant Farm, the articles of surrender were signed by De Decker on an English ship in the harbor. De Decker negotiated the articles of surrender which included many legal rights and freedoms for residents of the province, as a sort of bill of rights. Many of these legal rights were later included in the Declaration of Independence and the American constitution.

There were 12 signatories: six representing the English and New England colonies and six representing the Council of New Netherland, the West India Company and New Netherlanders.

The terms were mostly adhered to by the English in the remainder of the conquest of New Netherland, with the notable exception of the mistreatment of Dutch prisoners of war at New Amstel.

== Signatories ==
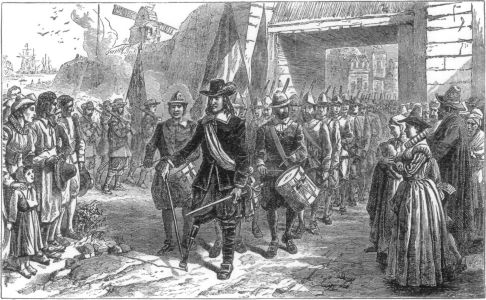
The capitulation of Peter Stuyvesant in New Amsterdam (by Charles Hemstreet)

English side:

- Sir Robert Carr (officer)
- George Cartwright (officer)
- John Winthrop (Connecticut)
- Samuel Willys, (Connecticut)
- Thomas Clarke (Massachusetts)
- John Pincheon (Massachusetts)

Dutch side:

- Johannes de Decker (Council of New Netherland)
- Nicholas Verleet (Council of New Netherland for trade)
- Samuel Megapolensis (Council of New Netherland, med. doc.)
- Cornelius Steenwyk (burgomaster)
- Oloff Stevens van Cortlandt (old burgomaster)
- James Cousseau (schepen).

== Text ==
l. September 29, 1664. Whereupon the Citty and Fort Amsterdam and Province of the New Netherlands were surrendered under His Most Exct. Mat’s. Obedience, made and concluded the 27th. day of September 1664. by the underwritten Commrs. of Richard Nichols Esqr Deputy Gov.r of His Royal Highness the Duke of York and Peter Stuyvesant in the name of the Estates Generalls of the United Belgick Provinces and West India Company Govern.r of the sd Town and ffort and Generall of that Province and in that quality ratified, and by their subscription confirmed the 29th day of the above Month and year.

Wee consent that the States Generall, or the West India Company shall freely enjoy all ffarms & Houses (except such as are in the fforts) and that within six months they shall have free Liberty to transport, all such arms and ammunition as now do belong to them, or else they shall be payd for them.

2. All publick Houses shall continue for the uses, wch. now they are for.

3. All people shall continue free Denizons and enjoy their Lands, Houses, Goods, Ships, wherever they are within this Country, and dispose of them as they please.

4. If any Inhabitant have a mind to remove himself he shall have a year and six weeks from this day to remove himself, Wife, Children, Servts. Goods [2] and to dispose of his Land here.

5. If any officer of State of publick Minister of State have a mind to go for England they shall be transported fraught free in His Ma.t’s ffriggatts, when those ffriggats shall returne thither.

6. It is consented to, that any people may freely come from the Netherlands and plant in this Country; and that Dutch Vessells may freely come hither, and any of the Dutch may freely return home, or send any sort of Netherlanders home in Vessells of their own Country.

7. All ships from the Netherlands or any other places, and goods therin, shall be received here & sent hence, after the manner, wch. Formerly they were before our coming hither for six months next ensuing.

8. The Dutch here shall enjoy their Liberty of their Consciences in Divine Worship and Church Dissipline.

9. No Dutchman here or Dutch Ships here shall upon any occasion be prest to serve in Warr against any Nation whatsoever.

10. That the Townesman of the Manhattan shall not have any Soldiers quartered upon them wth.out being satisfied and payd for them, by their officers, and that at this present, if the ffort be not capable of lodging all the Soldiers, then the Burge Master by His officers shall appoint some House capable to [reward] them. [3]

11. The Dutch here shall enjoy their own Customs concerning their Inheritances.

12. All publick writings and Records wch. Concerns the Inheritances of any people, or the Regulment of the Church or Poor or Orphans shall bee carefully kept by them in whose hands now they are, and such writings as particularly concern the states generall all may att any time be sent to them.

13. No Judgement that hath passed any Judicature here shall be called in question, but if any conceive that he hath not had Justice done him, if hee apply himself to the states Generall, the other party shall bee bound to answer for the supposed Injury.

14. If any Dutch living here shall att any time desire to travell or traffique into England or any place or Plantation in obedience to His Maty of England, or with the Indians he shall have (upon his Request to the Govr.) a Certificate that he is a free Denizon of this Place, and Liberty to do so.

15. If itt do appear that there is a publick ingagement of Debt by the Town of Manhatons, and a way agreed on for the satisfying of gt engagement. [4] It is agreed that the same proposed shall goon and that the engagement shall bee satisfied.

16. All inferior Civill officers and Magistrated shall contrive as now they are (if they please) till the customary time of new Elections; and then new ones to be chosen by themselves Provided that such new ones Magistrates shall take the Oath of Allegiance to His Maty of England before they enter upon their Office.

17. All Differences of Contracts and Bargains made before this day by any in this Country shall bee determined according to the manner of the Dutch.

18. If it do appear that the west India Company of Amsterdam do really ow any Summs of mony to any persons here, itt is agreed that Recognition and other Duties payable by Ships going for the Motherlands, bee continued for six months longer.

19. The officers Military & Soldiers shall march out with their Armes, Drums Bating and Colours flying, and lighted matches; and if any of them will plant they shall have fifty acres of land sett out for them; if any of them will serve any as Servants they shall continue with all safety and become free Denizons afterwards.

20. If at any time hereafter the King of Great Britaine and the States of the Motherlands do agree that this place and Country be redelivered into the hands of the said States whensoever His Maty will send His Commands to redeliver itt, itt shall immediately be done.

21. That the Town of Manhatons shall choose Deputies and those Deputies shall have free vogues in all publick affairs as much as any other Deputies.

22. Those who have any propriety in any Houses in the ffort of [aurania] shall (if they please) slight the ffortifications there, and then enjoy all their houses as all people do where there is no ffort.

23. If there be any Soldiers that will go into Holland and if the Company of West India in Amsterdam, or any private persons here will transport them into Holland, then they shall have a sage Passport from Coll Richard Nicholls Deputy Governr. under His Royall Highness, and the other Comm.rs to defend the ship that shall transport such Soldiers, and all the goods in them from any surprizall or Acts of Hostility to be done by any of His Ma.t’s Ships or Subjects.

That the Coppy of the Kings grant to His Royall Highness, and the Coppy of His Royall Highness Commission to Coll Nicholls testified by two Comm.rs now and Mr. Winthrop to be true Coppies shall be delivered to the Honble Mr. Stuyvesant the present Governr. on Munday next by sight of [6] the Clock in the morning at the old Milne and these Articles consented to, and signed by Coll Richd. Nicholls Depty Governr. to His Royall Highness, and that within two hours after the ffort and Town called New Amsterdam upon the Isle of Manhatons, shall be delivered into the hands of the sd Coll Richard Nicholls by the Service of such as shall be by him thereunto deputed by his hand and seal. I give my consent to those articles

Richard Nicholls.

== See also ==
- Flushing Remonstrance
