= Sean Solme Kim =

South Korean-American executive

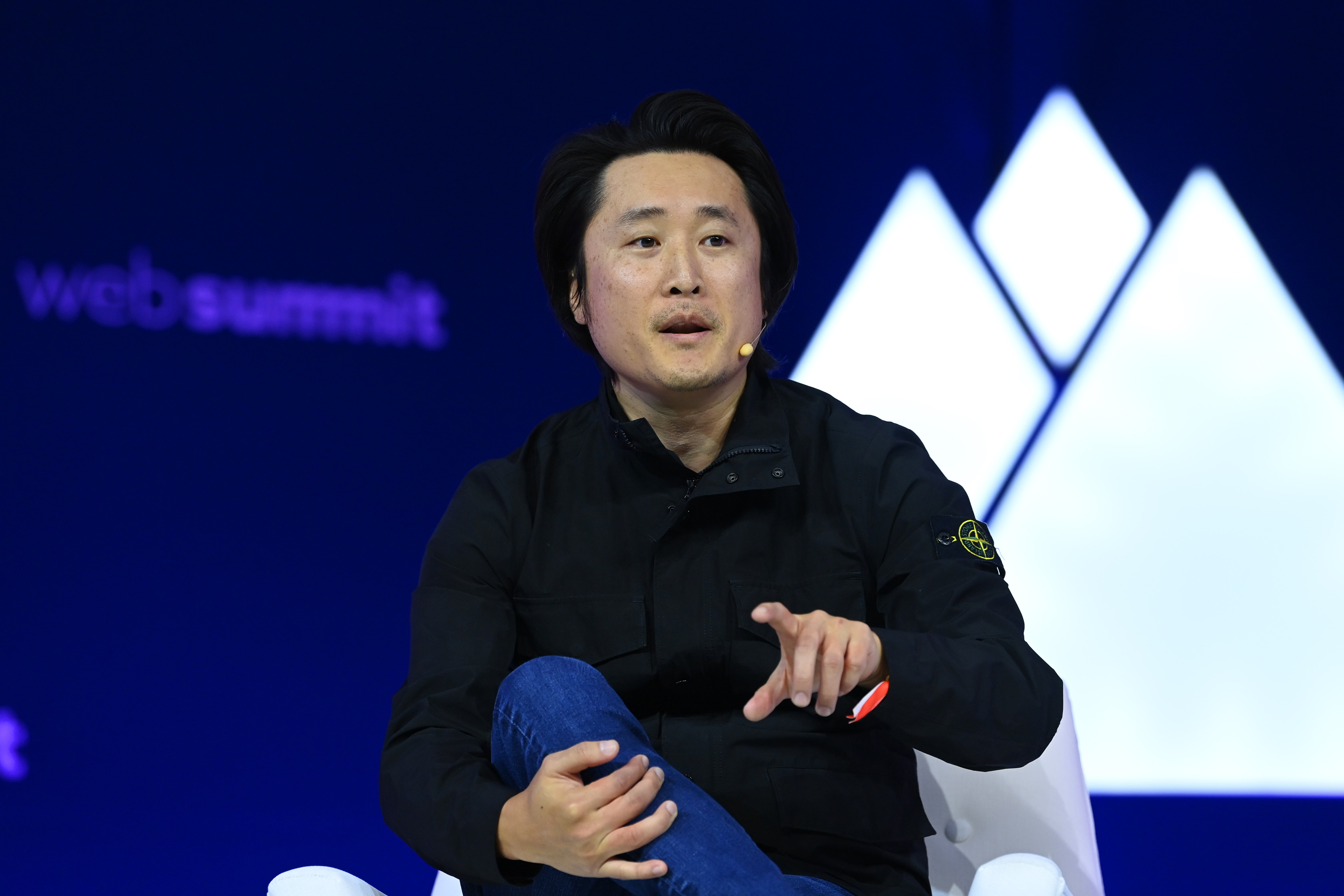
- Born: Kim Solme; May 23, 1979 (age 46); Daegu, South Korea
- Education: Bachelor in Mathematics from the University of Texas in 2004
- Occupations: Tech executive

Sean Solme Kim (born September 23, 1979) is a South Korean-American executive. He is best known for his role as head of product at TikTok US. Kim was also an executive at Amazon. Additionally, he was president and chief product officer at Kajabi.

== Early life and education ==
Kim was born on September 23, 1979, in Daegu, South Korea. He completed his bachelor's in mathematics from the University of Texas in 2004.

== Career ==
Kim worked as the senior manager for product and marketing at DirecTV from February 2011 to March 2014.

In March 2014, Kim joined Amazon as the senior marketing manager for Amazon Devices. In March 2016, he joined Amazon Prime as a senior product manager and was later promoted to global head of product for retention.

Kim left Amazon in September 2019 and joined TikTok US as the head of products where he set the strategic direction and led teams responsible for developing and growing the company's product. Kim's responsibilities included For You Page (FYP), Creator Monetization, TikTok for Developers, TikTok on new devices (TV, Echo, Tesla), 3rd party integrations, AR Effect House, TikTok for Good, Kids app, Privacy, Account Security and Integrity, and the Webapp.

During the COVID-19 pandemic, Kim has worked on various projects, including live streams with the World Health Organization and other medical personnel, and distributing donation stickers supporting organizations such as Meals on Wheels and the Actors’ Fund.

In February 2022, Kim left TikTok and joined Kajabi as the president and chief product officer, a technology company based in Irvine, California.

In January 2024, Kim joined Vault Comics as an advisor and provides strategic guidance for projects. In November 2024, Kim was hired as chief executive officer of Triller, a media and marketing company.. Kim left Triller in July 2025.
