= Scott Shleifer =

American hedge fund manager

- Born: Scott Louis Shleifer; 1976 or 1977 (age 48–49); Portland, Oregon, US
- Education: University of Pennsylvania
- Occupation: Hedge fund manager
- Known for: co-founder of Tiger Global Management's private equity arm
- Spouse: Elena Shleifer
- Children: 4

Scott Louis Shleifer (born 1977) is an American billionaire hedge fund manager, and the co-founder of Tiger Global Management's private equity investing business. As of March 2026, his net worth was estimated at US$3.8 billion.

== Early life ==
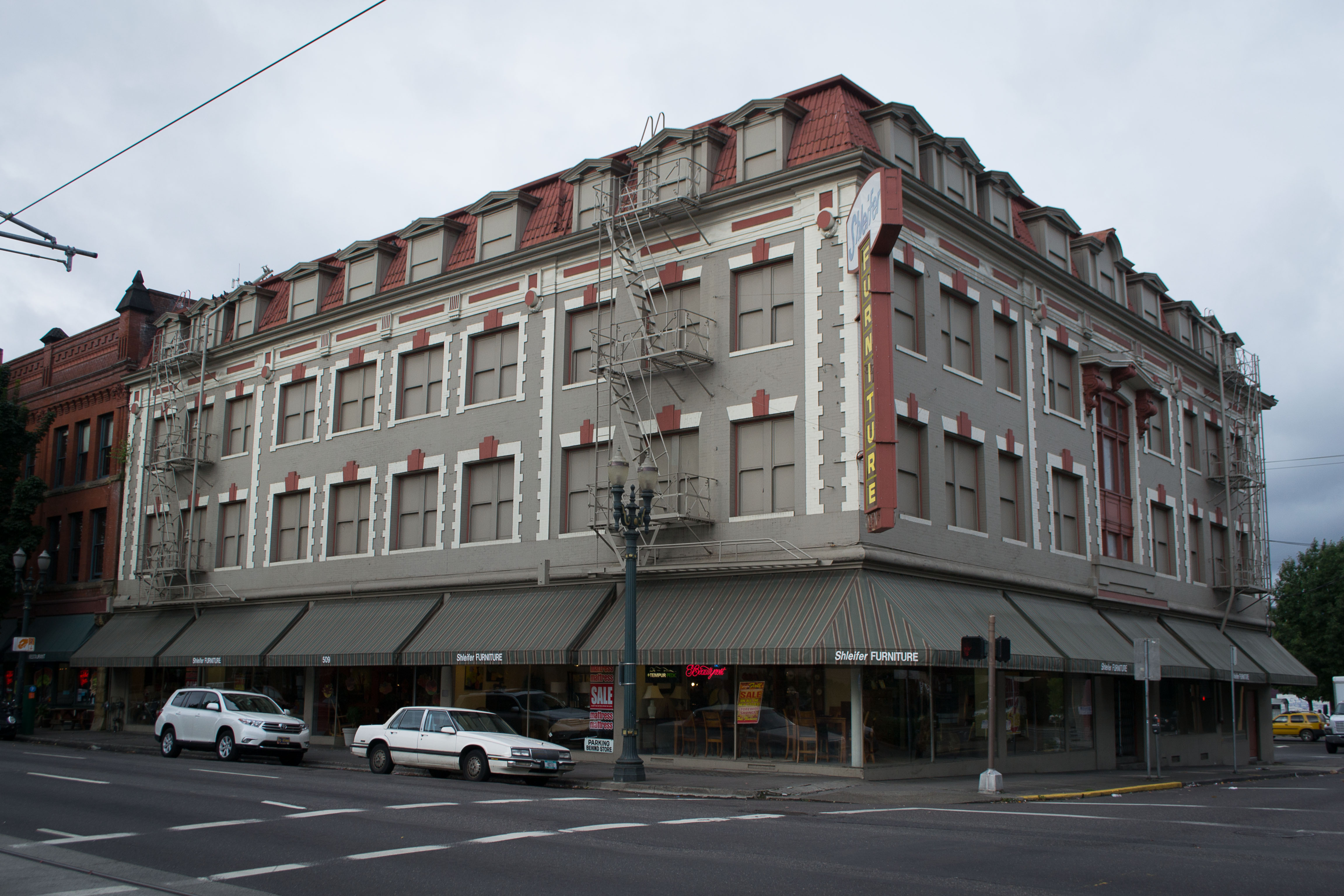
Shleifer Furniture building at 509 S.E. Grand Ave, Portland, Oregon, 2013

Shleifer was born and raised in suburban Portland, Oregon. His father, Stuart Shleifer, ran Shleifer Furniture, the family business, until it closed. The company was founded in 1936 by Stuart Shleifer's father and grandfather, and the Shleifer Furniture building was originally the Chamberlin Hotel. The store closed in 2015, and was sold (along with a 15,000-square-foot warehouse) to Brad Malsin, head of Beam Development who plans to turn the 45,000-square-foot building back into a hotel. According to Scott, "My father sold couches for a living." He is of Jewish descent.

Shleifer graduated from Beaverton High School in 1995, and in 2021 donated $1.8 million to the school.

Shleifer earned a bachelor's degree from the University of Pennsylvania's Wharton School in 1999.

== Career ==
After college, he worked as an analyst at Blackstone for three years. In 2003, Shleifer co-founded Tiger Global Management's private equity investing business. He moved Tiger Global into venture capital, especially in China, and expanded aggressively.

In 2019, he was included in Wharton magazine's "40 under 40" list, and said his no 1 role model is Julian Robertson. He is managing director and a partner at Tiger Global Management.

In November 2023, Shleifer stepped down from his leadership role at Tiger Global and became a senior advisor.

== Personal life ==
Shleifer has been married to Elena since at least 2011, and they live in New York City. They have four children. In February 2021, he purchased a 21,000-square-foot mansion in Palm Beach, Florida for $122.7 million. He reportedly only looked at the house for 15 minutes before deciding to buy it. It was the second-most expensive home in the US when it was purchased by Shleifer.

In January 2022, Scott and Elena Shleifer gave $18 million to the University of Pennsylvania.
