= Blank Street Coffee =

American coffee shop chain

Blank Street Inc.
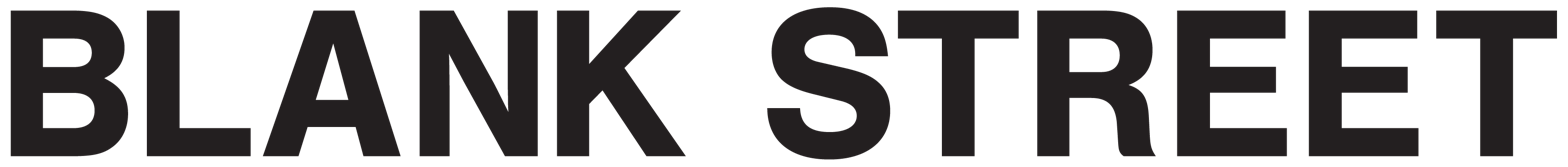

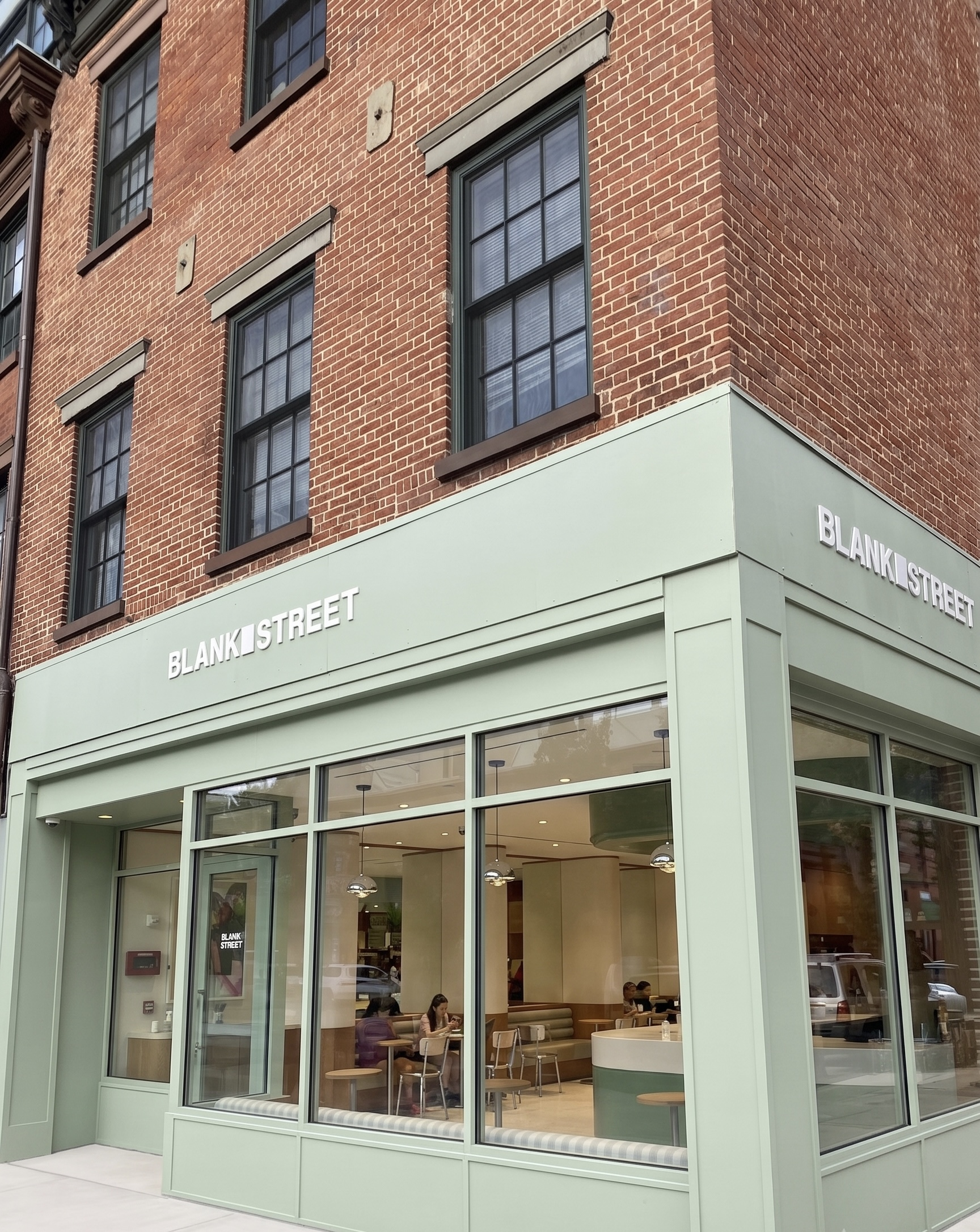
- Storefront in New York City
- Type: Private
- Industry: Retail coffee
- Founded: 2020; 6 years ago
- Founders: Vinay Menda, Issam Freiha & Ignacio Llado
- Headquarters: Brooklyn, New York, U.S.
- Number of employees: ~1,300
- Website: www.blankstreet.com

Blank Street is an American coffeehouse chain founded in 2020, in Williamsburg, Brooklyn, New York City, United States. As of July 2025, the company is valued at approximately $500 million and operates 90 locations in the United States and United Kingdom.

Blank Street is best known for its flavored variations of matcha and espresso drinks.

== History ==
Blank Street was established in May 2020. The company launched in August 2020 with a location near Wythe Diner in Brooklyn. Founders Issam Freiha and Vinay Menda began selling coffee out of their battery-powered mobile coffee cart, in partnership with EV Foods and industry team Jai Lott and Laura Simpson. Menda from the UAE and Freiha from Lebanon, the two came to New York to study at NYU and Columbia respectively.

The pair claim inspiration from small-format, and mobile-first food retail businesses in Asia, such as Hey Tea in China and Kopi Kenangan in Indonesia. However, in February 2021 Blank Street opened its first static location on Bedford Avenue in Williamsburg. In October 2021, the chain obtained $25 million in Series A round venture capital funding. Overall, it raised $67 million in 2021, with investors such as General Catalyst and Tiger Global.

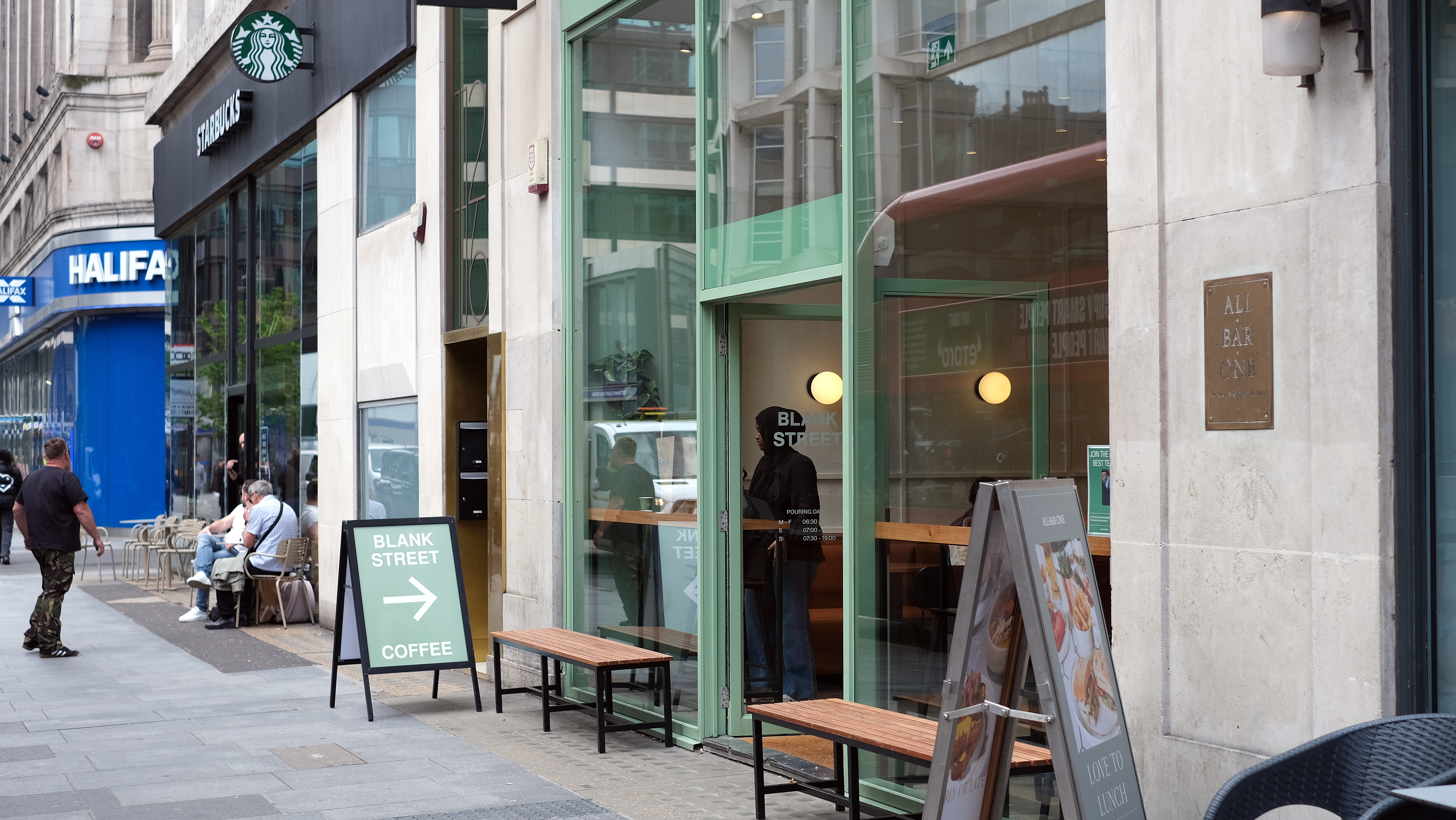
Location on New Oxford Street, London

The chain continued to expand in 2022, opening its first location overseas in March, in the Fitzrovia district of London. By August, Blank Street had opened 40 locations across Brooklyn and Manhattan. It also expanded into further US locations, with its first Boston outlet opening in Beacon Hill in August, and a Washington, D.C. location at Dupont Circle following in October.

In early 2025, the chain opened stores across Edinburgh and Glasgow, Scotland. As of April 2026, the company operates 40 stores in the UK. By July 2025, the company was valued at $500 million.

In April 2026, the Financial Times reported that the company was in talks to raise more than $100 million, with a valuation possibly exceeding $1 billion.

== Identity ==
Blank Street is considered a competitor to Starbucks in the U.S. and UK, as well as to Dunkin' Donuts in Boston.

Writer Li Goldstein attributed its success to partnerships with "it-girl" social media influencers, including brands owned by Kendall Jenner and Emma Chamberlain.

The Wall Street Journal attributed the chain's success to its matcha options, accounting for approximately 50% of business. It also highlighted the high sugar content of drinks, up to 25 grams, as the daily limit for women suggested by the American Heart Association, as well as the chain's reliance on teenage customers.
