= Stuyvesant Farm =

Farm in New Amsterdam

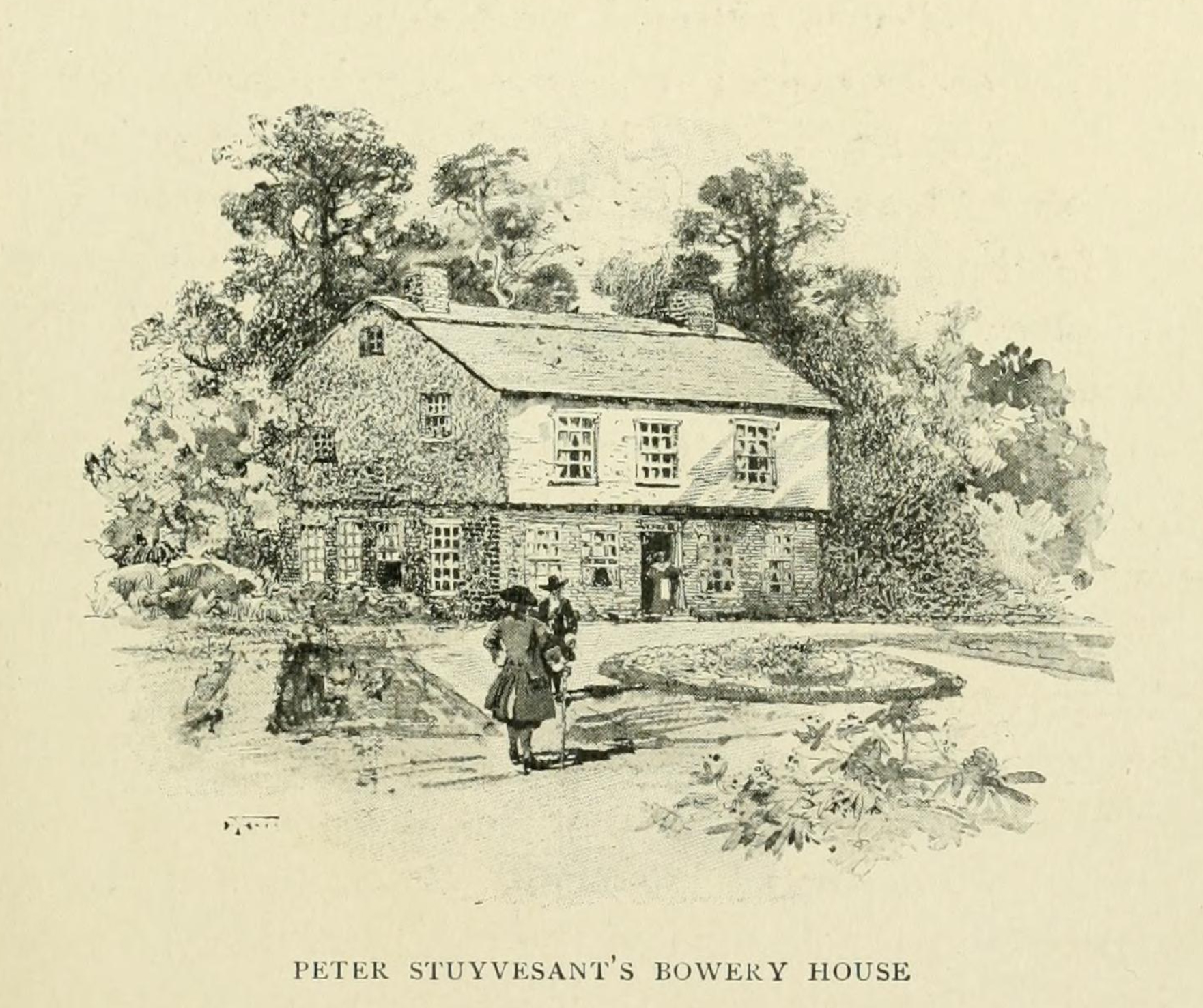
Peter Stuyvesant's house on the Great Bowery

Stuyvesant Farm, also known as the Great Bowery, was the estate of Peter Stuyvesant, the last Dutch director-general of the colony of New Netherland, as well as his predecessors and later his familial descendants. The land was at first designated Bowery No. 1, the largest and northernmost of six initial estates of the Dutch West India Company north of New Amsterdam, used as the official residence and economic support for Willem Verhulst and all subsequent directors of the colony.

In 1651, while serving as director, Stuyvesant purchased the land from the company. He capitulated the colony to the English in 1664 and went to Europe for three years, returning to retire to his farm in 1667. The land was kept in the Stuyvesant family for many generations into the American period, and was the namesake of numerous local sites and institutions.

== History ==
=== Before Stuyvesant ===
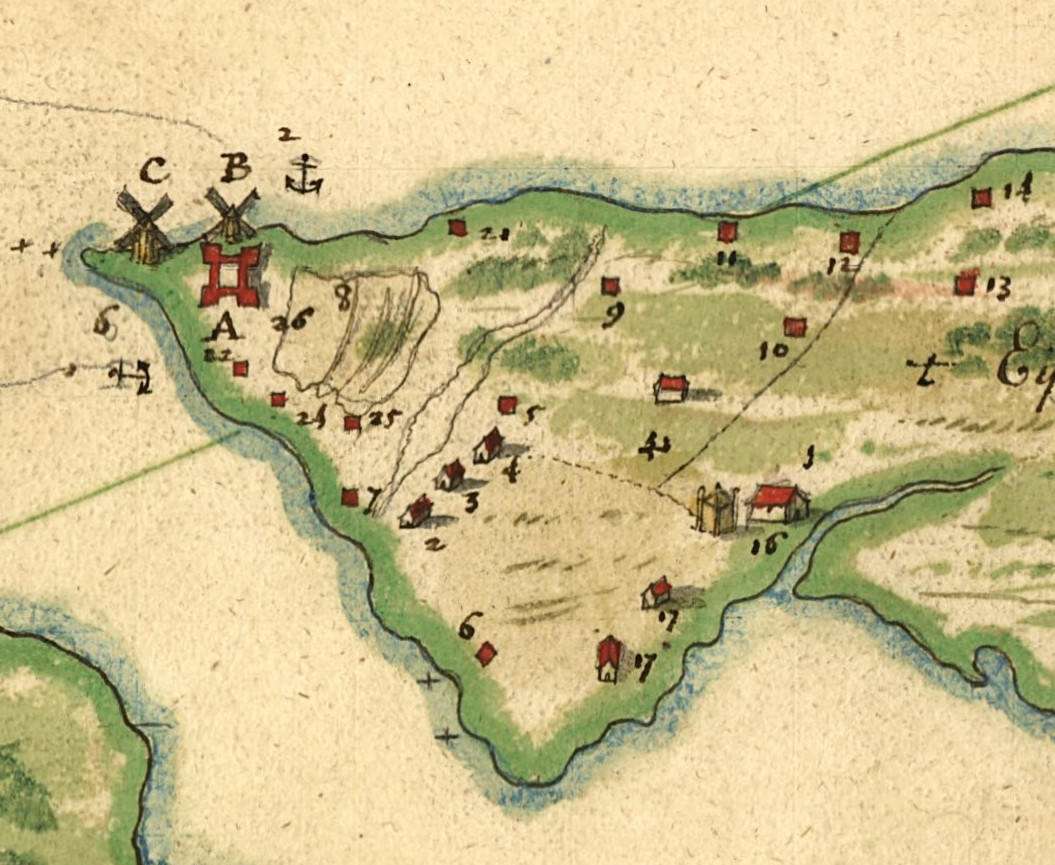
Manatus Map of 1639 under Willem Kieft (north to right)

1 / Bowery No. 1	Fort Amsterdam

Prior to Dutch colonization, the land where Stuyvesant Farm sat was most likely used or inhabited by Native Americans. The Wappinger and Lenape peoples inhabited Manhattan, using the land as seasonal hunting grounds and also establishing permanent villages there. The Dutch Republic formed the colony of New Netherland in the early 17th century, and Cryn Fredericks of the Dutch West India Company set out six estates north of New Amsterdam to be farmed to support the commanding officers of the colony. The land which made up Stuyvesant Farm was formerly part of two of these estates, the entire Bowery No. 1 and parts of Bowery No. 2 (bowery is an anglicization of the archaic Dutch word for "farm", spelled bouwerie or bouwerij). These boweries were laid out along a Native American footpath, part of the Northeastern Great Trail and later the Boston Post Road, that would become known as the Bowery Lane after its destination at the Great Bowery.

In 1632, Wouter van Twiller took control of Bowery No. 1 when he became Director of New Netherland. During his stewardship over the farm he oversaw many improvements, including adding a house, a brewery, and barns. The largely self-sufficient farm's primary product is thought to have been the staple wheat, rather than a cash crop like tobacco. The building that would become Stuyvesant's Bowery Mansion was most likely a structure originally erected by the Dutch West India Company's carpenters in 1633. Van Twiller was fired in 1637 and when his replacement, Willem Kieft, arrived in 1638, he found the colony in disarray outside of the impressive Bowery No.1. The Manatus Map of 1639 indicates only half of the six company boweries were in operation, referring to Boweries 2–6 as “five run down bouweries of the Company, which stand idle whereof now, [in] 1639, 3 are again occupied.”

=== Under Stuyvesant ===
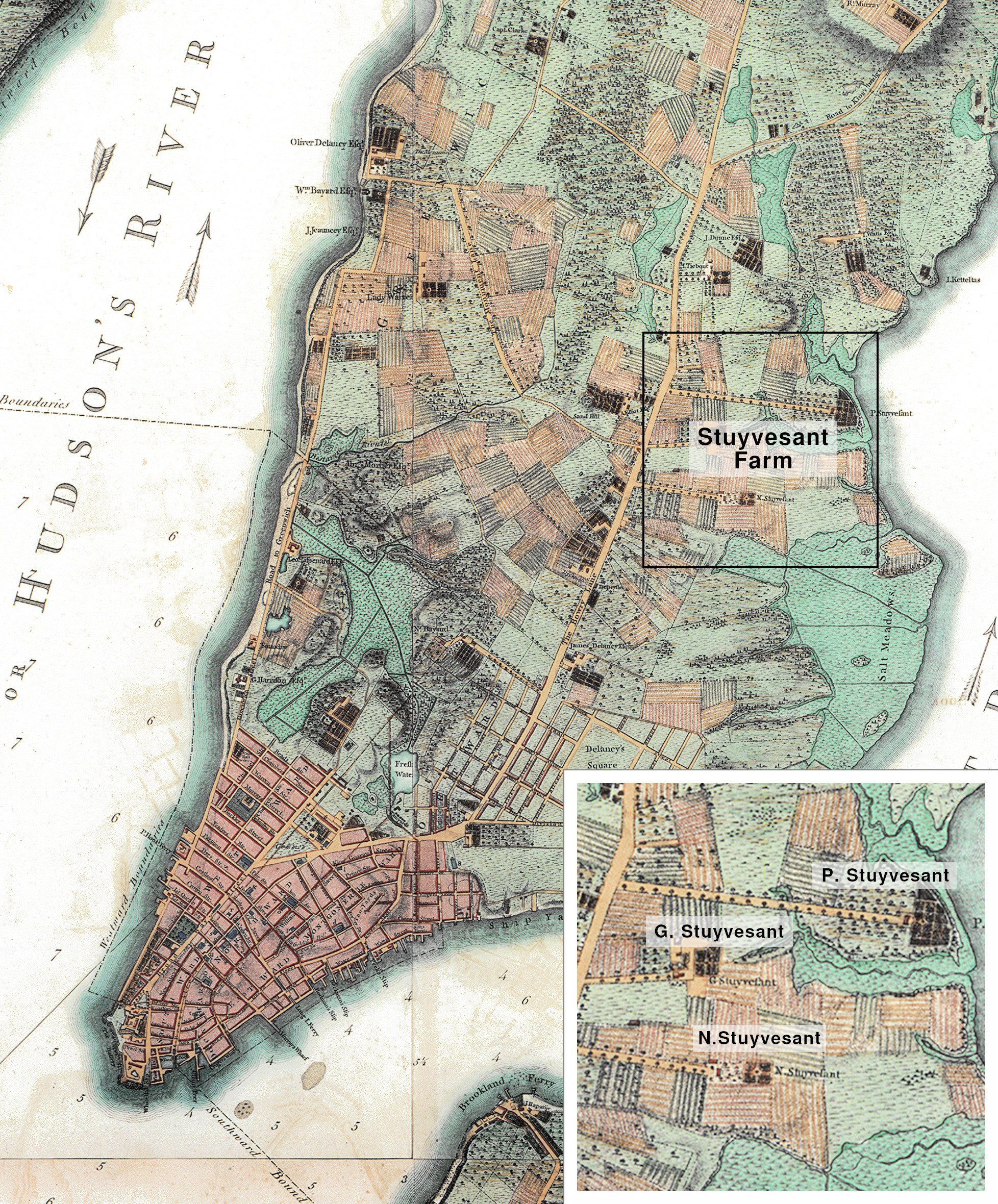
Insert of "The Plan of the City of New York in North America" by British military officer Bernard Ratzer, surveyed in 1766 and 1767, printed in 1770

In 1645, Peter Stuyvesant was selected to replace Kieft as Director of New Netherland, and took on the role in 1647. On March 12, 1651, the company directors in Amsterdam authorized the sale of the farm with its dwelling house, barns, woods, six cows, two horses and two African slaves for ƒ6,400 to Stuyvesant, acting through his agent Jan Jansen Damen. By the mid-17th century, an estimated 40 people were enslaved on Stuyvesant Farm. Stuyvesant was the largest private slaveholder on Manhattan; only the company of which he was director held more. Stuyvesant diminished free African-owned properties in the neighboring Land of the Blacks settlement by appropriating some of them to himself, through both purchases and fiat, though most stayed intact.

When England moved to take over New Netherland in 1664, a delegation of twelve met at Stuyvesant Farm to negotiate the Articles of Surrender of New Netherland, and papers were later signed by Johannes de Decker on an English ship in the harbor. Terms were generous enough that Stuyvesant kept his estate and lived the rest of his life there, after a three-year trip back to the Netherlands until the Peace of Breda.

=== After Stuyvesant ===
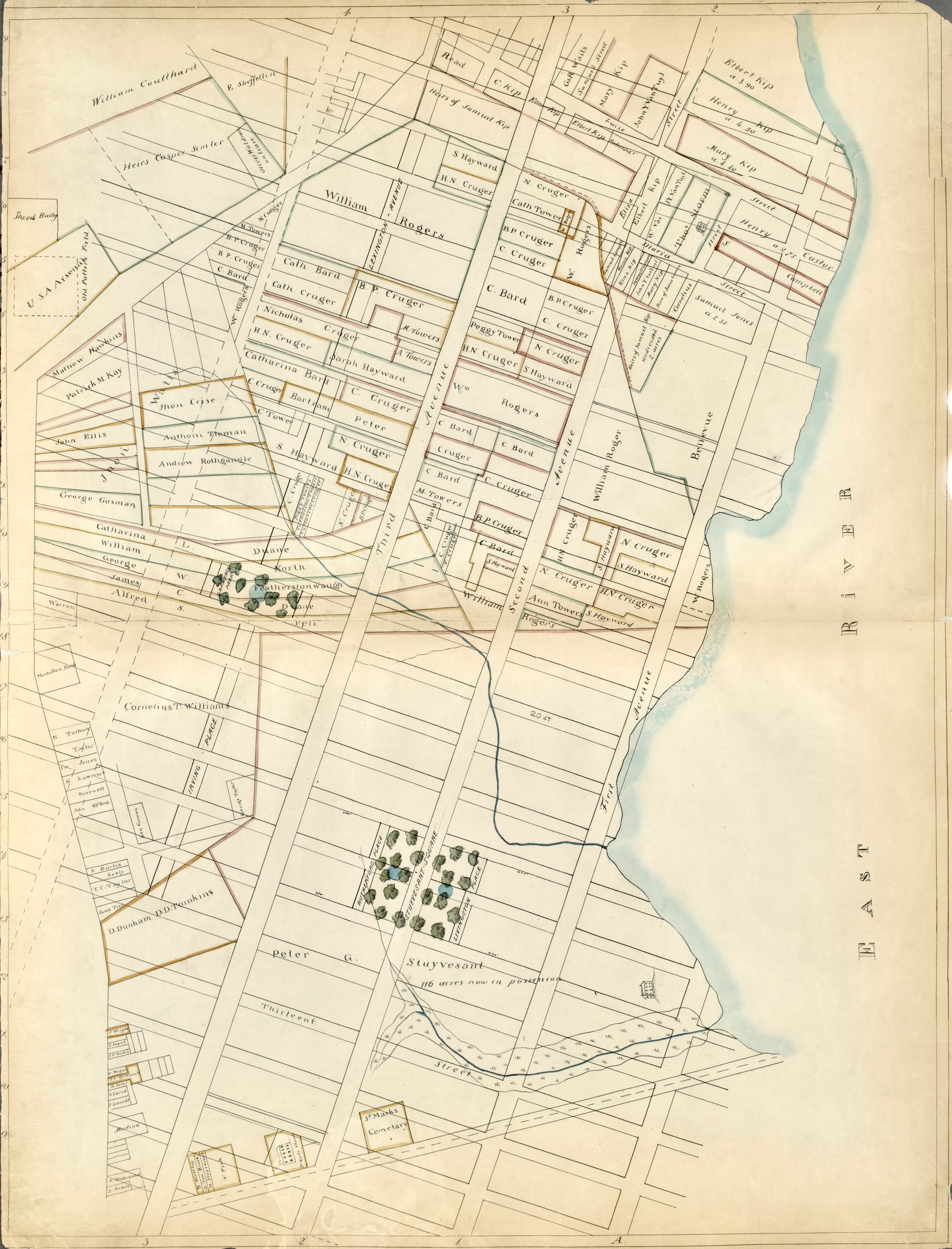
Map of Manhattan from Maps of Farms Commonly Called the Blue Book by Otto Sackersdorff, updated in 1868

The property was inherited in Stuyvesant family, sometimes with new land acquisitions. The family continued to hold slaves into the early 19th century. The family land area gradually declined into the 19th century as pieces were sold off, both commercially and in some cases to local institutions for a nominal price. The tract of land that comprised Stuyvesant Farm covered what is today's East Village and Stuyvesant Town.

== Timeline ==
- 1625 Six Company Bouweries surveyed, Willem Verhulst controls Bouwerie No. 1
- 1626 Peter Minuit controls Bouwerie No. 1
- 1632 Sebastiaen Jansen Krol controls Bouwerie No. 1
- 1633 Wouter van Twiller controls Bouwerie No. 1
- 1638 Willem Kieft controls Bouwerie No. 1, and continues to lease it to Van Twiller
- 1647 Peter Stuyvesant controls Bouwerie No. 1, Original pear tree planted
- 1651 Peter Stuyvesant purchases outright
- 1660 Stuyvesant family chapel
- 1664 Dutch surrender negotiated at Bouwerie House, Peter Stuyvesant departs
- 1667 Peter Stuyvesant returns and retires to farm
- 1778 Bouwerie House burns down
- 1787 Stuyvesant Street laid out
- 1793, 1795–1799 Stuyvesant family chapel land sold, St. Mark's Church in-the-Bowery built
- 1811 Commissioners' Plan of 1811 laid out streets through all of Manhattan above Houston Street to 155th Street including the land once belonging to Stuyvesant Farm
- 1829, 1834 Peter Gerard Stuyvesant sells Stuyvesant Meadows, becomes land for Tompkins Square Park
- 1836 Peter Gerard Stuyvesant sells land for Stuyvesant Square
- 1847 Stuyvesant Square fence built
- 1867 Original pear tree toppled following a storm
- 1969, 1974 St. Mark's Historic District designated by New York City Landmarks Preservation Commission and added to National Register of Historic Places
- 2003 New pear tree planted

== Relevant sites ==
Stuyvesant Square and Tompkins Square Park are both within the limits of the Stuyvesant farm.

=== Residences ===
The Bouwerie House was a manor house perhaps originally built for Van Twiller, that became the personal property of Stuyvesant and later of his family until it was burned on October 24, 1778. An informal settlement, known as Stuyvesant Village or Bowery Village, grew up adjoining the house to its west. The Bouwerie House is to be distinguished from the governor's house downtown at what became known as Whitehall Street.

Other residences of Stuyvesant family members in the area included Petersfield, a newer "Bowery House", 44 Stuyvesant Street, Hamilton Fish House, and 19 Gramercy Park South.

=== Waters ===
The estate included a wetland known as Stuyvesant Meadows, part of which was later filled and converted to form Tompkins Square Park. Two creeks, noted for their eel populations, passed through the wetland, Stuyvesant Creek and a feature later called Ninth Street Creek. Stuyvesant Creek also passed by the Bouwerie House and was used in winter for ice skating. The creeks emptied into the East River on Stuyvesant Cove, between Kip's Bay and Corlears Hook.

=== Stuyvesant Pear Tree ===
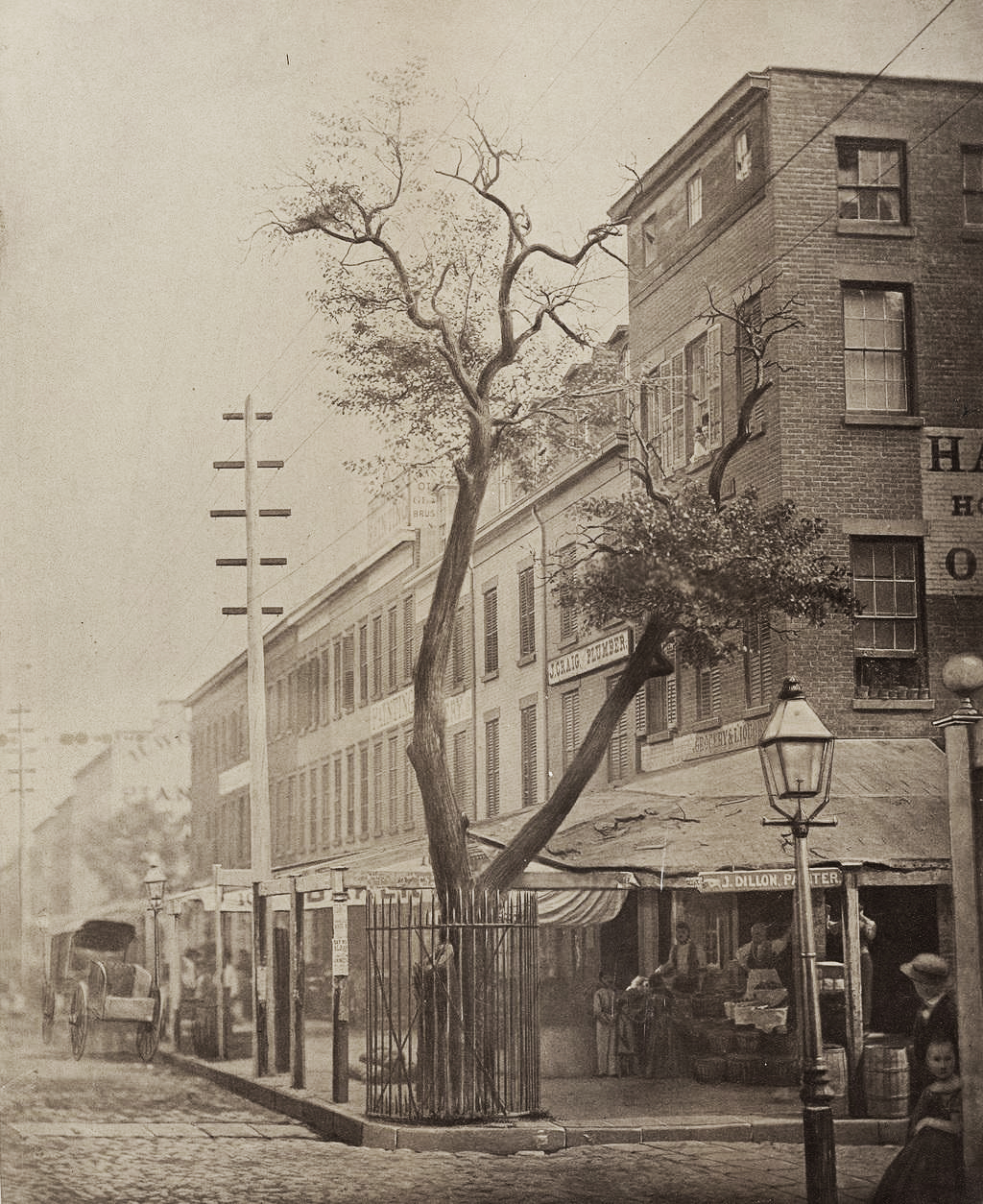
Stuyvesant pear tree, 1863

In 1647, Stuyvesant brought a pear tree from the Netherlands and planted it on his farm. The tree stood at the corner of Thirteenth Street and Third Avenue until 1867, where it lived for two hundred years, with New York City growing around it. The 1811 street grid covered over the farm but spared the Stuyvesant Pear Tree. The tree remained there, through the founding of Kiehl's Pharmacy at the same corner in 1851, until February 1867 when, weakened by a massive winter storm, it toppled by a wagon collision.

A plaque marking the Stuyvesant tree's spot remains at the corner of 13th Street and Third Avenue. In this neighborhood, pear trees are still planted to commemorate the original pear tree planted by Stuyvesant. A Stuyvesant descendant gifted a cross-section of the original trunk to the New-York Historical Society. Kiehl's planted a new pear tree at the same spot in 2003.

=== Modern namesakes ===
- The Bowery
- St. Mark's Church in-the-Bowery
- Stuyvesant Street
- Stuyvesant Square
- Stuyvesant Town–Peter Cooper Village
- Stuyvesant Cove Park
- Stuyvesant High School (original building)
