= Kajabi =

American marketing technology company

Kajabi LLC
- Type: Private
- Industry: Advertising and marketing
- Founded: 2010
- Founder: Kenny Rueter
- Headquarters: Newport Beach, CA, U.S.
- Key people: Ahad Khan, Chief Executive Officer and Chief Financial Officer; Kenny Rueter, Executive Chairman; Jonathan Cronstedt, President and Board Director
- Products: Kajabi SaaS platform for selling digital content
- Number of employees: 200 (2021)
- Website: kajabi.com

Kajabi LLC is a Newport Beach, CA-based SaaS technology company that develops a platform for creators and entrepreneurs to create, market and sell digital content. Recently Kajabi has expanded its focus to include support for online courses and app development. The company is a tech unicorn, with a $2 billion valuation.

The company was founded in 2010, and its CEO as of March 2022 is Ahad Khan.

== History ==
Kajabi was founded in Irvine, California in 2010 by Travis Rosser & Kenny Rueter, a software engineer who created a PVC sprinkler toy for his sons. The toy was popular, and after having difficulty trying to monetize a related how-to video on YouTube, Rueter started Kajabi. The company integrated various software that digital entrepreneurs needed to start online businesses.

In November 2019, the company took its first outside capital since its inception, a minority equity investment from Spectrum Equity Partners.

In 2021, Ahad Khan took over as CEO, and founder Rueter became executive chairman. In May 2021, the company raised a $550 million funding round at a $2 billion valuation, making it a tech unicorn. The funding round was led by Tiger Global, with participation from TPG Capital, Tidemark Capital, Owl Rock, Meritech Capital Partners, and Spectrum Equity. In July, the company added podcast hosting and marketing features for business owners. Also in 2021, the company was named to the Inc 5000 list of the fastest growing private companies in the United States for the 7th straight year. Also in 2021, the company launched a television advertising campaign "What Will You Create", created by Los Angeles-based production company Snow Beach.

In February 2022, former TikTok and Amazon executive Sean Solme Kim joined the company as president and chief product officer.

== Products ==
Kajabi develops an online subscription platform that allows members to build and manage websites to monetize digital offerings such as online courses, membership communities and podcasts. Its customers are part of the knowledge economy. Categories for which content is created include personal development, health and fitness, business finance, marketing, education, parenting and lifestyle hobbies. The platform includes marketing tools such as email, and payment processing tools to accept subscription fees.

== Operations ==
Kajabi is headquartered in Newport Beach, California. Its CEO is Ahad Khan. As of 2021, the company reported 200 employees.

As of February 2022, the company reported 51,000 active users in 138 countries. As of February 2025, Kajabi's users have earned over $9 billion in sales.
