= Peter Stuyvesant =

Dutch colonial administrator (1610–1672)

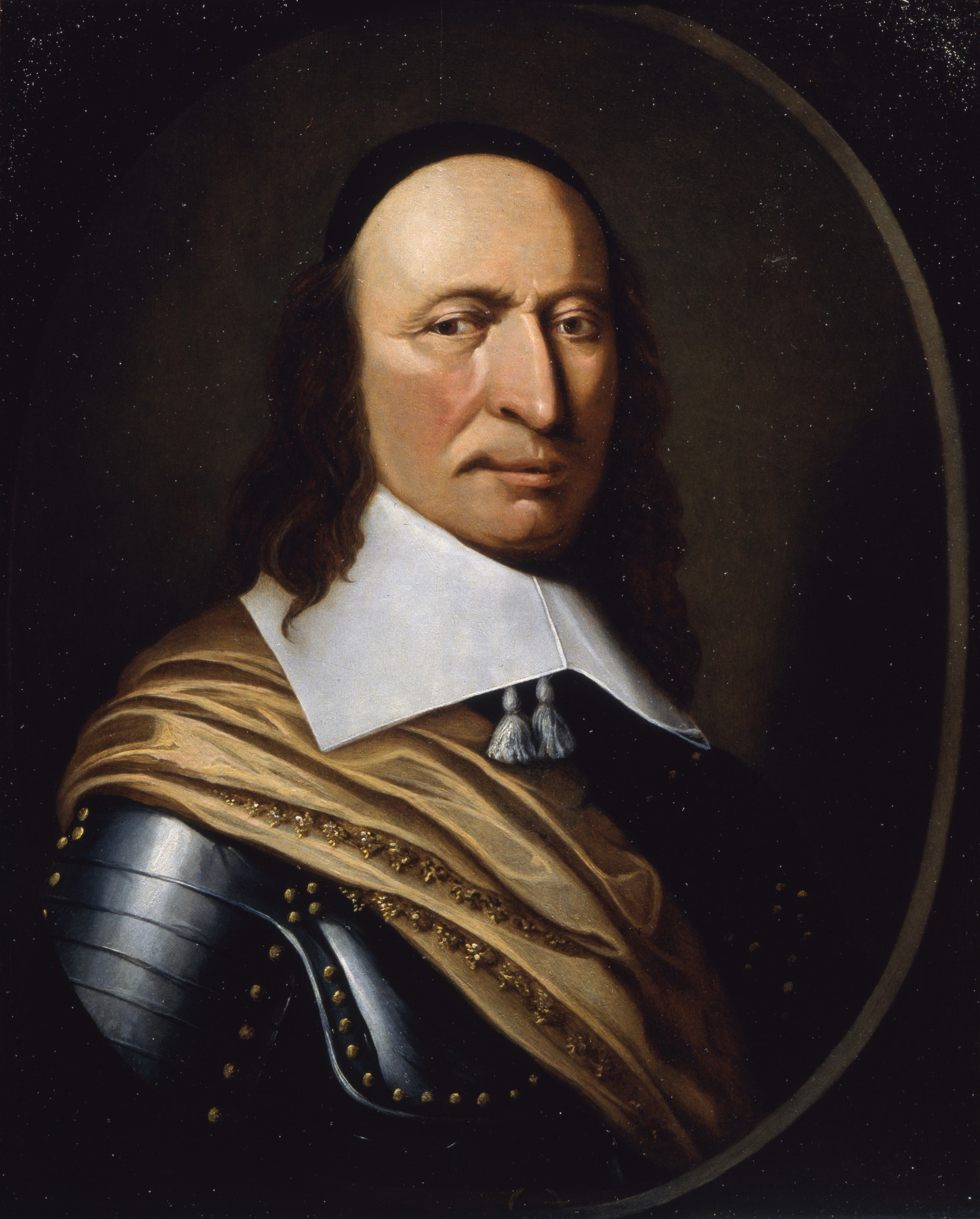
- Painting attributed to Hendrick Couturier c. 1660

Director-General of New Netherland
- In office 1647–1665
- Preceded by: Willem Kieft
- Succeeded by: Richard Nicolls (as Governor of New York)

Personal details
- Born: c. 1610 Peperga, Friesland, Dutch Republic
- Died: August 1672 (aged 61–62) Manhattan, Province of New York
- Resting place: St. Mark's Church in-the-Bowery
- Spouse: Judith Bayard (m. 1645)
- Relations: See Stuyvesant family
- Children: Balthasar Lazarus Stuyvesant; Nicolaes Willem Stuyvesant
- Parent(s): Balthazar Jansz Stuyvesant; Margaretha van Hardenstein

Stuyvesant Coat of Arms

Peter Stuyvesant (Note: In Dutch also Pieter, Petrus and Stuijvesant.) (c. 1610 – August 1672) was a Dutch colonial administrator who served as the director-general of New Netherland from 1647 to 1664, when the colony was provisionally ceded to the Kingdom of England. He was a major figure in the history of New York City and his name has been given to various landmarks and points of interest throughout the city (e.g. Stuyvesant High School, Stuyvesant Town, Bedford–Stuyvesant neighborhood, etc.).

Stuyvesant's accomplishments as director-general of New Netherland included a great expansion for the settlement of New Amsterdam beyond the southern tip of Manhattan. Among the projects built by Stuyvesant's administration were the protective wall on Wall Street, the canal that became Broad Street, and Broadway. Stuyvesant, himself a member of the Dutch Reformed Church, opposed religious pluralism and came into conflict with Lutherans, Jews, Roman Catholics, and Quakers as they attempted to build places of worship in the city and practice their faiths.

== Early life ==
Peter Stuyvesant was born around 1610 (Note: The exact year of Stuyvesant's birth is not known with certainty. Other years which have been put forward include 1602, 1610, 1611, and 1612. There is no definitive or universally accepted date.) in Peperga or — more unlikely — Scherpenzeel, Friesland, in the Netherlands, to Balthasar Stuyvesant, a Reformed Calvinist minister, and Margaretha Hardenstein. He grew up in Peperga, Scherpenzeel, and Berlikum. There is previously an erroneous report that Stuyvesant was born in Scherpenzeel in 1592 or 1602. However, his father (Balthazar Stuyvesant) only became a pastor in the Frisian Scherpenzeel between 1612 and 1619 and was previously in Peperga, so Peperga is the likely birthplace of Peter.

== Career ==
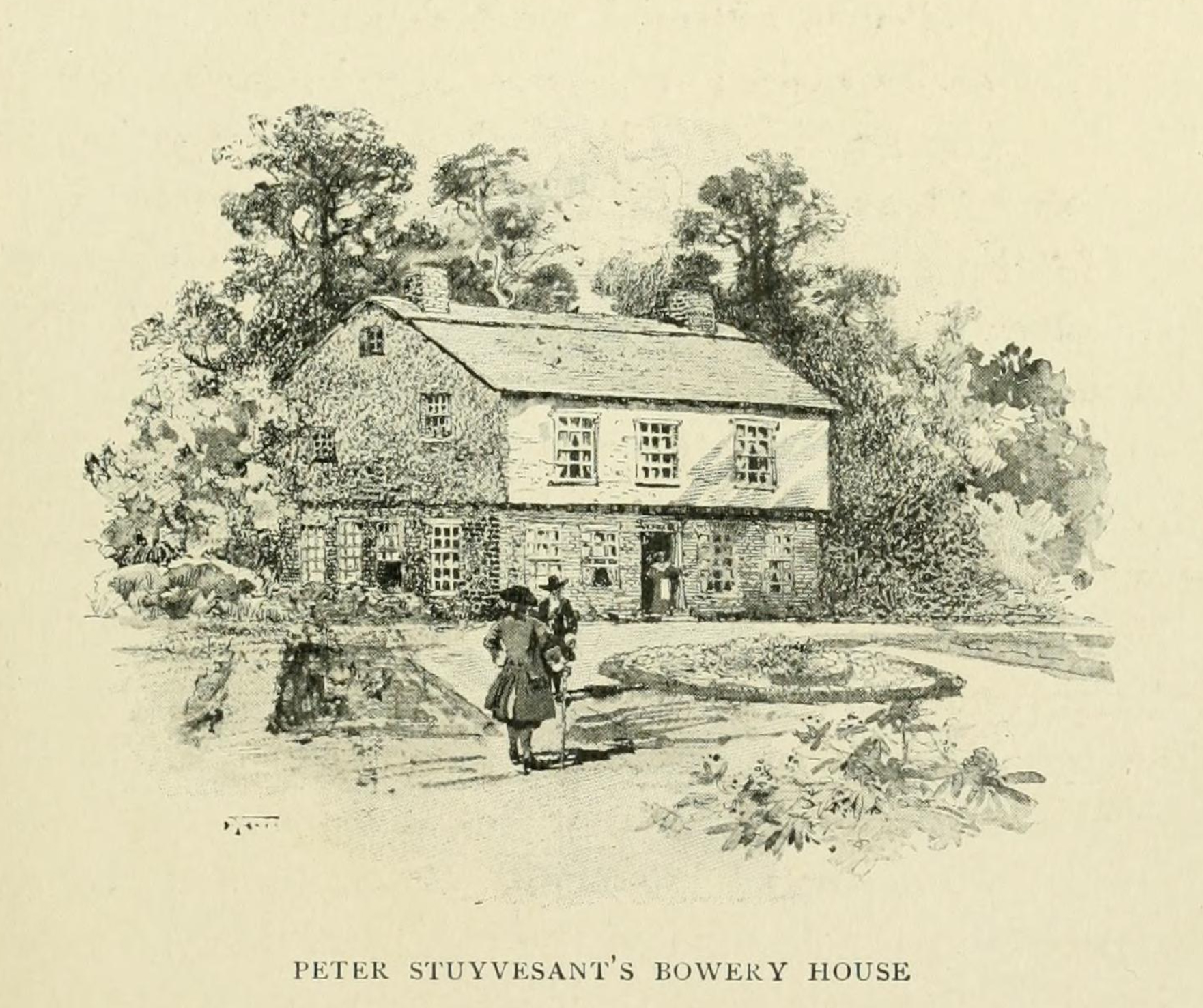
Peter Stuyvesant's Bowery house

At the age of 20, Stuyvesant went to the University of Franeker, where he studied languages and philosophy, but several years later he was expelled from the school after he seduced the daughter of his landlord. He was then sent to Amsterdam by his father, where Stuyvesant – now using the Latinized version of his first name, "Petrus", to indicate that he had university schooling – joined the Dutch West India Company (GWC). In 1630, the company assigned him to be their commercial agent on a small island just off of Brazil, Fernando de Noronha, and then five years later transferred him to the nearby Brazilian state of Pernambuco. In 1638, he was moved again, this time to the colony of Curaçao, the main Dutch naval base in the West Indies, where, just four years later, aged 30, he became the acting governor of that colony, as well as Aruba and Bonaire, a position he held until 1644.

In April 1644, he coordinated and led an attack on the island of Saint Martin, which the Spanish had taken from the Dutch. Stuyvesant thought they had few men. When Stuyvesant raised the Dutch flag, the Spanish fired. Stuyvesant was injured in the leg, which required amputation, and the battle was lost.

Stuyvesant returned to the Netherlands for convalescence, where his right leg was replaced with a wooden peg. Stuyvesant was given the nicknames "Peg Leg Pete" and "Old Silver Nails" because he used a wooden stick studded with silver nails as a prosthesis. The West India Company saw the loss of Stuyvesant's leg as a "Roman" sacrifice, while Stuyvesant himself saw the fact that he did not die from his injury as a sign that God was saving him to do great things. A year later, in May 1645, he was selected by the company to replace Willem Kieft as Director-General of the New Netherland colony, including New Amsterdam, the site of present-day New York City.

=== New Netherland ===
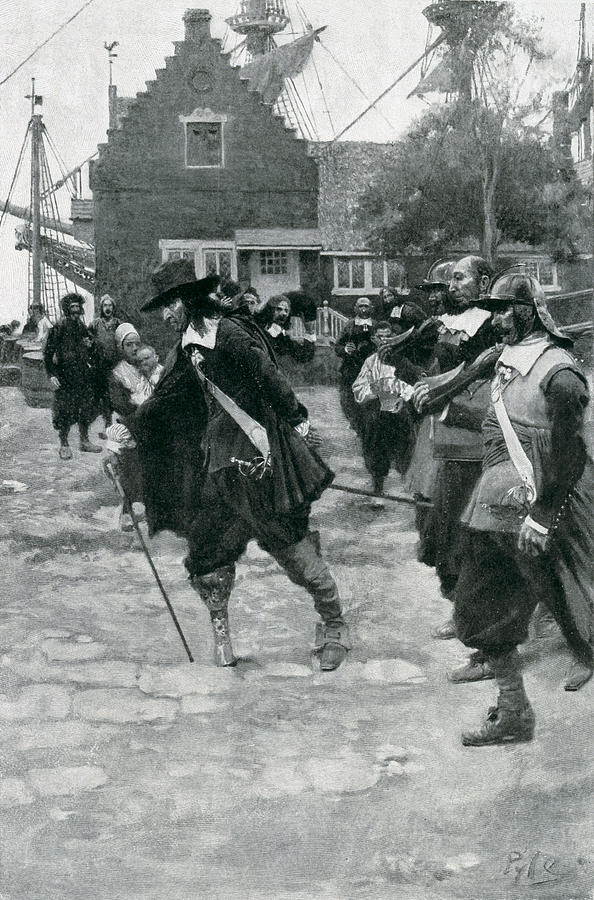
Stuyvesant's arrival in New Amsterdam

Stuyvesant had to wait for his appointment to be confirmed by the Dutch States-General. During that time he married Judith Bayard, who was the daughter of a Huguenot minister and hailed from Breda. Together, they left Amsterdam in December 1646 and, after stopping at Curaçao, arrived in New Amsterdam by May 1647.

Kieft's incompetence had left the colony in terrible condition. Only a small number of villages remained after the brutal wars launched by his administration, and many of their inhabitants had given up and returned to Europe, leaving only 250 to 300 men able to carry arms. Kieft himself had obtained a fortune of over 4,000 guilders without explanation and spent much of it to feed his growing alcoholism.

Certain that righting New Netherland was the work which God had saved him for, Stuyvesant told its remaining people "I shall govern you as a father his children," and began the task of rebuilding the physical and moral state of the colony.

In September 1647 he appointed the Nine Men, an advisory council composed of representatives of the colonists, to help rebuild relationships with them, temper his rule with their guidance, and restore New Netherland to the kind of well-run place that the Dutch preferred.

In 1648 a conflict began between him and Brant Aertzsz van Slechtenhorst, the commissary of the patroonship Rensselaerwijck, which surrounded Fort Orange (present-day Albany). Stuyvesant claimed he had power over Rensselaerwijck, despite special privileges granted to Kiliaen van Rensselaer in the patroonship regulations of 1629. When Van Slechtenhorst refused, Stuyvesant sent a group of soldiers to enforce his orders. The controversy that followed resulted in the founding of the new settlement, Beverwijck.

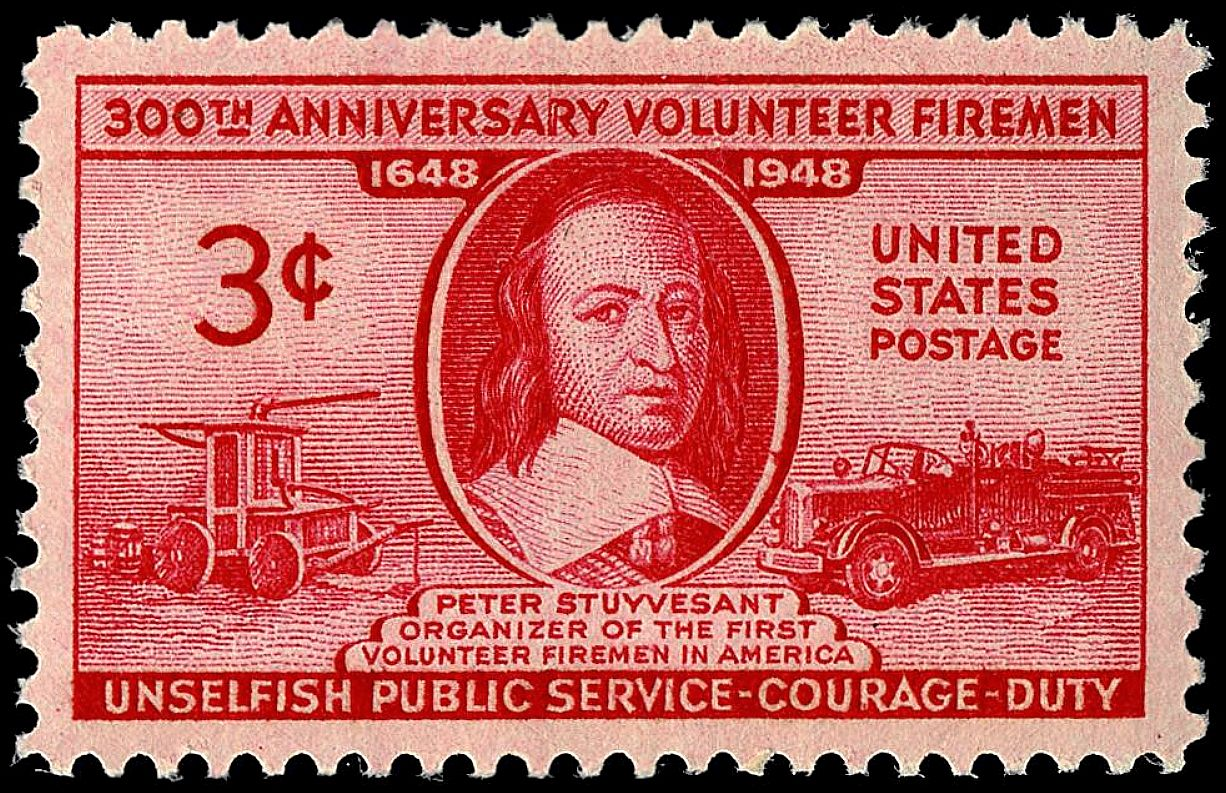
Peter Stuyvesant "Organizer of the first volunteer firemen in America", Volunteer firemen issue of 1948

In an effort to remedy civic neglect under Kieft's administration, Stuyvesant took measures to improve the appearance and safety of the town, with numerous regulations routinely issued by his office. Building codes were established, including the requirement of fences to control the widespread problem of wandering livestock about the town. As the close-packed wooden houses created a grave risk of fire, Stuyvesant forbade the construction of wooden chimneys, and imposed a tax of a beaver skin on every household to finance the purchase of two hundred and fifty leather fire buckets, hooks, and ladders from Holland. He established a system of fire wardens and a volunteer fire watch that patrolled the streets every night, creating the first volunteer fire department in America.

=== External threats ===
The colony of New Netherland, with a large area, a small fractious population, and paltry military backing from the profit-minded Company, was hard pressed to defend itself. The most serious threat came from the trading rivalry with England. Second were the conflicts with neighboring Indian tribes whose small war bands raided the scattered Dutch outposts. Stuyvesant's greatest success came in dealing with the Delaware River colony of New Sweden, which he invaded and annexed in 1655.

Relations with the English Connecticut Colony were strained, with land disputes in the Connecticut valley and eastern Long island. The treaty of Hartford of 1650 was a victory for the English, as Stuyvesant gave up claims to the Connecticut Valley while gaining only a small portion of Long island. In any case, Connecticut settlers ignored the treaty and steadily poured into the Hudson Valley, where they agitated against Stuyvesant.

Eventually in 1664, England sent an expeditionary force to capture New Netherland. The colony's settlers refused to fight, forcing Stuyvesant to surrender and ending the Dutch era of the colony.

=== Expansion of the colony ===
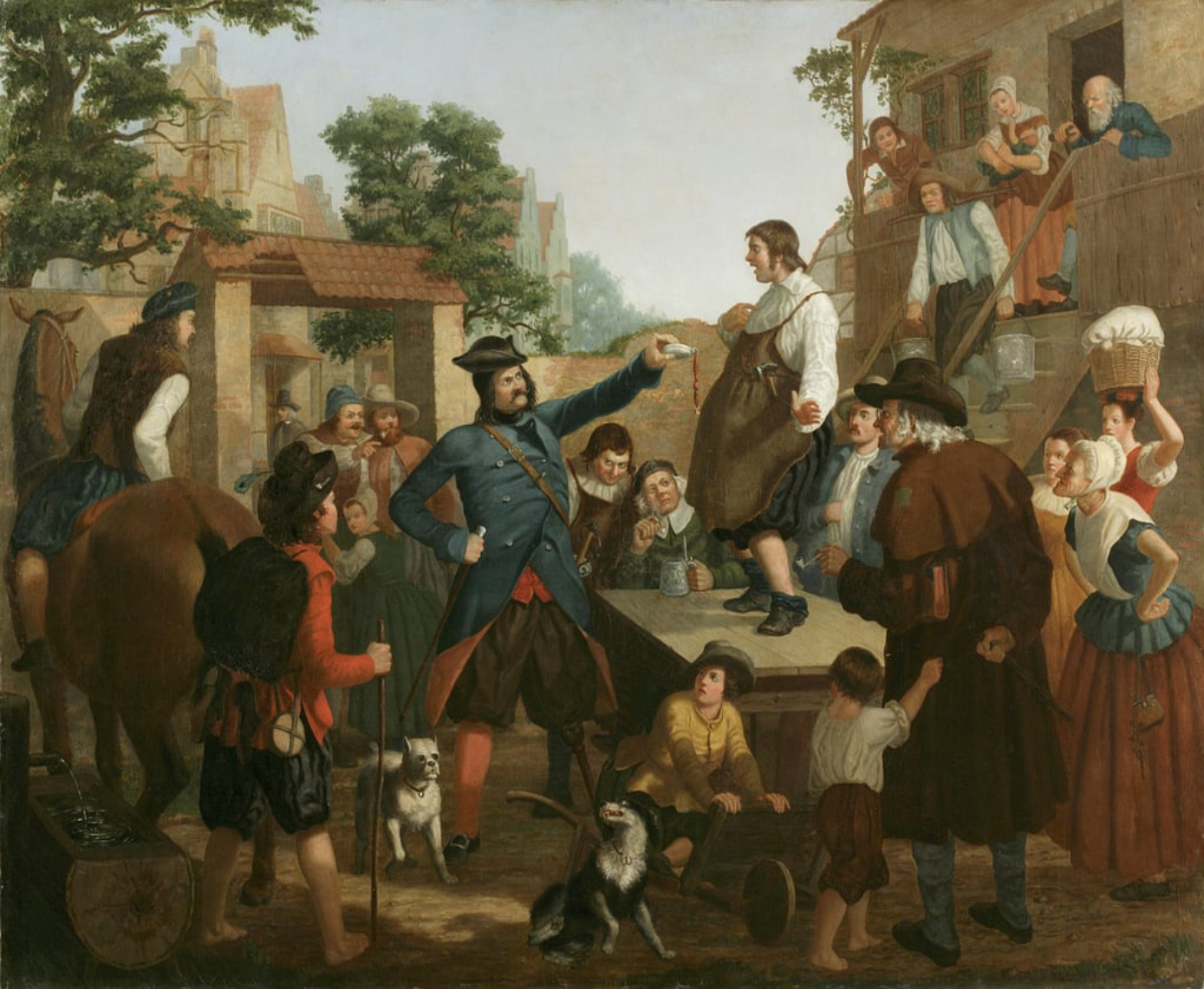
Peter Stuyvesant and the Cobbler by John Whetton Ehninger

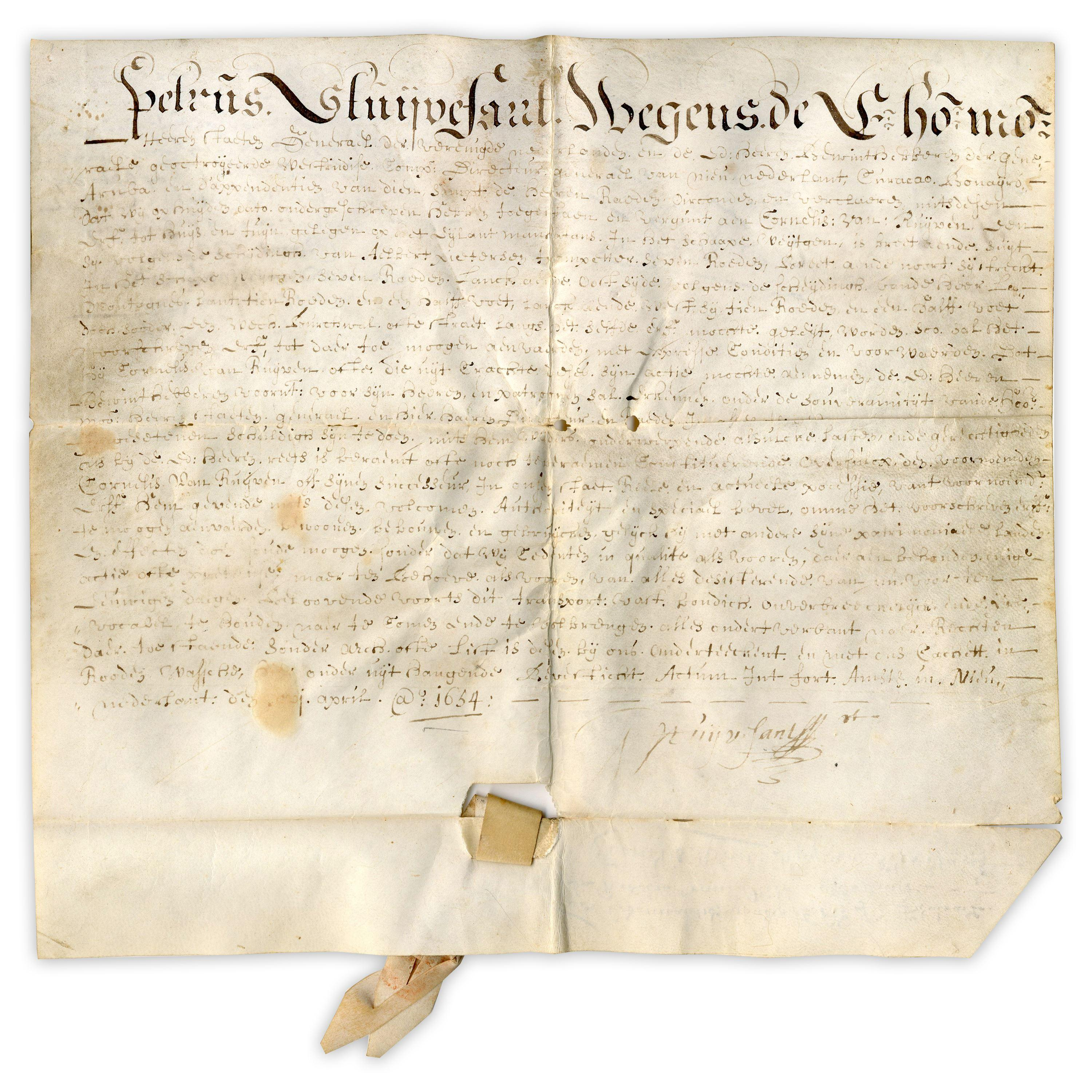
Peter Stuyvesant's deed for a part of Manhattan (now Financial District), 1654

Stuyvesant became involved in a dispute with Theophilus Eaton, the governor of English New Haven Colony, over the border of the two colonies. In September 1650, a meeting of the commissioners on boundaries took place in Hartford, Connecticut, called the Treaty of Hartford, to settle the border between New Amsterdam and the English colonies to the north and east. The border was arranged to the dissatisfaction of the Nine Men, who declared that "the governor had ceded away enough territory to found fifty colonies each fifty miles square." Stuyvesant then threatened to dissolve the council. A new plan of municipal government was arranged in the Netherlands, and the name "New Amsterdam" was officially declared on 2 February 1653. Stuyvesant made a speech for the occasion, saying that his authority would remain undiminished.

Stuyvesant was then ordered to the Netherlands, but the order was soon revoked under pressure from the States of Holland and the city of Amsterdam. Stuyvesant prepared against an attack by ordering the citizens to dig a ditch from the North River to the East River and to erect a fortification.

In 1653, a convention of two deputies from each village in New Netherland demanded reforms, and Stuyvesant commanded that assembly to disperse, saying: "We derive our authority from God and the company, not from a few ignorant subjects."

In 1654, Stuyvesant signed a deed for an allotment of land 10,000 square feet (930 m^{2}) that corresponds to the modern-day Financial District of lower Manhattan. It was co-signed by land grantee and secretary of the New Netherland Council Cornelis van Ruijven (alternative spelling Ruyven). The lot was given and granted to van Ruijven. The deed conveys a tract of land on Manhattan island in the Sheep Pasture. It was bounded by present-day Broad Street to William Street, and Beaver Street to Exchange Place.

In the summer of 1655, he sailed down to the Delaware River with a fleet of seven vessels and about 300 men and took possession of the colony of New Sweden, which was renamed "New Amstel." In his absence, Pavonia and Staten Island were attacked by Native Americans on 15 September 1655 in what became known as the Peach War.

c. 1657 Stuyvesant built an executive mansion out of stone that was later renamed Whitehall by the English. In 1660, Stuyvesant was quoted as saying that "Nothing is of greater importance than the early instruction of youth." In 1661, New Amsterdam had one grammar school, two free elementary schools, and had licensed 28 schoolmasters.

As director-general of New Netherland, Stuyvesant greatly increased the colony's involvement with slavery. During the late 1640s, authorities in the neighboring English colonies of Connecticut and Maryland encouraged New Netherland slaves to escape there, refusing to return them. In 1650, Stuyvesant threatened to offer freedom to Maryland slaves unless the colony stopped sheltering runaways from New Netherland. In 1657, the GWC's directors wrote to Stuyvesant, telling him that they were not going to be able to send him all the tradesmen that he requested and that he would have to use slaves as well. Although it is commonly thought that Stuyvesant was New Netherland's largest slaveholder, he only owned two slaves, purchasing them as part of the farm he bought from the GWC in 1651.

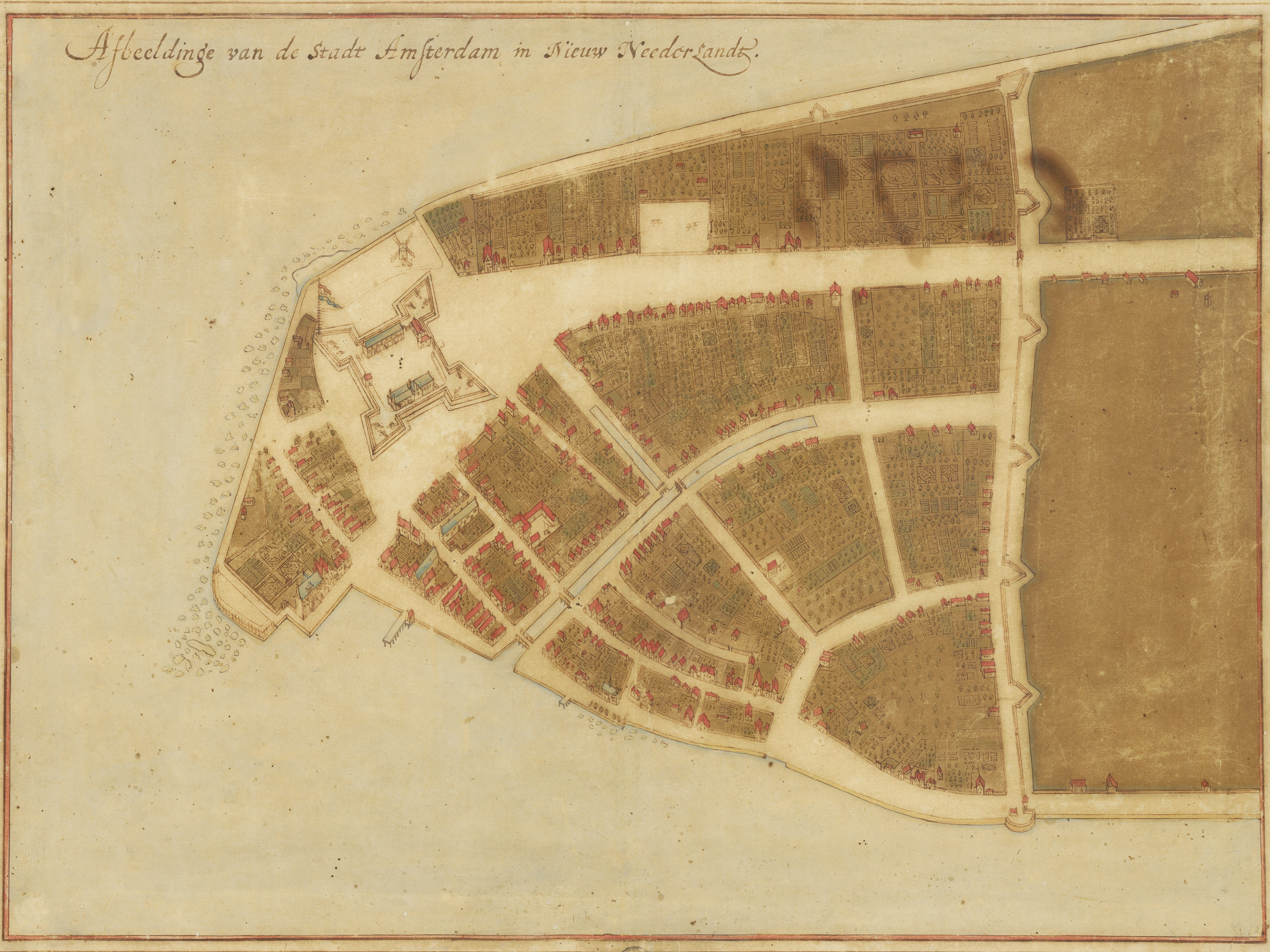
The Castello Plan of 1660 is the only Dutch-era map of the settlement on Manhattan

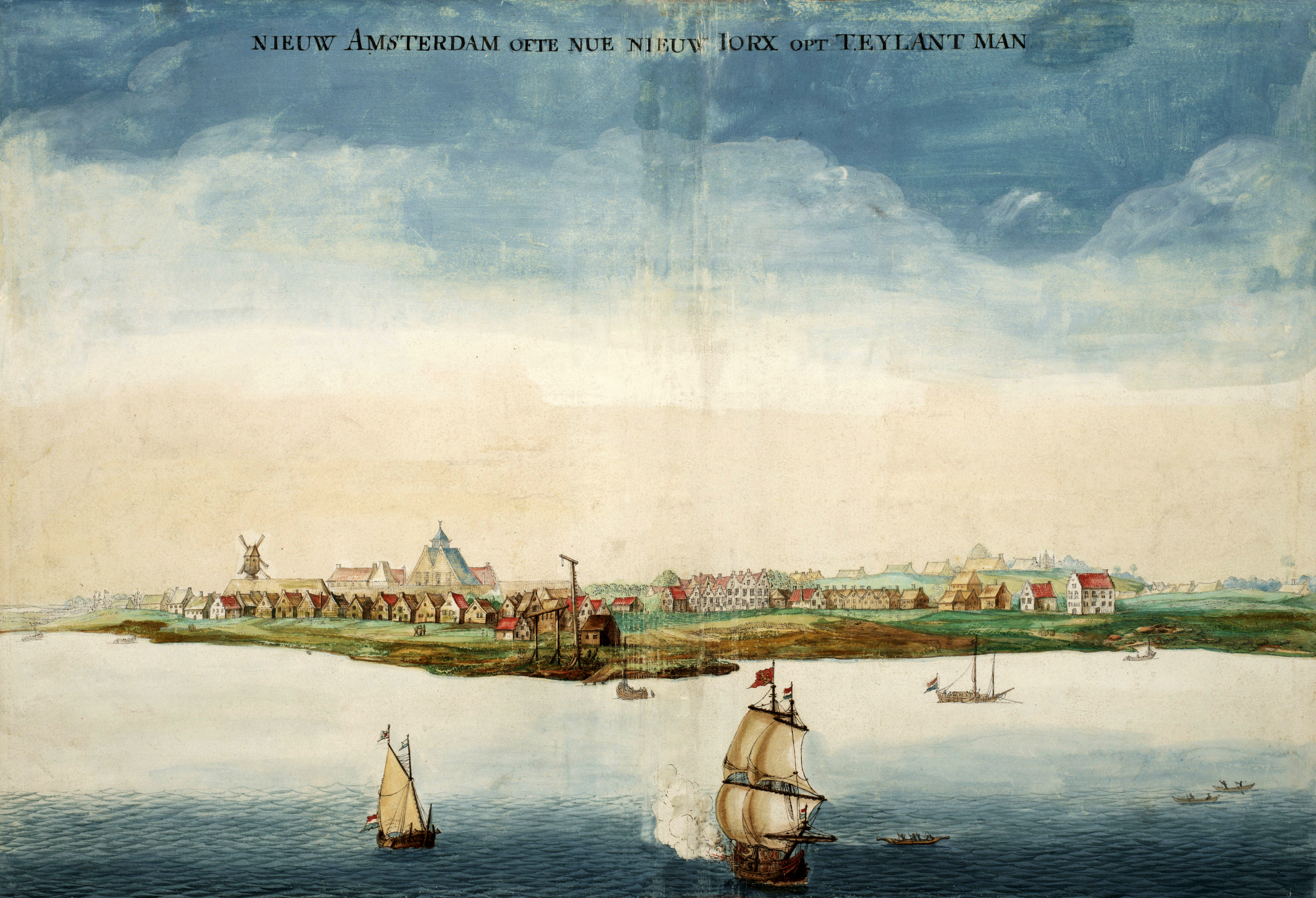
New Amsterdam in 1664, the year it was taken over by the British

=== Religious freedom ===
Stuyvesant did not tolerate full religious freedom in the colony, and was strongly committed to the supremacy of the Dutch Reformed Church. In 1657 he refused Lutherans the right to organize a church. When he also issued an ordinance forbidding them from worshiping in their own homes, the directors of the GWC, three of whom were Lutherans, told him to rescind the order and allow private gatherings of Lutherans. The Company position was that more tolerance led to more trade and benefited everyone.

Freedom of religion was further tested when Stuyvesant refused to allow the permanent settlement of Jewish refugees from Dutch Brazil in New Amsterdam (without passports), and join the handful of existing Jewish traders (with passports from Amsterdam). Stuyvesant pressed Jews leave the colony "in a friendly way". As he wrote to the Amsterdam Chamber of the GWC in 1654, he hoped that "the deceitful race, — such hateful enemies and blasphemers of the name of Christ, — be not allowed to further infect and trouble this new colony." He referred to Jews as a "deceitful race" and "usurers", and was concerned that "Jewish settlers should not be granted the same liberties enjoyed by Jews in Holland, lest members of other persecuted minority groups, such as Roman Catholics, be attracted to the colony."

Stuyvesant's decision was again rescinded after pressure from the directors of the company. As a result, Jewish immigrants were allowed to stay in the colony as long as their community was self-supporting. However, Stuyvesant would not allow them to build a synagogue, forcing them to worship instead in a private house.

In 1657, the Quakers, who were newly arrived in the colony, drew his attention. He ordered the public torture of Robert Hodgson, a 23-year-old Quaker convert who had become an influential preacher. Stuyvesant then made an ordinance, punishable by fine and imprisonment, against anyone found guilty of harboring Quakers. That action led to a protest from the citizens of Flushing, which came to be known as the Flushing Remonstrance, considered by some historians to be a precursor to the United States Constitution's provision on freedom of religion in the Bill of Rights.

=== Capitulation ===
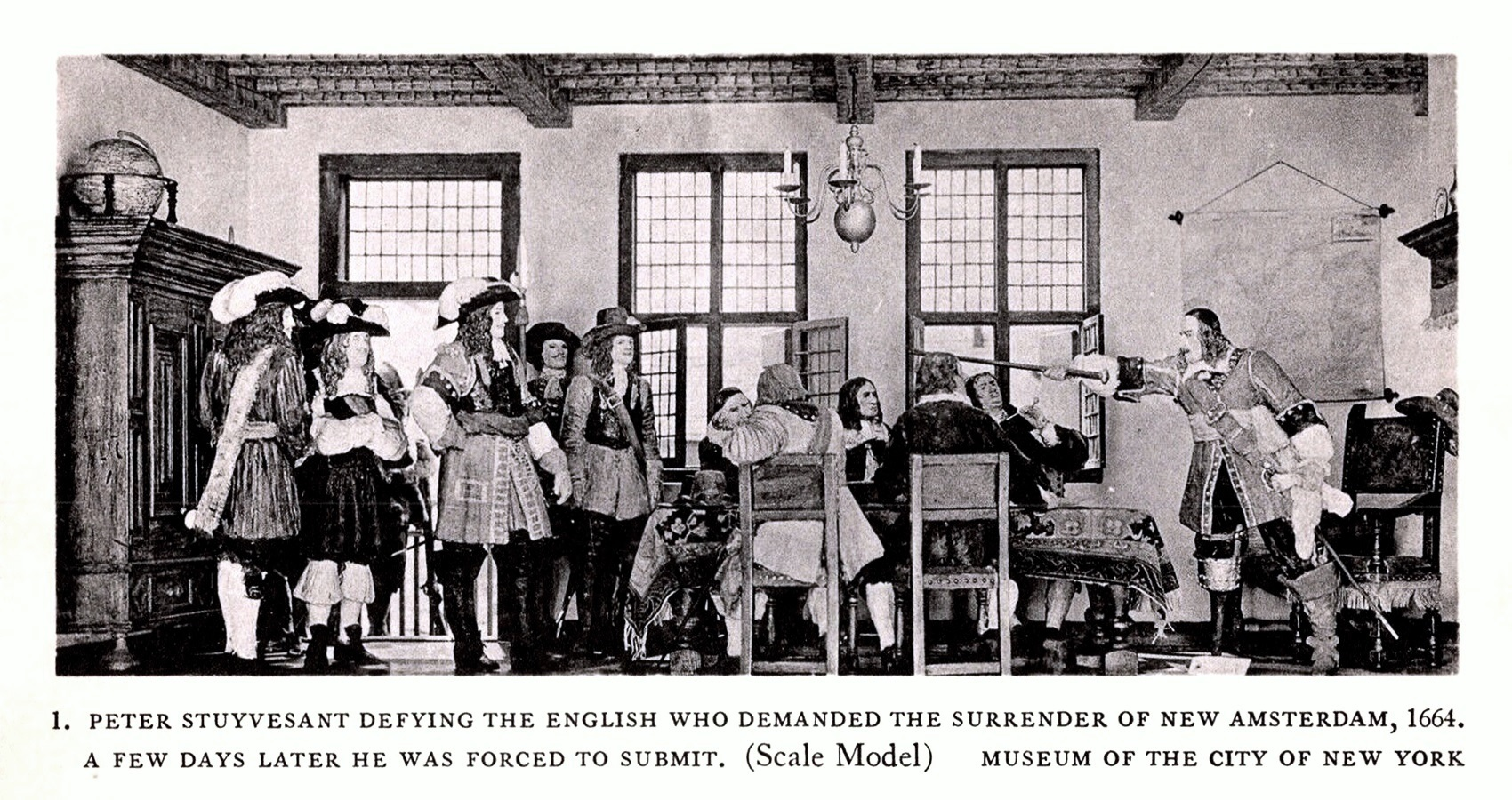
Peter Stuyvesant's surrender of New Amsterdam (scale model)

In 1664, King Charles II of England ceded to his brother, the Duke of York, later King James II, a large tract of land that included all of New Netherland. This came at a period of considerable conflict between England and the Netherlands in the Anglo-Dutch Wars. Four English ships bearing 450 men, commanded by Richard Nicolls, seized the Dutch colony. On 30 August 1664, George Cartwright sent the governor a letter demanding surrender. He promised "life, estate, and liberty to all who would submit to the king's authority."

On 6 September 1664, Stuyvesant sent Johannes de Decker, a lawyer for the West India Company, and five others to sign the Articles of Capitulation. Nicolls was declared governor, and the city was renamed New York. Stuyvesant obtained civil rights and freedom of religion in the Articles of Capitulation. The Dutch settlers mainly belonged to the Dutch Reformed church, a Calvinist denomination, holding to the Three Forms of Unity (Belgic Confession, Heidelberg Catechism, Canons of Dordt). The English were Anglicans, holding to the 39 Articles, a Protestant confession, with bishops.

== Personal life ==
In 1645, Stuyvesant married Judith Bayard (c. 1610–1687) of the Bayard family. Her brother, Samuel Bayard, was the husband of Stuyvesant's sister, Anna Stuyvesant. Petrus and Judith had two sons together:

- Balthasar Lazarus Stuyvesant (1647–1678), who settled in the West Indies and married Maria Lucas Raapzaat
- Nicolaes Willem Stuyvesant (1648–1698), who first married Maria Beekman (1650–1679), daughter of Wilhelmus Beekman, and after her death, Elisabeth Slechtenhorst.

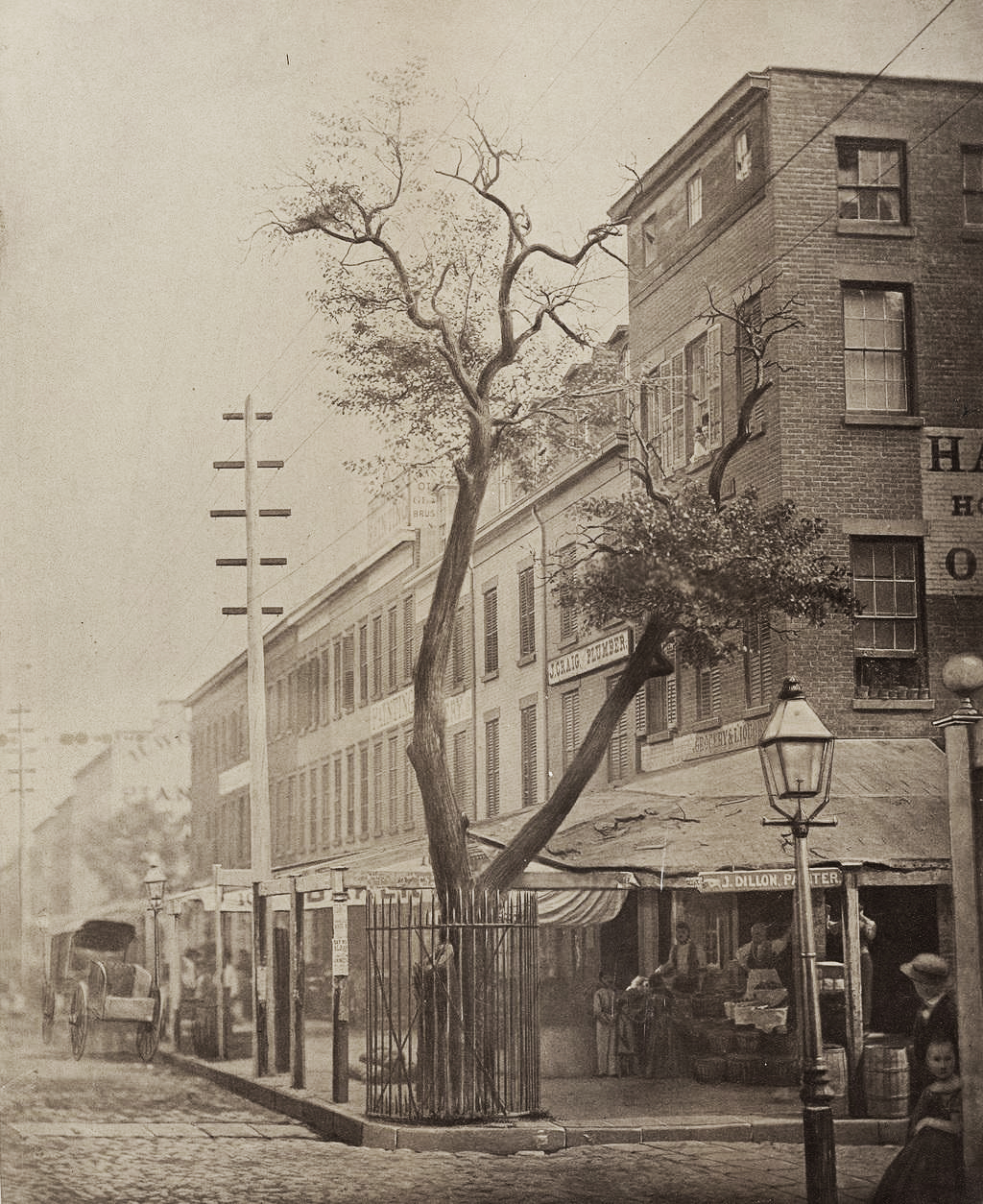
Stuyvesant's Pear Tree, 1863

In 1665, Stuyvesant went to the Netherlands to report on his term as governor. On his return to the colony, he spent the remainder of his life outside the city on his 62-acre (25 ha) farm, Stuyvesant Farm, also known as the Great Bouwerie, beyond which stretched the woods and swamps of the village of Nieuw Haarlem. He died in August 1672 and his body was entombed in the east wall of St. Mark's Church in-the-Bowery, which sits on the site of Stuyvesant's family chapel.

A pear tree that he reputedly brought from the Netherlands in 1647 remained at the corner of Thirteenth Street and Third Avenue until 1867 when it was destroyed by a storm, bearing fruit almost to the last. The house on the Great Bouwerie was destroyed by fire in 1778.

=== Descendants ===
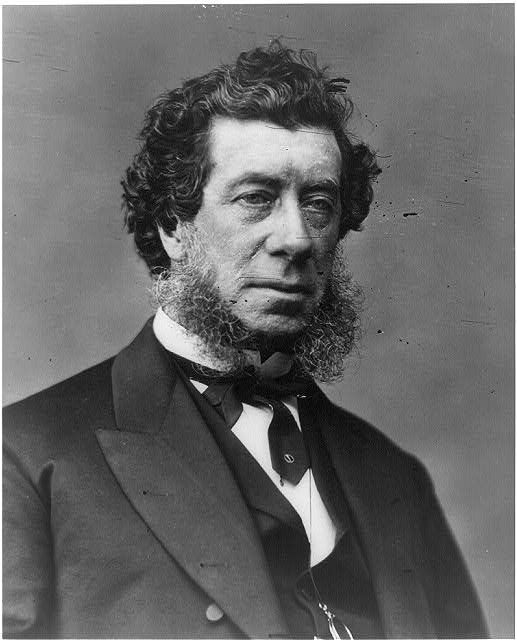
Hamilton Fish, a Governor of New York, was descended from Stuyvesant.

The last acknowledged descendant of Peter Stuyvesant to bear his surname was Augustus van Horne Stuyvesant Jr., who died a bachelor in 1953 at the age of 83 in his mansion at 2 East 79th Street. Rutherfurd Stuyvesant, the 19th-century New York developer, and his descendants are also descended from Peter Stuyvesant; however, Rutherford Stuyvesant's name was changed from Stuyvesant Rutherford in 1863 to satisfy the terms of the 1847 will of Peter Gerard Stuyvesant.

His descendants include:

- Hamilton Fish (1808–1893), the 16th governor of New York, a United States senator and United States Secretary of State
- John Winthrop Chanler (1826–1877), a lawyer and a U.S. Representative from New York
- Stuyvesant Fish Morris (1843–1928), a prominent physician.
- Stuyvesant Fish (1851–1923), a president of the Illinois Central Railroad who was prominent in the U.S. Gilded Age
- Lewis Stuyvesant Chanler (1869–1942), a lieutenant governor of New York
- Edith Stuyvesant Gerry (1873–1958), an American philanthropist who was married to George Washington Vanderbilt II and Peter Goelet Gerry
- Stuyvesant Wainwright II (1921–2010), US Congressman, descendant through his great-great-grandfather John Howard Wainwright, who married Margaret Stuyvesant.
- Loudon Wainwright Jr. (1924–1988), an American writer
- John Smith (1931–1995), the American actor who starred in two NBC western television series Cimarron City, is a descendant.
- Loudon Wainwright III (b. 1946), the American singer-songwriter is a descendant through his great-great-grandfather John Howard Wainwright, who married Margaret Stuyvesant.
- Peter Robinson (Robin) Fish (b. 1969), deputy head at Robert Gordon's College
- Chase Coleman III (b.1975), hedge fund manager, Tiger Global Management

== Legacy ==
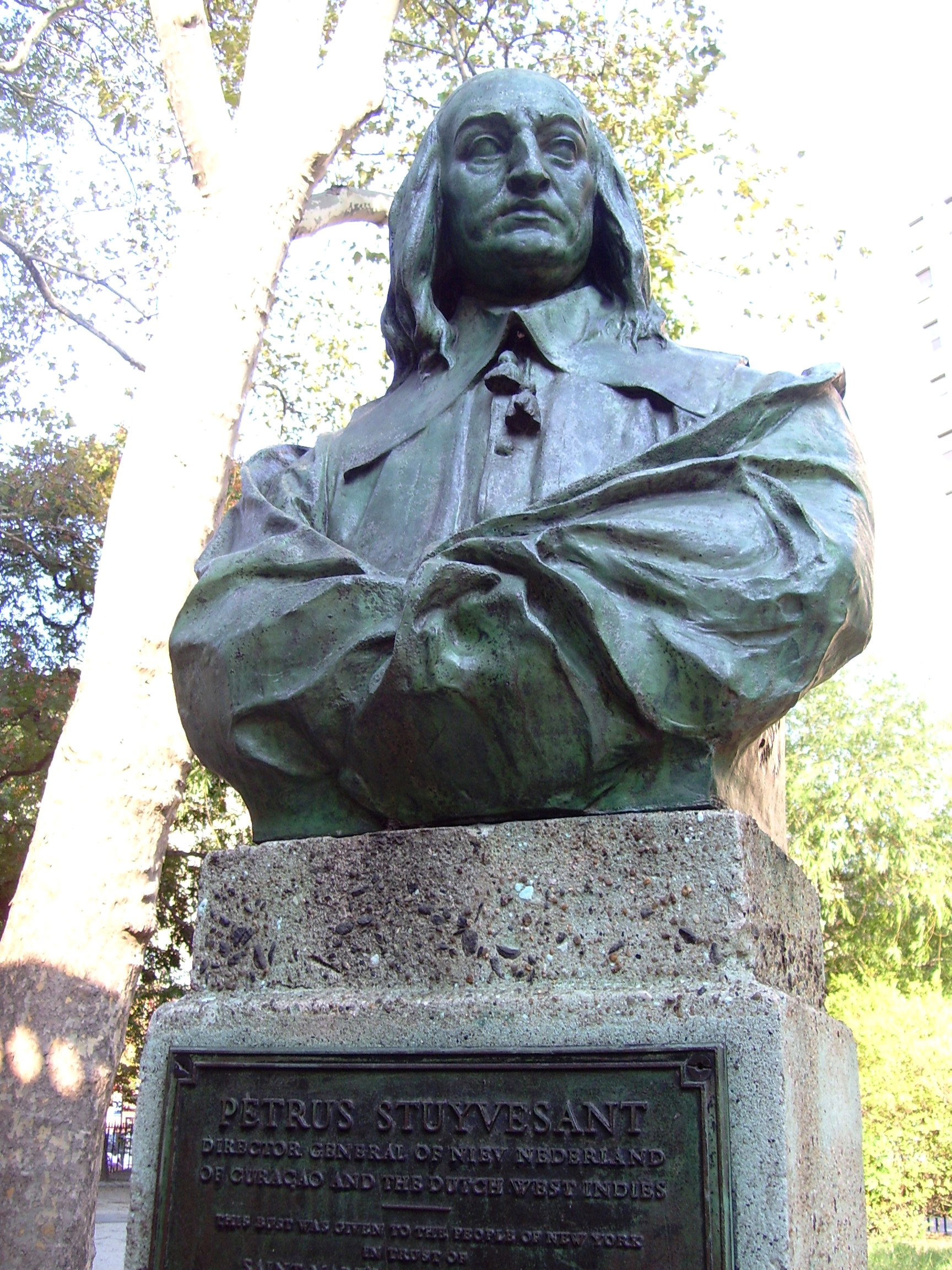
A bust of Stuyvesant by Dutch artist Toon Dupuis which was presented by Queen Wilhelmina and the Dutch Government to St. Mark's Church in-the-Bowery on 5 December 1915

According to historian Eleanor Bruchey:

Peter Stuyvesant was essentially a difficult man thrust into a difficult position. Quick tempered, self-confident, and authoritarian, he was determined...to rule firmly and to repair the fortunes of the company. The company, however, had run the colony solely for trade profits, with scant attention to encouraging immigration and developing local government. Stuyvesant's predecessors...had been dishonest or, at best, inept, so there was no tradition of respect and support for the governorship on which he could build. Furthermore, the colonists were vocal and quick to challenge authority....Throughout his administration there were constant complaints to the company of his tyrannical acts and pressure for more local self-government....His religious intolerance also exacerbated relations with the colonists, most of whom did not share his narrow outlook.

Stuyvesant and his family were large landowners in the northeastern portion of New Amsterdam, and the Stuyvesant name is currently associated with several places in Manhattan's East Side, near present-day Gramercy Park: the Stuyvesant Town housing complex; the site of the original Stuyvesant High School, still marked Stuyvesant on its front face, on East 15th Street near First Avenue; Stuyvesant Cove Park and Stuyvesant Square, public parks in the area; the Stuyvesant Apartments on East 18th Street; and Stuyvesant Street, a thoroughfare in the East Village. The new Stuyvesant High, a premier public high school, is on Chambers Street near the World Trade Center. His farm, called the "Bouwerij" – the seventeenth-century Dutch word for "farm" – was the source for the name of the Manhattan street and surrounding neighborhood named "The Bowery". The contemporary neighborhood of Bedford–Stuyvesant, Brooklyn includes Stuyvesant Heights and retains its name. Also named after him are the hamlets of Stuyvesant and Stuyvesant Falls in Columbia County, New York, where descendants of the early Dutch settlers still live and where the Dutch Reformed Church remains an important part of the community, as well as shopping centers, yacht clubs and other buildings and facilities throughout the area where the Dutch colony once was.

The Peter Stuyvesant Monument by J. Massey Rhind situated at Bergen Square in Jersey City was dedicated in 1915 to mark the 250th anniversary of the Dutch settlement there. The World War II Liberty Ship SS Peter Stuyvesant was named in his honor. A passenger ferry named Peter Stuyvesant operated on the Hudson River between New York City and New Jersey. In 1963, it was purchased and placed on permanent mooring next to Anthony's Pier 4 in Boston, Massachusetts; it broke free, listed, and ultimately sank during the Blizzard of 1978.

Stuyvesant has also received prominent fictional representations. A heavily exaggerated Stuyvesant features as the protagonist of the latter three books of Washington Irving's 1809 satirical History of New York. Irving's characterization later inspired Stuyvesant's appearance as the villain in the musical Knickerbocker Holiday by Kurt Weill and Maxwell Anderson. Walter Huston, playing Stuyvesant, introduced the musical's best-known song, "September Song," Weill's first American hit. In the 1944 film adaptation, Stuyvesant is played by Charles Coburn.

In 2025, a library of biographies, children's books and comics about Stuyvesant's life was opened on St. Maarten, one kilometre from where he lost his leg during the siege of Fort Amsterdam.

== See also ==
- Adriaen van der Donck
- History of the Jews in the Netherlands
- Colonial history of the United States
- Dutch colonization of the Americas
- Dutch Empire
- Peter Minuit
- List of colonial governors of New York

== Bibliography ==
- Abbott, (John Stevens Cabot (1873). Peter Stuyvesant : the last Dutch governor of New Amsterdam. New York: Dodd & Mead.
- Burrows, Edwin G. and Wallace, Mike (1999). Gotham: A History of New York City to 1898. New York: Oxford University Press. ISBN 0-195-11634-8.
- Chisholm, Hugh, ed. (1911). "Stuyvesant, Peter" . Encyclopædia Britannica. Vol. 25 (11th ed.). Cambridge University Press. p. 1005.
- Bruchey, Eleanor. "Stuyvesant, Peter" in John A. Garraty, ed. Encyclopedia of American Biography (2nd ed. 1996) p. 1065 online
- Corning, A. Elwood (1918). Hamilton Fish. New York: The Lanmere Publishing Company.
- Haefeli, Evan (2016). New Netherland and the Dutch origins of American religious liberty. Philadelphia: University of Pennsylvania Press. ISBN 978-0-81222-3781.
- Jacobs, Jaap (2005), New Netherland: A Dutch Colony in Seventeenth-Century America (Leiden: Brill Academic Publishers), ISBN 90-04-12906-5.
  - Kessler, Henry Howard (1959). Peter Stuyvesant and his New York. New York: Random House.
- Krizner, L. J., and Lisa Sita. Peter Stuyvesant: New Amsterdam and the Origins of New York (Rosen, 2000) for middle schools.
- Merwick, Donna. Stuyvesant Bound: An Essay on Loss Across Time (U of Pennsylvania Press, 2013) 212 pp
  - Shaw Romney, Susanah. "Peter Stuyvesant: Premodern Man" Reviews in American History (2014) 42#4 pp 584–589. review of Merwick.
- Otto, Paul. "Stuyvesant, Peter" American National Biography (1999) online, a short scholarly biography
- Peabody, Michael D. (November–December 2005). "The Flushing Remonstrance". Liberty Magazine.
- Shorto, Russell. The Island at the Center of the World: the epic story of Dutch Manhattan and the forgotten colony that shaped America (New York: Doubleday, 2004).
- Tuckerman, Bayard. Peter Stuyvesant (JA Hill, 1893) online.
- Whitridge, Arnold. "Peter Stuyvesant: Director General of New Netherland." History Today (May 1960) 10#4 pp 324–332.

=== Primary sources ===
- O'Callaghan, Edmund B. ed., Documents Relative to the Colonial History of the State of New York (Albany: Weed, Parsons and Company, 1854), 3:387; Elizabeth Donnan, ed., Documents Illustrative of the History of the Slave Trade to America (Washington, DC : Carnegie Institution, 1930), 3:429.

Government offices
Preceded by Willem Kieft	Director-General of New Netherland; 1647–1664	Succeeded by Richard Nicolls (as Governor of the Province of New York)
