= Johannes de Decker =

New Netherland official

Johannes De Decker (c. 1626 - Unknown) was a Dutch lawyer and colonial official. He was one of the six signers of the articles of capitulation of New Amsterdam to the English on September 6, 1664. De Decker was sent to work as a lawyer for Peter Stuyvesant in New Amsterdam by the Dutch West India Company (WIC) in 1654. He held various top political positions and in 1657 was appointed Comptroller. On September 10, Johannes sailed to Fort Orange to warn them an English expeditionary force was coming and to rally local forces. However, Fort Orange officially surrendered September 24, 1664.

De Decker was a lawyer, member of the council of the government that ruled New Amsterdam, and lead negotiator for the 1664 Articles of Surrender of New Netherland. He reported directly to Stuyvesant. Ten days after the English took over, De Decker was expelled from New York for organising opposition to English rule in Fort Orange. Six years later, in 1670, De Decker was allowed back into New York on condition that he stayed only on his 60-acre farm on Staten Island.

== See also ==
- Schout
- Schepen

== See also ==
- The Saint Nicholas Society of the City of New York: history, Volume 2. 1916. Saint Nicholas Society of the City of New York
- Old Families of Staten Island. 2009. J. J. Clute.
- Staten Island and its people: a history: 1609–1929. 1933. Charles William Leng, William Thompson Davis.
- The Gilder Lehrman Collection GLC00377 [www.gilderlehrman.org original document, articles of surrender 1664]
