= Tiger Global Management =

American investment firm

Tiger Global Management, LLC

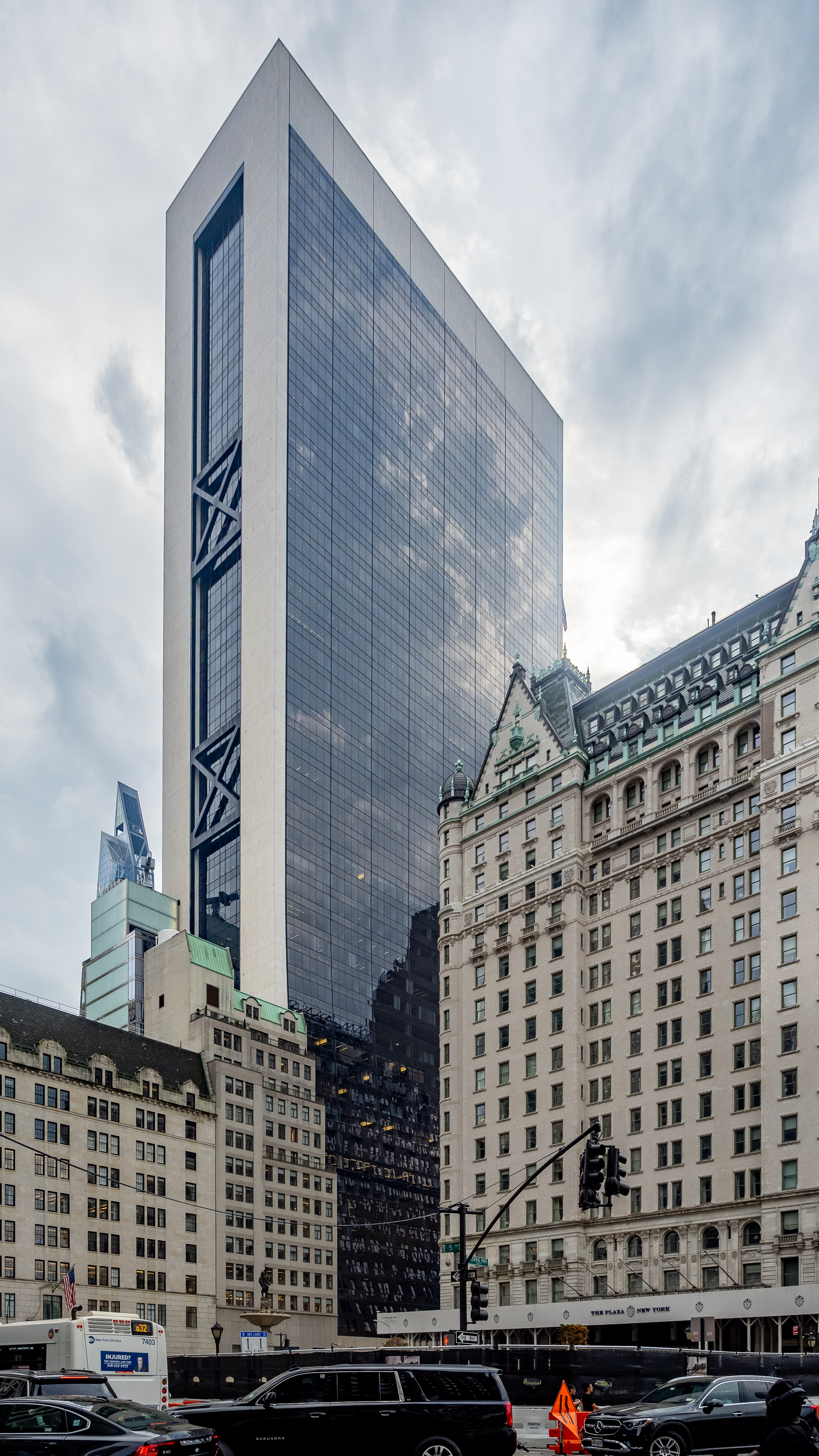
- Headquartered in the Solow Building
- Formerly: Tiger Technology Management LLC
- Type: Private
- Industry: Investment Management
- Founded: March 2001; 25 years ago
- Founder: Chase Coleman III
- Headquarters: Solow Building, 9 West 57th Street, New York City, New York, U.S.
- Products: Hedge fund; Private equity; Venture capital
- AUM: US$55.9 billion (May 2024)
- Number of employees: 162 (2022)
- Website: tigerglobal.com

Tiger Global Management, LLC (often referred to as Tiger Global and formerly known as Tiger Technology) is an American investment firm founded by Chase Coleman III, a former Tiger Management employee under Julian Robertson, in March 2001. It mainly focuses on internet, software, consumer, and financial technology companies.

== Background and history ==
Chase Coleman III was a protégé of Julian Robertson and from 1997 to 2000 worked as a technology analyst for the firm, Tiger Management. In 2000, Robertson closed Tiger Management, and entrusted Coleman with over $25 million to manage, making him one of the 30 or more so-called "Tiger Cubs", fund managers who started their fund management careers with Tiger Management.

In 2001, Coleman established Tiger Technology (which would be later renamed to Tiger Global Management, LLC), as a hedge fund to invest in the public equity market. In 2003, Scott Shleifer helped Tiger Global expand into investing in the private equity market.

From the period of 2007 to 2017, according to the Preqin Venture Report, Tiger Global raised the highest amount of capital among venture capital firms.

In 2020, Tiger Global earned its investors $10.4 billion, more than any other hedge fund on the annual list of the top 20 managers compiled by London fund-of-funds firm LCH Investments.

In March 2022, Tiger Global raised $12.7 billion for a new fund to back fast-growing technology companies in their early stages; the firm has reported 900 investors involved in the new fund.

In 2022, the firm experienced significant losses. By June 2022, the firm's hedge fund and its long-only fund had respectively declined 52% and 62% in value since the beginning of the year. The Wall Street Journal and Financial Times reported that these losses eliminated some two-thirds of the value accrued by the hedge fund and the long-only fund over the duration of their existences, while New York cited research indicating the losses could account for three-fourths of lifetime gains. The Wall Street Journal has referred to the hedge fund's loss as "one of the largest-ever", and an anonymous hedge fund manager quoted by New York referred to the losses as "[...] the biggest in the history of hedge funds".

In June, the firm's venture capital losses were reported to be less severe than those of the firm's funds. A letter to investors from Tiger summarizing the performance of its venture funds in the first quarter of 2022 revealed that losses associated with the funds stood at around 9%.

In 2024, Tiger Global rebounded with 24% returns tied to rising technology stocks, but the firm was still recouping recent losses.

== Business overview ==
Tiger Global has two strategies that each manage roughly the same amount of capital.

The public equity business uses equity strategies to invest in publicly traded companies. Its notable funds include Tiger Global Investments (the firm's flagship long-short fund) and Tiger Global Long Opportunities (long-only).

The private equity strategy was led by Scott Shleifer from 2003 until he stepped down into an advisory role in November 2023.

== Private equity funds ==
Fund	Vintage Year	Committed Capital (US$m)
Tiger Global Private Investment Partners I	2003	99
Tiger Global Private Investment Partners II	2007	N/A
Tiger Global Private Investment Partners III	2007	600
Tiger Global Private Investment Partners IV	2007	1,000
Tiger Global Private Investment Partners V	2008	1,100
Tiger Global Private Investment Partners VI	2011	1,250
Tiger Global Private Investment Partners VII	2012	1,490
Tiger Global Private Investment Partners VIII	2014	1,500
Tiger Global Private Investment Partners IX	2014	2,500
Tiger Global Private Investment Partners X	2015	2,500
Tiger Global Private Investment Partners XI	2018	3,750
Tiger Global Private Investment Partners XII	2020	3,750
Tiger Global Private Investment Partners XIV	2021	6,650
Tiger Global Private Investment Partners XV	2021	12,700
Tiger Global Private Investment Partners XVI	2024	2,200

== Notable venture capital investments ==
- Alibaba
- Blank Street Coffee
- Block Inc.
- ByteDance
- Carta
- Coinbase
- Credit Karma
- Databricks
- DST Global
- Facebook
- Flipkart
- Glassdoor
- JD.com
- Kajabi
- Koo
- LinkedIn
- Nextdoor
- Nubank
- PAPAYA Global
- Quora
- Quicknode
- Scribe
- SenseTime
- SoftBank Group
- Spotify
- Stripe
- strongDM
- The Viral Fever
- UiPath
- Waymo
- Yandex
