= Camargo Corrêa Desenvolvimento Imobiliário =

Camargo Corrêa Desenvolvimento Imobiliário S.A
- Company type: Private
- Industry: Real estate
- Founded: 1958; 68 years ago
- Headquarters: São Paulo, Brazil
- Key people: José Alberto Diniz de Oliveira, (Chairman); Francisco Sciarotta Neto, (CEO)
- Revenue: ▼US$507.2 million (2011)
- Net income: ▼ - US$103.2 million (2011)
- Number of employees: 2,000
- Parent: Mover Participações
- Subsidiaries: HM Engenharia
- Website: www.ccdi.com.br

CCDI (or Camargo Correa Desenvolvimento Imobiliario) is a Brazilian homebuilding and commercial real estate development company. It is part of the Mover Participações group (formerly known as Camargo Corrêa), a conglomerate of infrastructure sector companies in Brazil.

The firm went public in 01/31/07 and was traded at the Bovespa's Novo Mercado under the ticker symbol CCIM3 in 2012 the company was delisted. It has many Brazilian competitors such as PDG, Cyrela Brazil Realty, MRV Engenharia, Even, Rossi Residencial, Brookfield Incorporações, EZ Tec and many others.
