= CDCI =

CDCI may refer to:

- Community Development Capital Initiative, 2010 investment initiative under the U.S.' Troubled Asset Relief Program
- Cathay Drug Company Incorporated, Philippine pharmaceutical company
- Cobourg CDCI West (Cobourg District Collegiate Institute West), high school in Couburg, Ontario, Canada

== See also ==
- CCDI (disambiguation)
