= Tegra Incorporadora =

Brazilian homebuilder and real estate company

- Type: Subsidiary
- Industry: Real estate and Construction
- Founded: 2008
- Headquarters: Rio de Janeiro, Brazil
- Key people: Nicholas Vincent Reade, (Chairman); Ubirajara Freitas, (CEO)
- Products: House-building, Offices
- Revenue: ▼US$ 1.5 billion (2012)
- Net income: ▲ - US$ 189.3 million (2012)
- Number of employees: 6,001
- Parent: Brookfield Asset Management
- Website: https://www.tegraincorporadora.com.br/sp

Tegra Incorporadora is the fifth largest Brazilian homebuilder and real estate company, it is a subsidiary of Canadian Brookfield Asset Management. It was founded in 2008, through the merges of 3 Brazilian homebuilder companies being, Brascan, Company and MB Engenharia.

The company operates in the economic, mid-low, middle, mid-high and high-end segments of the residential development business, and in the commercial segment in eight Brazilian metropolitan areas, being São Paulo, Rio de Janeiro, Brasília, Goiânia, Campo Grande, Cuiabá, Curitiba and Campinas.

Brookfield Incorporações main competitors are Cyrela Brazil Realty, PDG, MRV Engenharia, Gafisa and Rossi Residencial which together form the top six of largest homebuilder companies in Brazil, but competes with smaller companies such as Even, CCDI, Eztec and others.
