= Even (company) =

Even Construtora e Incorporadora S.A.
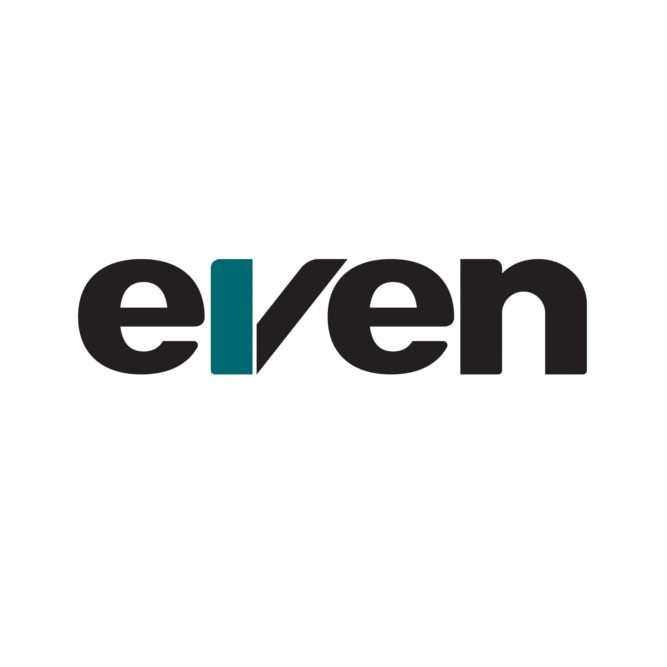
- Company type: Sociedade Anônima
- Traded as: B3: EVEN3
- Industry: Real estate and Construction
- Founded: 2002
- Headquarters: São Paulo, Brazil
- Key people: Marcio Moraes (CEO) Marcelo Dzik (CFO/Investor Relations Officer), Joao Eduardo Azevedo Silva (COO)
- Products: House-building
- Revenue: ▲BRL$ 2.318 billion (2022)
- Net income: ▲BRL$ 104.38 million (2022)
- Website: www.even.com.br

Even is a Brazilian construction and real estate company. It is listed on B3, the São Paulo Stock Exchange.

Even has operated in the real estate sector for more than 40 years and is one of the largest developers and builders in the São Paulo metropolitan area. It maintains a strategic focus on the cities of São Paulo, Rio de Janeiro and Porto Alegre.

The company has vertically integrated operations, executing all the development stages of its projects, from site prospecting, property development and brokerage activities to the project‘s construction. Even also have two brokerage companies: Even Vendas and Even More, both of which operate in 100% of the company‘s projects selling units and providing services exclusively for Even.

In 2018, Leandro Melnick became President and CEO of the company, and João Eduardo de Azevedo Silva stepped into the roles of Vice President and COO. After restructuring Even entered a new period of growth in 2023 under new CEO Marcio Moraes’ leadership, focused on higher-end real state in São Paulo.

Major competitors include: Cyrela Brazil Realty, Gafisa, Rossi Residencial, PDG Realty, Brookfield Incorporações, and MRV Engenharia.
