= Equity International =

- Type: Privately held company
- Industry: Private equity
- Founded: 1999; 27 years ago
- Founder: Sam Zell
- Headquarters: Chicago, Illinois, United States
- Key people: Tom Heneghan (CEO)
- Products: Investments in real estate
- Number of employees: 45
- Website: equityinternational.com

Equity International is an American private equity firm founded by Sam Zell to invest in real estate in markets outside of the United States. Since its founding in 1999, it has invested in 28 companies.

== History ==
The firm was founded in 1999 by Sam Zell.

In 2002, Equity International invested $32 million in Mexican home builder Homex. The firm divested from Homex in 2008.

In 2005, the firm made a $50 million investment in Brazilian property company Gafisa. In 2010, the firm sold a significant portion of its shares in Gafisa.

In 2006, the firm made its first investment in China, a $10 million investment in Xinyuan Real Estate, a Chinese homebuilder based in Zhengzhou. Xinyuan Real Estate became a public company via an initial public offering in 2007.

In 2008, the firm invested in Chinese logistics and warehousing company Shanghai Yupei Group. The investment was sold in 2011.

In 2011, the firm closed its 5th investment fund, with capital commitments of $650 million.

In 2016, the firm invested $125 million in Estapar Participações SA, an operator of parking lots in Brazil.

In 2017, the firm made a $29 million investment in Grupo Acosta Verde, a developer, owner, and manager of shopping centers in Mexico.

In March 2020, the firm announced an investment in Stanza Living, an Indian student housing and shared living operator.

In May 2023, Sam Zell died aged 81, the company continued operating using his principles for investments.
