= Blue Ridge Capital =

American hedge fund (1996–2017)

Blue Ridge Capital Holdings, LLC
- Type: Private
- Industry: Investment management
- Founded: 1996
- Founder: John Griffin
- Defunct: December 2017
- Headquarters: New York City, New York, U.S.
- Products: Hedge funds
- Total assets: $12.4 billion

Blue Ridge Capital was an American hedge fund founded in 1996 by John Griffin, a "Tiger Cub" (protégé of Julian Robertson's Tiger Management), which invested globally.

== Background ==
The founder of Blue Ridge Capital, John Griffin, is believed to have been a "right-hand man" to the billionaire money manager Julian Robertson. Blue Ridge Capital generally targeted "absolute returns" by investing in and short-selling companies, with a focus on "going long" (i.e. buying the stock of companies rather than selling it short.) Blue Ridge's investment thesis was based on fundamental analysis, and focused on companies that have competitive advantages in their industries, while shorting those thought to have "fundamental problems." The principal, Griffin, was highly compensated and after a 65% return on the fund in 2007 he reportedly made $625 million.

== Investment process ==
Blue Ridge has a lengthy process for vetting both long and short investments. Generally, they are focused on individual companies rather than a sector; a "checklist methodology" is used to identify good performers in a given category. Industry outlook is also taken into account in the investment process. Key factors in the consideration of industry-relevant matters are the power of stakeholders, barriers to market entries, ingredients of success, and business development opportunities. Analysts at Blue Ridge also need to address the business model, the management, the financial structure, and the risks of the company they're considering; a detailed time line is also created, which attempts to pin down catalysts for a changed valuation in the share price. A prospective investment must also be evaluated for the presence of questionable accounting practices.

== Joint ventures ==
In 2008, Blue Ridge Capital's division in China started a joint venture with Equity International investing in Xinyuan Real Estate. In December 2007, Xinyuan Real Estate went public on the NYSE as an ADR ticker symbol XIN. It traded slightly above $15 per share but settled between $1–$3.

== Political activities ==
Blue Ridge donated $100,000 to Restore Our Future, the Super PAC supporting Mitt Romney's presidential candidacy.

== Closure ==
Griffin shut Blue Ridge Capital in December 2017.
