= RKO Keith's Theater (Flushing, Queens) =

Former movie theater in Queens, New York

- U.S. National Register of Historic Places
- New York State Register of Historic Places
- New York City Landmark
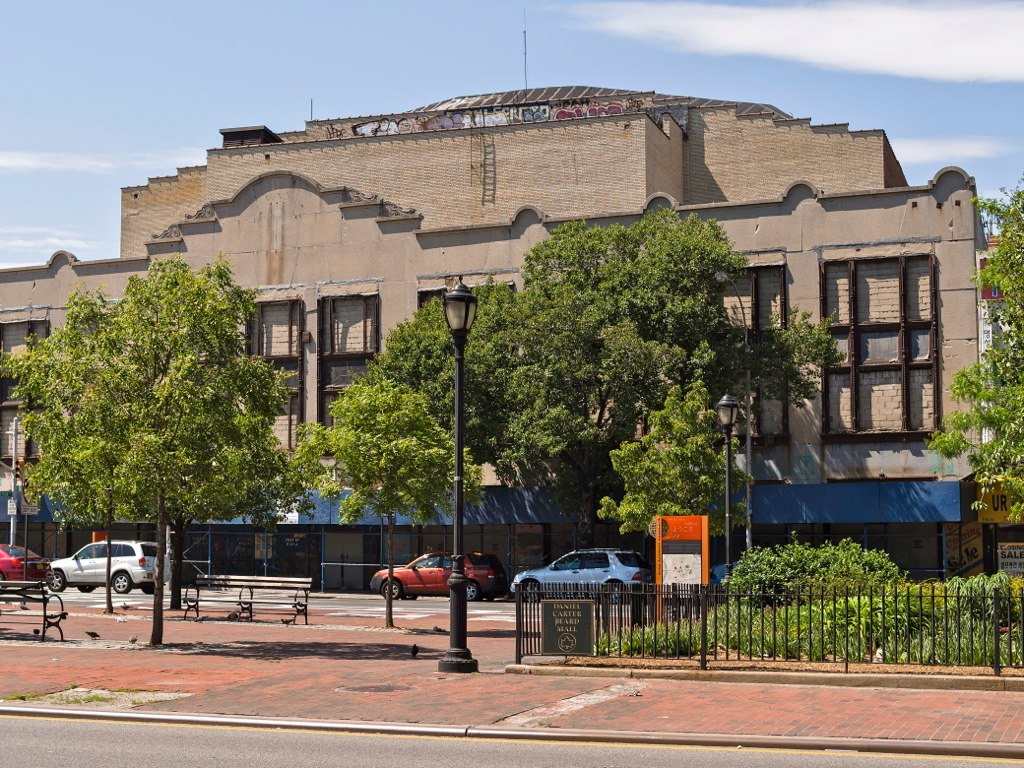
- Location: 135-35 Northern Blvd., Flushing, New York
- Coordinates: 40°45′48″N 73°49′55″W
- Area: less than one acre
- Built: 1928
- Architect: Thomas W. Lamb
- Architectural style: Mission/Spanish Revival
- NRHP reference No.: 82001260
- NYSRHP No.: 08101.006411
- NYCL No.: 1257

Significant dates
- Added to NRHP: October 29, 1982
- Designated NYSRHP: June 18, 1982
- Designated NYCL: February 28, 1984

The RKO Keith's Theater was an RKO Pictures movie theater at 135-35 Northern Boulevard in the Flushing neighborhood of Queens in New York City. It was designed by architect Thomas W. Lamb and built in 1928. While the RKO Keith's had a plain three-story facade, its interior was elaborately designed in a Spanish Baroque Revival style. The theater had a square ticket lobby and an oval grand foyer, which led to the double-level auditorium. The auditorium was designed as an atmospheric theater with a blue ceiling and gilded-plaster decorations; it contained 2,974 seats across two levels. There were also four lounges and a mezzanine promenade.

The theater was developed by Benjamin Franklin Keith and Edward Albee of the Keith–Albee vaudeville circuit, which bought the site in 1927. The Keith–Albee Theater, as it was known, opened on Christmas Day 1928 and originally operated as a vaudeville theater. In the 1930s, the theater was renamed the RKO Keith's and began showing movies. The theater continued to prosper after World War II in spite of a decline in New York City's large neighborhood movie palaces during that time. It began to decline in the 1960s and was eventually divided into a three-screen multiplex in 1977. The RKO Keith's was added to the National Register of Historic Places in 1982. The New York City Landmarks Preservation Commission (LPC) designated most of the theater as a New York City interior landmark in 1984, but the New York City Board of Estimate curtailed the LPC's designation to cover only the ticket lobby and grand foyer.

Despite the landmark designations, the RKO Keith's closed after local developer Thomas Huang acquired the theater in 1986. Over the next three decades, it went through several efforts at redevelopment. After the theater was partially destroyed in 1987, Huang was forced to stop work on his project, and work stalled for over a decade. During this time, the RKO Keith's interior continued to deteriorate, and residents and politicians raised concerns over Huang's treatment of the theater. The RKO Keith's was sold to Shaya Boymelgreen in 2002, then to Patrick Thompson in 2010 and Jerry Karlik in 2014; all three men unsuccessfully tried to redevelop the site. After Chinese developers Xinyuan Real Estate bought the theater in 2016, most of the theater was finally demolished from 2020 to 2021. Xinyuan made plans to replace the theater with a condominium development, which would preserve the theater's ticket lobby and grand foyer.

== Description ==
The RKO Keith's Theater was at 135-35 Northern Boulevard, at the intersection with Main Street, in the Flushing neighborhood of Queens in New York City. The site, at the northern end of Main Street, is near Flushing's central business district. As of 2020, most of the theater was being demolished and replaced with 269 condominium apartments, developed by Xinyuan Real Estate. The ticket lobby and grand foyer were temporarily removed and are planned to be reinstalled in the condominium development's lobby.

The theater was designed by architect Thomas W. Lamb in a Spanish Baroque Revival style and opened in 1928. The RKO Keith's was originally conceived as a venue for vaudeville, which in the late 1920s was competing with films; as a result, the design was more elaborate than that of older theaters. The building's facade on Northern Boulevard was relatively plain, with a curved marquee facing Main Street (later replaced with a horizontal advertising board). The ground story had storefronts, while the other stories had a brown facade, with marble spandrel panels between the second- and third-story windows. Inside, a ticket lobby and grand foyer led to the double-level auditorium. Four lounges also existed in the theater: two from the ground-level foyer and two from a mezzanine promenade below the auditorium's balcony. The interior was ornately decorated in plaster and wood.

=== Ticket lobby and grand foyer ===
The ticket lobby is a double-height space, square in plan. The room measures 4,000 ft^{2} (370 m^{2}). Along with the grand foyer, it is the only part of the theater that is preserved. Originally, there was a ticket booth at ground level. The ceiling, of flat plaster painted blue, is supported by carved columns, designed in the Spanish Baroque Revival style. As of 2017, plans call for a retail elevator vestibule to be built east of the ticket lobby, with two elevators. A circular stair, leading up to retail spaces on the mezzanine level, will also be built east of the ticket lobby. A sloped glass facade will be installed in the base of the condominium building, overlooking the ticket lobby.

The grand foyer is also a double-height space, oval in plan; it measures 75 ft (23 m) wide. There was originally a marble fountain at the center of the grand foyer. Live goldfish swam in the fountain, which was topped by a sculpture of Cupid flanked by dolphins. This fountain was subsequently replaced by a candy concession stand. The east wall of the grand foyer contains a terracotta drinking fountain with polychrome tiles. The north wall contained gilded plaster doorways to the auditorium's orchestra level; these doorways were sealed by the 1980s. The 2017 plans for the site call for a mail room and a residential lobby with three elevators to be built behind these doorways. The ceiling was also painted blue and had an arched vault.

Staircases, decorated with bronze balustrades, flank the grand foyer and run between the ground story and mezzanine level. The tops of those staircases formerly led to the mezzanine promenade behind the auditorium. At the foyer's second story is an arcade supported by spiral columns. Behind the arcade was the mezzanine promenade, which was rectangular in plan. The promenade had spiral columns with Moorish-style arches, as well as wrought iron furniture. The wooden ceiling was carved; chandeliers made of cut glass were suspended from the promenade's ceiling. Further staircases and passageways connected the mezzanine promenade to the auditorium's balcony. The 2017 plans indicate that the mezzanine promenade will be replaced with a residential promenade, leading to the elevator lobby.

=== Auditorium ===
The auditorium contained 2,974 seats across an orchestra level and a balcony. It was designed as an atmospheric theater, a type of movie palace in which projectors, architectural elements, and ornamentation were used to evoke a sense of being outdoors. It was one of Lamb's only atmospheric theater designs, as well as one of seven atmospheric theaters in New York City and one of 34 nationwide. (Note: The others are the Valencia, Triboro, 72nd Street, Pitkin, Paradise, and Brooklyn Paramount.) The RKO Keith's auditorium was designed to give the feeling that the audience was in a garden, with Baroque, Gothic, and Moorish ornament in the style of Spanish architect J. M. de Churriguera. The balcony level protruded substantially, nearly reaching the proscenium opening in front of the auditorium. This was characteristic of vaudeville theaters, where the proximity of the audience to the stage was an important factor. The underside of the balcony had cut-glass chandeliers, which hung from panels shaped like eight-pointed stars.

The rear wall had an arcade of round arches with double columns. Each column was designed to resemble spirals made of leather and was topped by a capital depicting an angel's or a baby's face. The side and front walls had wooden screens and gilded plaster walls, which wrapped around to the proscenium. The wooden screens were decorated with arcades and broken pediments. The finials atop each screen reached the ceiling; these finials were designed to resemble a "romantic outline" against a sky. At the center of each screen was a mural within an opening of three arches, supported by spiral columns. Each mural panel was intended to symbolize a Spanish facade. These murals were flanked by gilded plaster walls with indirect lighting. The side walls also had doorways to exit halls, flanked by spiral columns.

The proscenium arch was made of wood and plaster and was supported by large piers on either side. At the top of each pier was a niche containing an urn. The top of the proscenium had a niche at its center, as well as a Baroque-style broken pediment with an urn. There were also organ screens next to each of the proscenium's piers. The screens had decorative detail such as spiral columns and niches. The screens surrounded a Wurlitzer organ, Opus 1975, which had 3 manuals and 15 ranks; the organ was donated to the College of the Ozarks in 1969.

In the theater's heyday, the auditorium's plaster ceiling was painted dark blue, and light bulbs were embedded in the ceiling to evoke the appearance of stars. When a film was being screened, projectors displayed images of clouds and stars onto the ceiling. In later years, ventilation grates were placed in the ceiling. At the RKO Keith's opening in 1928, Kelcey Allen of Women's Wear Daily said the ceiling was "a triumph of artistic illusion and ethereal atmospheric suggestions".

=== Lounges ===
The theater contained four lounges, all designed in the Spanish or Mexican Baroque style. To the east of the grand foyer was a small space with a drinking fountain, plaster walls, and an overhanging lamp. This small space led to the ground-level men's lounge, which was square in plan. The floor was tiled, while the walls were decorated with moldings of gilded plaster. Each corner also had niches flanked by spiral columns. On one wall was a fireplace with a large hood; there were lighting sconces on either side of the fireplace. The 2017 plans call for the ground-level men's lounge to be converted to retail and mechanical space.

To the west of the grand foyer was a marble staircase with iron handrails, which led to a circular ground-level women's lounge. The floor was covered with carpets, while the walls were decorated with moldings of gilded plaster. The walls also had niches with gilded plaster surrounds. One section of the wall had a fireplace with a large hood. The plaster ceiling contained moldings, designed to resemble twisting vines. The 2017 plans call for the ground-level women's lounge to be converted to retail.

There were two lounges directly adjacent to the mezzanine promenade, directly above the ground-floor lounges. The women's lounge was to the east and the men's lounge was to the west; this was the opposite arrangement from the ground-floor lounges. In both lounges, a wrought-iron chandelier was hung from the wooden ceiling, and there were fireplaces with hoods. The fireplace in the women's lounge was next to an arched window overlooking the foyer. An arched doorway also led from the women's lounge to a restroom. Plans from 2017 indicate that the women's lounge will be replaced by a fitness center, while the men's lounge will be replaced by residential amenity space. South of these will be retail spaces.

== Use as movie palace ==
Movie palaces became common in the 1920s, between the end of World War I and the beginning of the Great Depression. In the New York City area, only a small number of operators were involved in the construction of movie palaces. These theaters' designers included the legitimate-theater architects Thomas W. Lamb, C. Howard Crane, and John Eberson, the latter of whom popularized the atmospheric theater. Furthermore, in the 1920s, the dominant vaudeville circuit on the East Coast of the United States was the Keith–Albee circuit, composed of Benjamin Franklin Keith and Edward Albee.

=== Development and early years ===
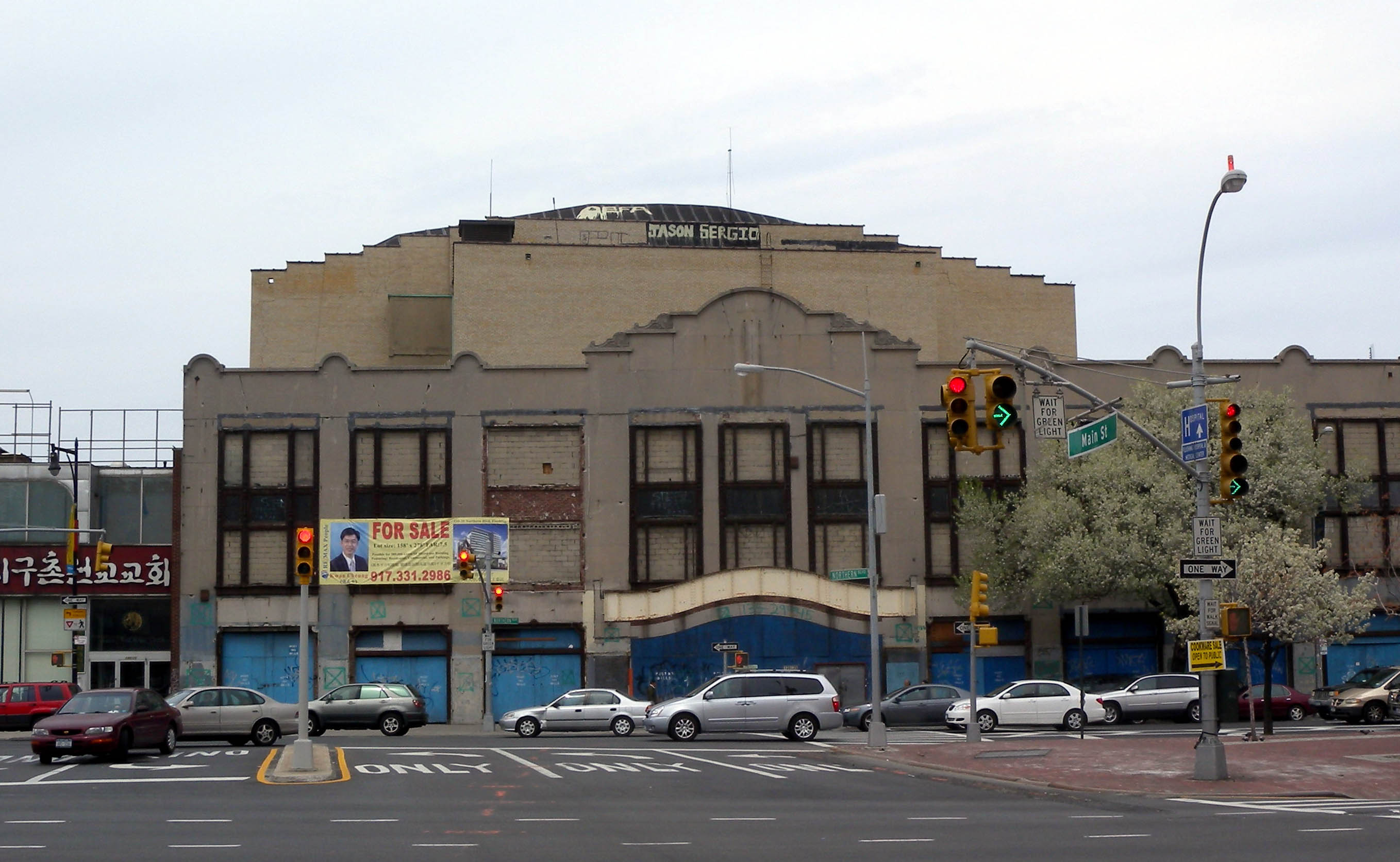
RKO Keith's Theater as seen in April 2009

In May 1926, the Keith–Albee circuit announced that it planned to build three theaters in New York City as part of a nationwide expansion program, including one venue in Flushing, Queens. The Flushing theater and several others in the expansion program were planned to be funded by a $25 million bond issue. The following year, the Keith–Albee circuit bought a site at the northern end of Main Street, at the intersection with Northern Boulevard. The circuit then hired Thomas W. Lamb to design a 2,974-seat movie theater and vaudeville house for $750,000. He filed plans for the theater with the Queens Bureau of Buildings in May 1927. Lamb designed the Keith–Albee venue in Flushing as an atmospheric theater, following Eberson's example. The Keith–Albee circuit merged at the end of the year with the Orpheum Circuit, which dominated West Coast vaudeville, and the Flushing theater became part of the Keith-Albee-Orpheum (KAO) circuit. At the time of the merger, films were directly competing with vaudeville.

The theater was originally projected to be completed by August 1928 but was ultimately completed that December. It opened on December 25, 1928, as a vaudeville house called the Keith–Albee Theater. There were 11 acts during the first week, including a Pathé News newsreel and an organ performance of "Hello, Flushing" by Bernie Cowham. The theater's operators originally sold subscriptions for each season, and patrons had to reserve seats, similar to in Broadway theaters. Many stars performed at the theater, including Bob Hope, Jack Benny and the Marx Brothers, Judy Garland, Mae West, Milton Berle, Jimmy Durante, and Jerry Lewis. As at other KAO theaters, vaudeville acts at the Flushing theater could only perform with a musical accompaniment with KAO's permission.

When the theater opened, the surrounding section of Flushing was rapidly growing into a residential and commercial hub. By February 1930, the theater hosted performances twice a day and often played to a full house. Following further mergers, KAO became part of Radio-Keith-Orpheum, subsequently RKO Pictures. In September 1930, less than two years after the Flushing theater opened, RKO renamed the venue from the Keith–Albee to the Keith's. Some time in the 1930s, the theater switched to screening movies nearly exclusively. The theater was also used for high school graduation ceremonies and beauty competitions.

=== Use as movie palace ===
RKO reorganized its operations into eight subdivisions in March 1934, and the Flushing theater was assigned to RKO's New York Senior Metropolitan Division. In addition to films, the theater hosted children's programs in the late 1930s. Some vaudeville features continued at the Flushing theater through the end of that decade, but they tended to charge very low admission. RKO managers changed their policy for screening double features (where patrons could see two films for one ticket price) at the Flushing Keith's in 1941. After this change, the more popular feature was typically screened at 9 p.m., while the less popular feature was shown later, so patrons could leave early if they did not want to see the second feature. RKO briefly tried to revive vaudeville at the Flushing theater and its other neighborhood venues in the early 1940s. For example, the B. F. Keith's Oldtime Vaudeville Revue performed there in February 1942, and Ink Spots and Tiny Bradshaw appeared that December as part of a tour.

Following another reorganization of RKO theaters, Louis Goldberg took over operation of the Flushing Keith's and several other theaters in 1943. The Flushing theater also continued to host some productions for children in the late 1940s. The Flushing Keith's continued to prosper after World War II in spite of a decline in New York City's large neighborhood movie palaces during that time. Many such theaters in Manhattan were demolished, but those in the outer boroughs were generally either divided into smaller complexes or outright abandoned. In 1951, many of the seats were replaced; the new seats were spaced further apart than the theater's original seats. The theater's outer lobby was damaged in a car crash in 1955, when a driver on Main Street died of a heart attack while driving; two patrons were killed in the crash.

Live performances continued in later years, such as in 1965 when Hollywood stars Cesar Romero and Connie Stevens performed at the Flushing Keith's. Flushing had started to decline by the late 1960s, and the theater's success decreased with it. The theater's owners renovated the auditorium around 1976, turning the RKO Keith's into a multiplex with three screens. The lower level had two screens while the balcony level contained the third screen; these spaces were separated by partitions. Surviving into the 1980s intact, RKO Keith's was one of New York City's few remaining atmospheric theaters.

=== Preservation ===
The New York City Landmarks Preservation Commission (LPC) considered designating the theater's interior as a landmark in 1981 but took no action at the time. The next year, developer Lawrence Gresser proposed redeveloping the theater into a shopping mall. Many local residents opposed the plans and, in February 1982, the National Trust for Historic Preservation gave the New York Landmarks Conservancy a $3,000 grant for the preservation of the theater's interior, provided the Landmarks Conservancy could raise matching funds. The theater was added to the National Register of Historic Places in 1982. The project was redesigned that August into an office complex, but residents still opposed it. Fred Ferretti of The New York Times wrote in 1983 that the RKO Keith's remained "one of the city's great theaters", despite its subdivision and the uncertainty over the theater's fate.

The LPC designated the interior as a landmark in February 1984, citing it as "one of the few surviving examples in New York of the uniquely American institution of the movie palace". The New York City Planning Commission endorsed the designation. The New York City Board of Estimate then had to review the landmark status for ratification in June 1984, (Note: If the Board of Estimate took no action, the LPC's designation would be approved by default.) though the board deferred a decision on the designation for a month. Queens borough president Donald Manes, a member of the Board of Estimate, overturned the designation for the auditorium interior in July 1984, leaving only the foyer and ticket lobby protected. This left the main portion of the theater vulnerable to redevelopment. Manes had overturned six landmark designations in Queens over the past several years. The RKO Keith's landmark status was unusual in that neither the exterior nor the main portion of the interior was protected. Typically, most landmarked interiors in New York City were inside buildings whose exteriors were also landmarks, such as the Empire State Building, the Chrysler Building, and Grand Central Terminal.

== Closure and abandonment ==
=== Huang ownership ===
By the 1980s, Flushing's white population was moving out, while its Asian population grew drastically, particularly in Flushing's Chinatown. In 1985, local developer Thomas Huang acquired some vacant land next to the RKO Keith's with the intention of developing an office building there. Huang then acquired the RKO Keith's for $3.4 million. Huang, a Taiwanese-American developer who had turned Flushing into "New York's second Chinatown" over the preceding decade, intended to repurpose the theater as an office building or a shopping complex. Huang had been an ally of Manes, who had died in early 1986. After the RKO Keith's was closed following Labor Day in 1986, downtown Flushing did not receive another movie theater for 35 years. Residents expressed concerns over Huang's acquisition of the theater, as he had publicly announced plans to demolish the auditorium. Huang said the theater was "a junk building"; he had to erect sidewalk sheds on Northern Boulevard because part of the facade had begun to fall off.

==== Partial demolition of lobby ====
A group called the Committee to Save the RKO Keith's Theatre of Flushing, Inc., worked to gain community support as part of its goal to maintain and preserve RKO Keith's Theater for adaptive reuse as a performing arts/convention center. In 1986 and 1987, over 3,000 Queens residents signed petitions in order to request that the entire structure become a city landmark. The petitions were submitted to Borough President Claire Shulman, who refused to support landmark status for the entire interior. The Committee gained support from the Theater Historical Society, Queens Historical Society, New York Landmarks Conservancy, Queensborough Preservation League, and State Senator Frank Padavan. The Queens Historical Society wrote a letter to the organization's founder, Jerry Rotondi, saying, "The Committee's work to protect a recognized landmark from insensitive development and inappropriate use... [is] very commendable."

In January 1987, Huang started remodeling the facade into storefronts and adding offices to the upper floors. The theater was by then owned by the Farrington & Northern Development Corporation, where Huang was the vice president. The LPC gave him a construction permit for the site. Inspectors subsequently discovered that the lobby had been illegally modified, resulting in $160,000 worth of damage. Early that March, after most of the auditorium had been demolished, the New York City Department of Buildings issued an order demanding that Huang stop all work on the theater. The stop-work order came after the inspectors found that three of the landmarked columns in the ticket lobby had been destroyed. The construction permit was also revoked. Huang claimed that vandals broke into the theater building on February 23, 1987, and destroyed the columns. Demolition contractor Steven Shapiro said he had reported the vandalism to the New York City Police Department (NYPD)'s 109th Precinct, but the NYPD had no record of such a report being made.

The LPC could not ascertain who destroyed the columns, so it did not issue any fines or violations. However, the LPC did find in October 1987 that the contractors violated building codes because the construction plan for the site had not been approved. Additionally, the LPC removed the auditorium from consideration as a landmark since most of it was already destroyed. The stop-work order remained in place for the next several years.

==== Further deterioration ====
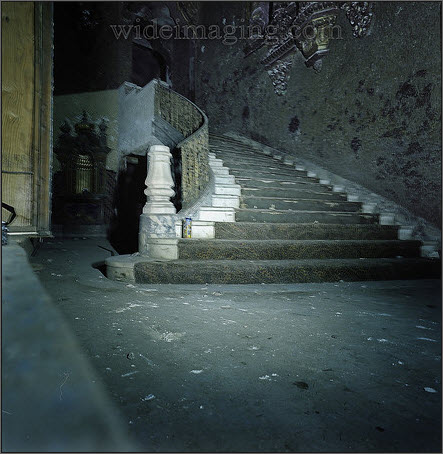
The deteriorating condition of the East Stairway in the grand foyer

At the start of 1989, two sets of bronze doors were stolen from the theater along with their frames, and Rotondi requested a thorough inspection after realizing that someone had penetrated the wooden barrier surrounding the theater. Preservationist Richard McTighe and Huang decided that a gate should be erected to separate the landmarked interior from the rest of the site. Meanwhile, Huang had stopped paying taxes on the theater after being forced to stop work there. By October 1989, he owed $161,000 in taxes to the city and was in danger of losing the RKO Keith's. Huang said he would not sell the theater even though it was rundown. Huang requested the city government's permission to redevelop the site into an office building in February 1990 but withdrew his application shortly afterwards. Huang indicated the next month that he wanted to sell the theater. Local residents started a petition to preserve the theater, which garnered 3,500 signatures. A fire was set inside the empty theater that July. Though local media accused Huang of wrongdoing, Huang denied the accusations against him.

More issues arose in December 1990, when the city's buildings department fined Huang $3,250 for building-code violations at the theater. Despite the fact that the LPC's preservation rules were among the strictest in the United States, the damage to the lobby was not fixed for several years. A local civic group, Coalition for a Planned Flushing, said that the LPC's failure to designate the entire theater as a landmark had reduced its chances of restoration. A preservation group found that, from the 1965 creation of the city's landmarks law to 1990, the Board of Estimate had overturned or modified 21 landmark designations. Of these, the RKO Keith's was one of only five landmarks that had been significantly altered or destroyed afterward. (Note: The other four designations were the Bronx Borough Hall and the Triboro Theater, which were both demolished, as well as the Lalance Grosjean factory in Queens and the Walker Theater in Brooklyn, which were both significantly altered.) In March 1993, the LPC mandated that Huang keep $40,000 in an escrow account for the theater's restoration. Huang filed for bankruptcy in 1993 and transferred ownership of the theater building the next year to his mother's company, Yeh Realty (later RKO Delaware).

Residents and local politicians accused Huang of letting the theater deteriorate and selling off part of the theater's decoration, but Huang blamed the damage on vandalism. Huang also filed a lawsuit against the city's government because he wished to develop seven storefronts along the Northern Boulevard portion of the site. The city and Huang tentatively agreed to a settlement in which Huang could develop four storefronts, but he had to also restore the lobby to obtain a certificate of occupancy for the storefronts. As the exterior was not protected, the LPC could not force Huang to preserve the facade. Huang again requested permission to redevelop the RKO Keith's site at a hearing with the LPC in July 1996. At the time, city inspectors had found that up to 10,000 U.S. gal (38,000 L; 8,300 imp gal) of fuel had leaked into the basement. As a result, the LPC denied his request. Huang promised to remediate the theater's environmental issues but then ignored the order.

==== Criminal charges and lawsuit ====
Early in 1997, the city government said it would consider Huang's request for a certificate of occupancy if he and the city agreed to hire a third-party architect or engineer to oversee the work. Local officials proposed that the state government charge Huang with racketeering so the state could seize the theater through criminal forfeiture. Huang was arrested in March 1997 and charged with environmental violations in relation to the RKO Keith's after city officials discovered that he had lied about cleaning up the oil leak in the theater. Huang placed the theater for sale that June, and he unsuccessfully attempted to dismiss the environmental charges against him. By the end of the year, the office of the Attorney General of New York proposed an agreement in which Huang would stabilize the theater and allow a city inspection in exchange for not going to prison.

In January 1998, a judge for the New York Supreme Court, the state's trial court, postponed Huang's criminal trial by a year after Huang's lawyers claimed that he could not get a fair trial in Queens. The postponement was criticized by Huang's opponents, such as state senator Leonard P. Stavisky, who said, "Justice delayed is justice denied." The New York Daily News said: "The RKO Keith's Theatre can only be described today as a ghostly shell." That March, Huang and the city made an agreement to allow city inspectors to check the theater's interior. The agreement included hiring an independent monitor to review the repairs; in addition, Huang had to file a plan for asbestos removal with the DOB. A local task force hosted a meeting in November 1998 to determine the theater's future, but city officials did not attend the meeting because it was open to the public.

Huang pleaded guilty in January 1999 to lying about having cleaned up the leak in the theater. The next month, a Supreme Court judge fined Huang $5,000 for environmental violations at the RKO Keith's and sentenced him to five years of probation. Huang's opponents saw the sentence as lenient, given that the developer had faced up to $100,000 in fines and four years in prison. Huang sued the LPC and the DOB for $39 million in May 2000, alleging that the agencies continued to delay the theater's redevelopment. He dropped his lawsuit in December 2001 and consented to spending $40,000 on repairing the lobby and auditorium the following March. By October 2002, Huang was negotiating to sell the building. The media subsequently reported that Shaya Boymelgreen of Boymelgreen Developers was negotiating to buy the building for $12 million. By then, the planks in front of the theater had been removed.

=== Boymelgreen, Thompson, and Karlik plans ===
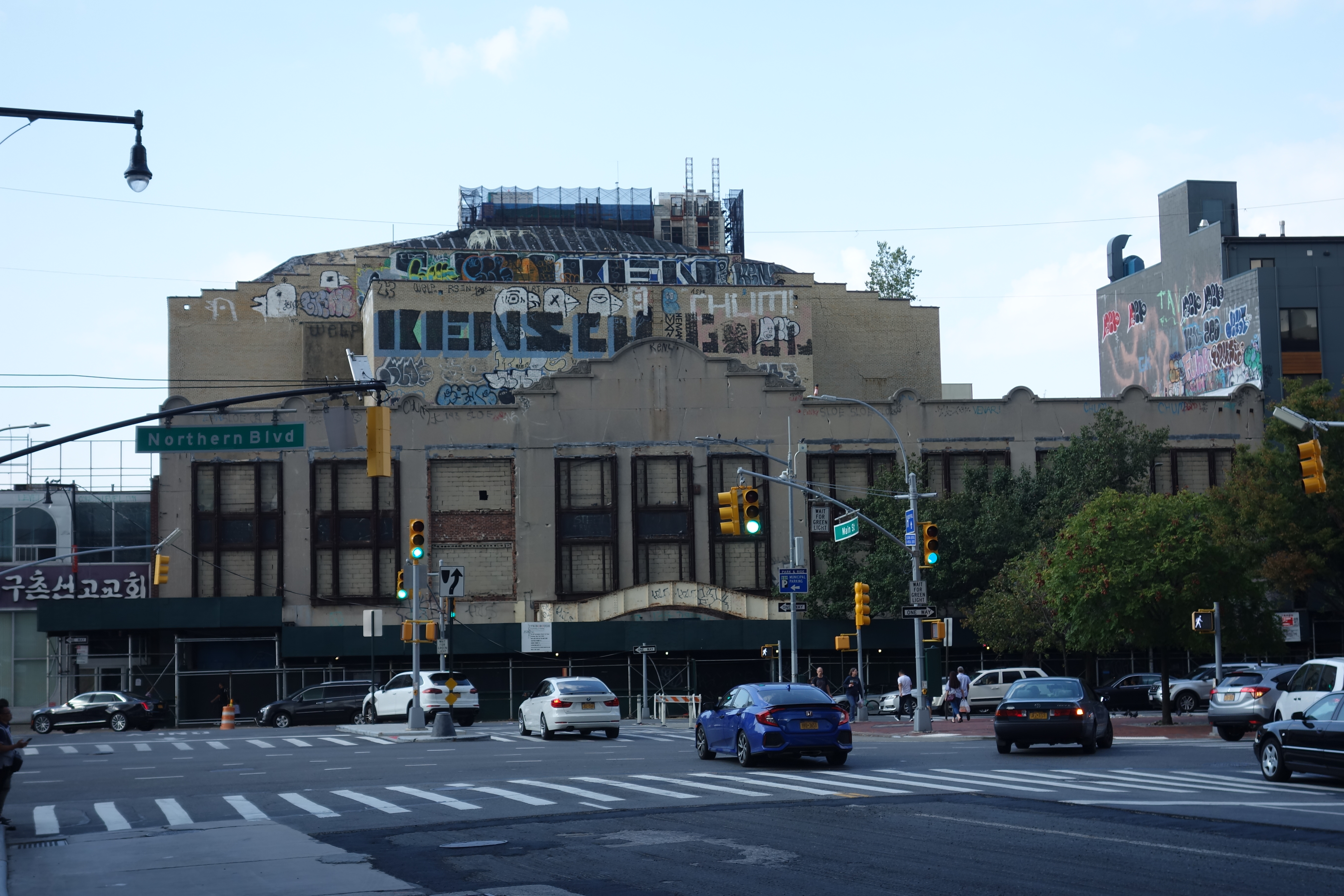
The theater as seen from Main Street. After being abandoned, the theater building was covered extensively with graffiti.

Huang sold the theater in 2002 to Boymelgreen, who planned to build the RKO Plaza, a mixed-use development with apartments, retail, restaurants, and a senior center; the ticket lobby and foyer would be preserved. As part of the $100 million project, Boymelgreen would demolish the facade and build a curving glass wall in front of the lobby and foyer. This came after an engineering study found that the auditorium was "so devastated that little of it can be saved". A hole behind the proscenium arch exposed the auditorium to the outdoors, and plaster and paint were peeling off the walls and ceilings. Glenn Collins of The New York Times characterized the theater as "a Sistine Chapel for connoisseurs of decay". In February 2004, members of Queens Community Board 7 voted against granting Boymelgreen an exemption to the zoning regulations to enable the addition of condominiums in the RKO Plaza. The next year, Community Board 7 approved a revised plan, which was narrower and was set back further from Northern Boulevard. The project, as approved, would have contained 200 condominium apartments, along with 229 parking spaces.

In 2007, Boymelgreen and his development partner Lev Leviev decided to stop working together, and Boymelgreen put the RKO Keith's site for sale. Eastern Consolidated was originally hired as the broker. Real estate brokerage Massey Knakal had taken over the listing by May 2008, seeking $31 million for the site. Preservationists sought to purchase the RKO Keith's Theater in 2009 in the hopes of reusing or renovating it as a performing arts center. The theater was valued at $24 million. In order to fully revitalize the theater, Friends of RKO Keith's sought to collect donations from various film stars. Jon Favreau was one such actor who the group hoped would make a donation, since he once worked there. By late 2009, Venator Capital was planning to buy the mortgage on the theater from Boymelgreen's lender, Doral Bank, for $20 million. Preservationists held a fundraiser for the theater in early 2010.

Doral took over ownership of the theater and sold it in May 2010 to developer Patrick Thompson for $20 million. Thompson planned to restore the lobby and build condominiums and a senior center behind it. The next January, Thompson filed an application with the New York City Board of Standards and Appeals to increase the proposed project to 357 condos and 360 parking spaces. Though the city approved Thompson's plans in July 2011, the Federal Aviation Administration (FAA) said the next month that the development's height might interfere with planes landing at the nearby LaGuardia Airport. The FAA concluded in October 2011 that the new development had to be reduced by four stories and approved a revised plan the following May. The theater had accumulated $400,000 in unpaid taxes by March 2012, as Thompson had not paid taxes for 14 months. Thompson was reportedly looking to sell the theater by that time, but he was able to reduce his delinquent tax bill over the next several months.

Jerry Karlik of JK Equities bought the theater in 2013 for $30 million. Karlik wished to downsize the project to 269 condos and reduce the number of parking spaces in the basement. In addition, Karlik wished to redesign the curtain wall in front of the lobby and increase the building's height to accommodate mechanical space. By February 2016, Karlik had placed the building for sale again after JK Equities canceled plans to redevelop the RKO Keith's site. The previous developers had received a tax exemption for the site, which was also included in the sale. Graffiti artists had covered many parts of the abandoned theater, and its windows had been sealed with boards or bricks.

=== Xinyuan ownership ===
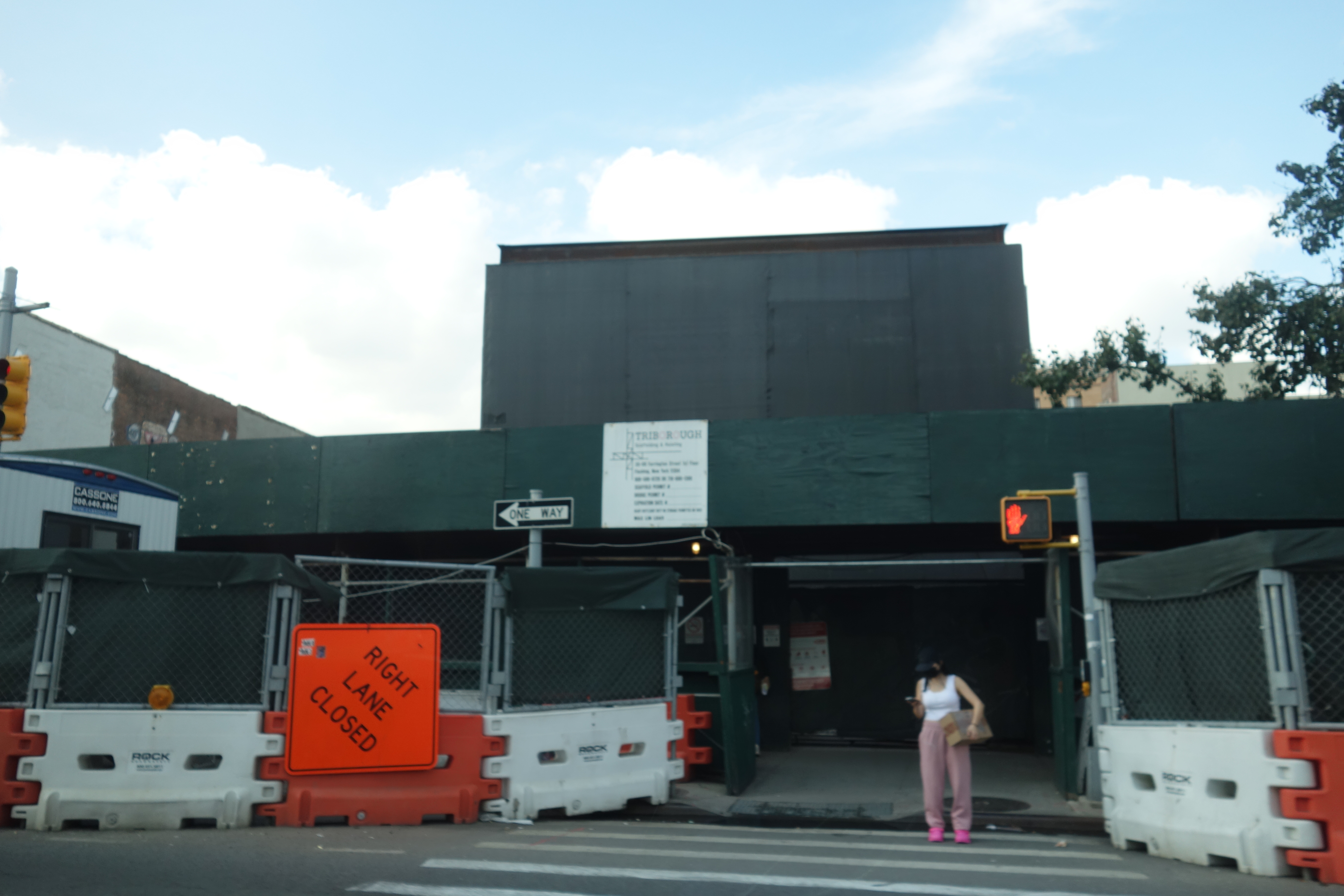
Demolition of the theater in October 2021

Chinese developer Xinyuan Real Estate bought the theater in August 2016 for $66 million. Xinyuan announced that it would build a 16-story luxury condominium tower in the space, with 269 residential units and no hotel rooms. The new building, which would keep the original facade over the lower floors, would be designed by Pei Cobb Freed & Partners. The LPC approved Xinyuan's plans for the theater's redevelopment in May 2017, including a proposal to convert the ticket lobby and foyer into a condo entrance. The Historic Districts Council expressed reservations that, while the ticket lobby would be open to the public, the grand foyer was planned to be restricted to residents, at least initially. This violated New York City's landmark preservation law, which mandated that landmarked interiors be accessible to the public. Following the announcement of Xinyuan's revised plans, preservationist and Forest Hills resident Richard Thornhill started a petition to restore the theater to Lamb's original design. The petition received 4,400 signatures.

Gerner Kronick and Valcarcel Architects took over the design process in 2019, discarding Pei Cobb Freed's original design. Subsequently, EverGreene Architectural Arts took apart the lobby's decorations and moved them to a warehouse for future installation in the new building. Xinyuan presented its plans for the redevelopment of RKO Keith's to Queens Community Board 7 members in February 2019. That May, Madison Realty Corporation loaned Xinyuan $30 million for the RKO site's redevelopment. Xinyuan submitted a new proposal for the site in August 2020, which called for hotel rooms in the new building. Members of Community Board 7 rejected the plans, citing the fact that seven hotels already existed nearby and that hotel traffic would worsen traffic congestion at Northern Boulevard and Main Street. The updated plans did include 35,000 ft^{2} (3,300 m^{2}) of community space and a restaurant. The demolition of the theater began the same year. By July 2021, most of the old theater had been demolished. Maverick Real Estate Partners, which had acquired Madison Realty's loan, indicated in July 2023 that it would foreclose on the site after Xinyuan defaulted on its real estate taxes.

== See also ==
- List of New York City Designated Landmarks in Queens
- National Register of Historic Places listings in Queens
- RKO Keith's Theater (Richmond Hill, Queens)
- RKO Keith's Theater (Boston)
