= Rossi Residencial =

Brazilian construction company

Rossi Residencial S.A
- Company type: Sociedade Anônima
- Traded as: B3: RSID3
- Industry: Construction & Real estate
- Founded: 1992; 34 years ago
- Headquarters: São Paulo, Brazil
- Area served: Brazil
- Key people: João Rossi Cuppoloni (Chairman), Heitor Cantergiani (CEO)
- Products: House-building, house selling
- Revenue: ▲US$ 902.2 million (2012)
- Net income: ▲US$ 17.3 million (2013)
- Website: www.rossiresidencial.com.br

Rossi Residencial is a Brazilian construction and real estate company. As of 2013 it was the sixth largest Brazilian residential construction company, after its big competitors such as PDG, Cyrela Brazil Realty, MRV and Brookfield Incorporações.

The company also operates in real estate. It has presence in more than 56 Brazilian cities, from headquarters in São Paulo and in regional offices located in cities such as Campinas, Porto Alegre, Rio de Janeiro, Belo Horizonte and others.

Rossi Residencial is part of the Rossi Group, founded in 1913, today the 4th generation of the Rossi family, one of the leading groups of engineering, construction and incorporation of Brazil, which over its history of cooperating with the development of the country not only through the engineering, but also in other areas.

The Rossi takes part in all phases of a real estate venture. Exploration of the land to the project, construction for sale, by delivery of property.

== History ==
=== 1990s ===
The beginning of its operations were aimed at the middle and lower classes. It was Rossi's creative response to the housing finance problem that made it difficult for the middle class to buy real estate. About 14,166 units were delivered throughout Brazil. In 1994, the inauguration of the regional CAMPINAS took place. São Paulo's activity then became regional SÃO PAULO.

By utilizing basic finishing materials and ensuring the quality and style of the venture, Rossi delivered 5,241 units geared to the economy segment in 1996. In 1997, Rossi raised $100 million for business expansion by issuing shares on the BM & FBOVESPA and ADRs on the New York Stock Exchange.

The inauguration of a new housing concept for the economic segment, with complete infrastructure with landscaping, sewage treatment plant, squares, parks, shopping center, chapel, day care center, school, club and police station occurred in 1999. There was also the launch of the regional SOUTH, based in Porto Alegre. The SAP business management system was implemented.

=== Early 2000s ===
In order to reinforce its activities with the public with the highest purchasing power, Rossi acquires América Properties, which specializes in the construction of high standard residential and commercial real estate.

In 2003, Rossi raised $80 million in the capital market. The same year, the Rio de Janeiro location was opened.

With the entry into the Novo Mercado in 2006, Rossi expanded Tag Along to 100%, offering a greater degree of protection and transparency to its shareholders. Rossi also received funding of R $1.012 billion, enabling the purchase of new land, the payment of debt, and the working capital of new projects. BRASILIA, based in the Federal District, was opened in 2006.

In 2007, the northeastern regional location based in Salvador opened. The OESTE regional office based in São José do Rio Preto also opened to operate in São Paulo and northern Paraná. Rossi Vendas, its sales team, was launched in 2007, with the objective of guaranteeing a quality service and a high degree of commitment.

In 2008, Rossi's shares became part of the IBovespa portfolio. The Bovespa Index is the most important indicator of the average performance of Brazilian stock market quotations, as it reflects the behavior of the main securities traded on the BM & FBOVESPA.

Rossi Ideal line projects launched in 2009, aimed at the economic segment and within the guidelines of the federal government incentive plan Minha Casa, Minha Vida. A joint venture with Construtora Capital was established that same year to operate in northern states of the country.

=== 2010 - present ===
In 2010, the PAULISTANA regional office opened, focusing on medium and high standard properties in São Paulo. A joint venture with Toctao Engenharia was also established to operate in Goiânia.

Rossi partnered with Construtora Norcon in 2011 to operate in the markets of Alagoas, Bahia, Pernambuco, and Sergipe under the Norcon Rossi brand.

In 2012, Rossi presented the process of developing two new business areas: Rossi Commercial Properties, (shopping centers linked to shopping malls) and Rossi Urbanizadora (highlighting the areas under development). Through these subsidiaries, it will be possible to monetize and develop projects that are already available in Rossi's land stock more efficiently.

Rossi was recognized with the 20th ABEMD Award in 2014. Rossi won the Real Estate Marketing award at the 2nd edition of Conecta Imobi in 2015. The EntreVerdes Campinas project received the Master Real Estate Award 2015, in the Environment Preservation category.
