= Zolostays =

Zolostays is a real-tech co-living focused startup that provides ready-to-move rooms/beds.

It was founded in 2015 by Nikhil Sikri, Akhil Sikri and Sneha Choudhry.

== Overview ==
During the pandemic, Zolo provided 75 of rent-free accommodation to those who lost their jobs.

Zolo uses bulk inventory in usually residential township and ties up with real estate companies to make the rooms/beds available. Zolostays has both revenue sharing and leased model.

== History ==
Zolostays was founded in 2015 to solve the problem of students and young professionals who would move to temporarily go to other cities to study and work and look for affordable housing.

In 2020, it was operating in 10 Indian cities. It has four round of funding, with total $98 million.

== See also ==
- Stanza Living
