= Elie Horn =

Brazilian businessman (born 1944)

- Born: Elie Horn; 1944 (age 81–82); Aleppo, Syria
- Occupation: Businessman
- Known for: Founder and principal of Cyrela Brazil Realty
- Spouse: Susy Horn
- Children: 3

Elie (Eli) Horn (born in 1944) is a Brazilian billionaire businessman and philanthropist operating in Brazil, and president of Cyrela Brazil Realty.

== Biography ==
Elie Horn was born to a Jewish family in Aleppo (then under the French Mandate for Syria). His family emigrated to Brazil when he was 11. As a teenager, he began working with his brother, Joe Horn, in developing the city of São Paulo, gaining experience in real estate. Horn received a degree in law from Mackenzie University. In 1962, he founded his own company, Cyrela, and built it into the largest publicly traded developer of high-end residential buildings in Brazil.

== Cyrela Brazil Realty ==
Horn is a controlling shareholder in Cyrela Brazil Realty and is a developer and builder of real estate located in the state of São Paulo, Brazil. It operates in 17 states and 66 cities in Brazil, Argentina and Uruguay. The company has existed for 50 years and has over 8,000 clients, 15,000 employees and has developed over 70,000 housing units between 2015 and 2018. Cyrela is traded on the Brazilian stock market at a $2 billion market cap.

Horn is chairman of Cyrela's board of directors and chief executive officer. Serving in both capacities since the incorporation of Brazil Realty in 1994. Horn is founding partner and president of Cyrela since 1978. In 2014, Horn retired as CEO of Cyrela with his two sons, Raphael and Efraim becoming co-CEOs.

== Business philosophy and achievements ==
Horn is described by Forbes as a:

"Real estate magnate (who) founded Cyrela Brazil Realty in 1978; built it into largest developer of high-end residential buildings in São Paulo and Rio de Janeiro. Later expanded by inking development deals with partners in various regions of Brazil. Horn also owns slice of agricultural investor BrasilAgro. A low-profile man known for giving 20% of his earnings to charity reportedly told Brazilian press he plans to give away most of his fortune at his death. In 2008 he told Wharton: 'My history is to make money when there is a boom, not when there is a crisis.'"

== Philanthropy ==
- Horn has donated large sums to help causes in Israel, including a $6m donation to the state.
- He has contributed to programs that benefit the Haredi community, such as:

"...In 2007, the Kemach Foundation ("Promoting Haredi Employment" ) was founded. Its purpose is to help Haredi students sustain themselves in dignity. Behind Kemach stands philanthropist Leo Noe, owner of British company Reit Asset Management; Zev Wolfson, Joel Landau, executive director of Israel Up Close Productions, who is involved with Yad Ezra V’Shulamit. They were also joined by Brazilian billionaire Elie Horn."

In 2015, Horn and his wife Susy signed Warren Buffett's The Giving Pledge, pledging to donate 60% their wealth over their lifetime to charitable causes. Elie was the first Brazilian to do so.

== Net worth ==
Since 2006, Horn has been on the list of Forbes billionaires. During 2015 the Brazilian GDP fell by 3.2% and Horn's Cyrela Brazil lost 55% of its value, shrinking Horn's wealth down to about $500 million, temporarily removing him from the list of the world's billionaires. Per Forbes magazine, as of March 2018, Horn had a net worth of US$1.0B.

== Personal life ==
Horn is married to Susy and has three children.
