= Joel Landau (rabbi) =

Modern Orthodox rabbi from New York City associated with Yad Ezra V'Shulamit in Israel

Personal life
- Born: New York City
- Education: Empire State College (BA in Liberal Arts and Sciences) Judaic Studies Post Graduate Degree issued by the Chief Rabbinate of Israel
- Occupation: Rabbi; Executive Director of “Israel Up Close Productions”

Religious life
- Religion: Judaism

Jewish leader
- Residence: Israel

Joel Landau (born in Queens, New York) is a Modern Orthodox rabbi. He is associated with Yad Ezra V’Shulamit, an organization providing help to people in need throughout Israel, and The Kemach Foundation whose mission is to make positive impact in Israeli society, by contributing to its economic development, and providing resources and support for the members of the ultra-Orthodox community. Currently he serves as the executive director of “Israel Up Close Productions”, a non-profit film production company that researches and reports on how Israeli innovations improve the everyday life of people across the world.

== Life and career ==
=== Early life and education ===
Joel Landau was born in Queens, New York, to a religious Zionist family. He spent his childhood in New York and Israel. In 1974 he and his family moved to Kefar Hanoar Hodayot, a village in Israel, and a few years later they moved to the Jewish quarter of the Old City of Jerusalem. This allowed him to get involved in the reclamation of Jewish-owned property in the Moslem Quarter. Upon finishing high school he joined the "Shvut Yisrael" Hesder Yeshiva in Efrat.

Landau has a Bachelor of Arts degree in Liberal Arts and Sciences from Empire State College, a teaching credential from Lipshitz College, ordination from the Chief Rabbinate in Jerusalem, and a post- graduate degree in Judaic Studies issued by the Chief Rabbinate of Israel.

=== Career ===
In 1988 Landau became the Associate Rabbi of Brith Sholom Beth Israel Synagogue in Charleston, South Carolina. He was a founding member of the Charleston County Law Enforcement Chaplaincy, which provided personal and spiritual counseling. Four years later he became the Rav of Beth Jacob Congregation of Irvine, California. During his 12 years of service he managed to triple the size of the shul, and in addition to his rabbi responsibilities he was actively involved in many aspects of the Jewish community life, from local schools to the JCC, Federation, AIPAC and representing Israel and Judaism in general. He also helped raise thousands of dollars for Israeli victims of terror. In 2004, Landau returned to Israel and became involved with Yad Ezra V’Shulamit, and through this organization he helped provide thousands of food baskets every week and distribute them to those in need across Israel. Inspired by this, he decided to make an even bigger impact and became involved with The Kemach Foundation, an organization whose mission is to bring positive changes into Israeli society, enable members of the ultra-Orthodox community to join the work-force and contribute to the economic development of Israel by providing them with support and resources.

Starting from June 2011, Landau has served as the executive director of "Israel Up Close Productions" or IUC, a non-profit company that focuses on Israel's positive impact and quality of life through its advances in medicine, healthcare, education, technology, agriculture, ecology and so on. The non-profit film production company identifies, researches, and reports on how Israeli innovations improve the daily lives of people throughout the world. Their humanitarian initiatives and outreach projects around the globe, demonstrate Israel's concern for people in need.

=== Personal life ===
Landau is married to Johni née Rakov, and the couple has three sons, three daughters and seven grandchildren.
