= CCDI =

CCDI may refer to:

- Camargo Corrêa Desenvolvimento Imobiliário, Brazilian real estate company
- Canadian Centre for Diversity and Inclusion, Canadian nonprofit organization
- Central Commission for Discipline Inspection of the Chinese Communist Party
- China Construction Design International
