= Zev Wolfson =

American businessman and philanthropist (1928–2012)

- Born: September 27, 1928
- Died: August 13, 2012 (aged 83)
- Burial place: Wellwood Cemetery in West Babylon, NY
- Occupations: Real Estate Developer & Philanthropist
- Spouse: Nadine (Nechama) Wolfson
- Children: 10
- Parent(s): Abraham & Rachel Wolfowski
- Family: Dovi Safier (grandson)

Zev Wolfson (September 27, 1928 – August 13, 2012) was a Jewish businessman and philanthropist, who has been remembered as one of the most important figures in American Orthodoxy over the past century.

== Background ==
Born to a Jewish family in Vilna (then Poland) as Wolf Wolfowski, he became a war refugee at the age of 13 when his family was exiled by Russian forces in the days before the German occupation of Lithuania in June 1941. He spent the remainder of the war years in Siberia and Dzhambul. At 16, he carried his father's dead body over his shoulder to bury him in the frozen tundra, and took responsibility for the support of his mother and younger brother. He began trading on the black market in order to obtain food and goods for survival. Following the end of the war, they left Russia, reaching Lodz, Poland and eventually a DP Camp in Germany where they obtained visas to America.

In May 1947 they immigrated to New York City, where Zev worked for his uncle Mendel Aviv in the electronics business. Eventually, he went off on his own and saw instant success selling refurbished television tubes to customers in South America. As a young man seeking to make a difference in his new country, Wolfson attached himself to the Torah sage Rabbi Aharon Kotler, working at his side to help build and sustain important Jewish causes such as Chinuch Atzmai and Torah Umesorah.

== Business career ==
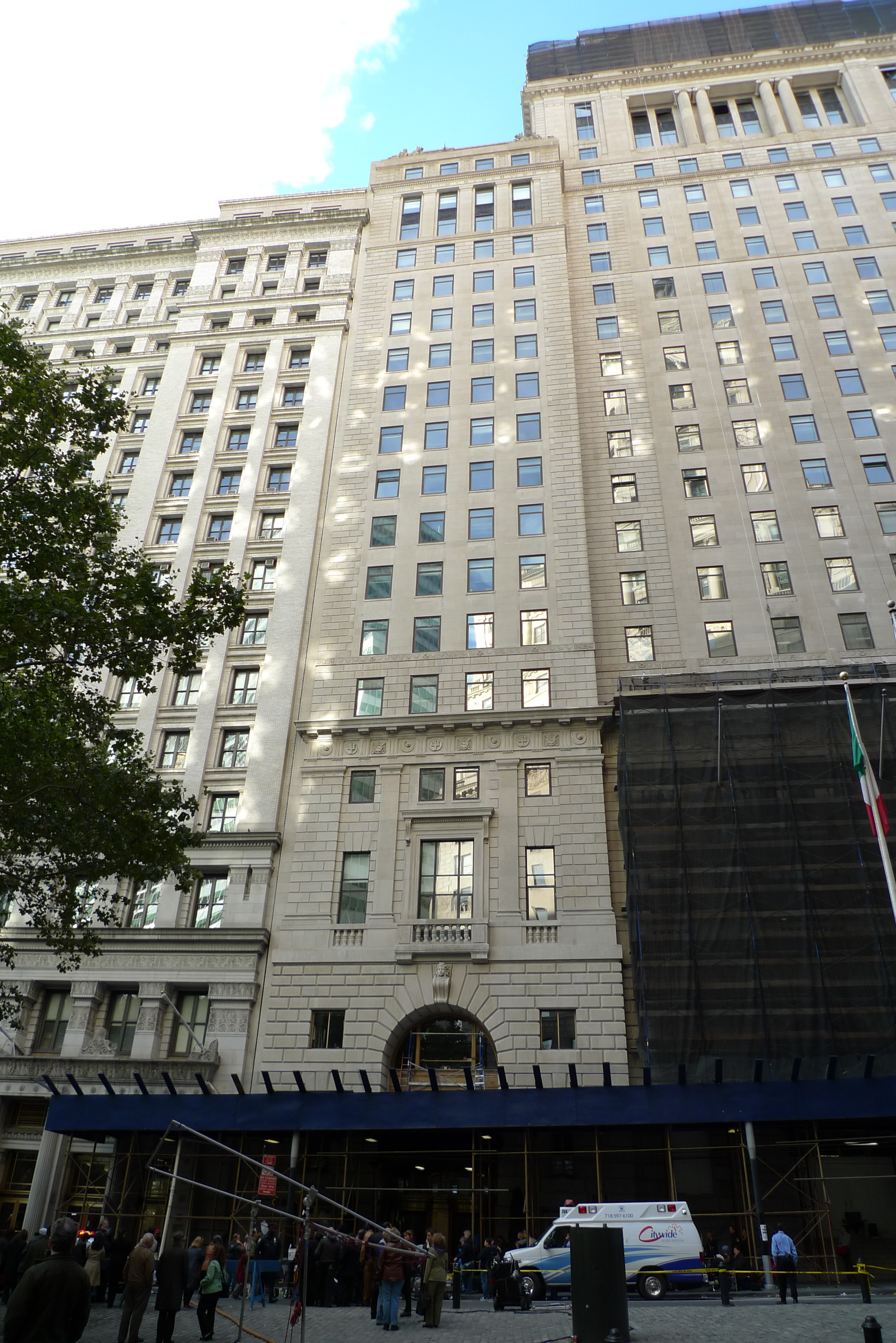
The Cunard Building at 25 Broadway in Lower Manhattan

Wolfson started developing real estate in the 1960s, eventually building skyscrapers in Manhattan's financial district. His first major project was One State Street Plaza, a 33 story, Class A skyscraper located at the southern tip of Manhattan. It was completed in 1969 and renovated in 1995. In 1979, he acquired the iconic Cunard Building, one of Lower Manhattan's architectural gems. In the 1970's he started to leverage his assets to invest in hedge funds and private equity. During the following years his wealth grew rapidly, eventually cycling hundreds of millions of dollars. Some of those he invested with in his early days include legendary financiers Carl Icahn, Julian Robertson and Michael Steinhardt as well as funds such as KKR, Apollo Global Management and The Blackstone Group.

A strategic investor during its nascent stages, Wolfson is considered to be a pioneer of the hedge fund industry. Wolfson is said to be one of the first Americans to utilize such strategies to grow his wealth in such fashion, and under the leadership of his children, his family office is said to continue to employ similar investment strategies today.

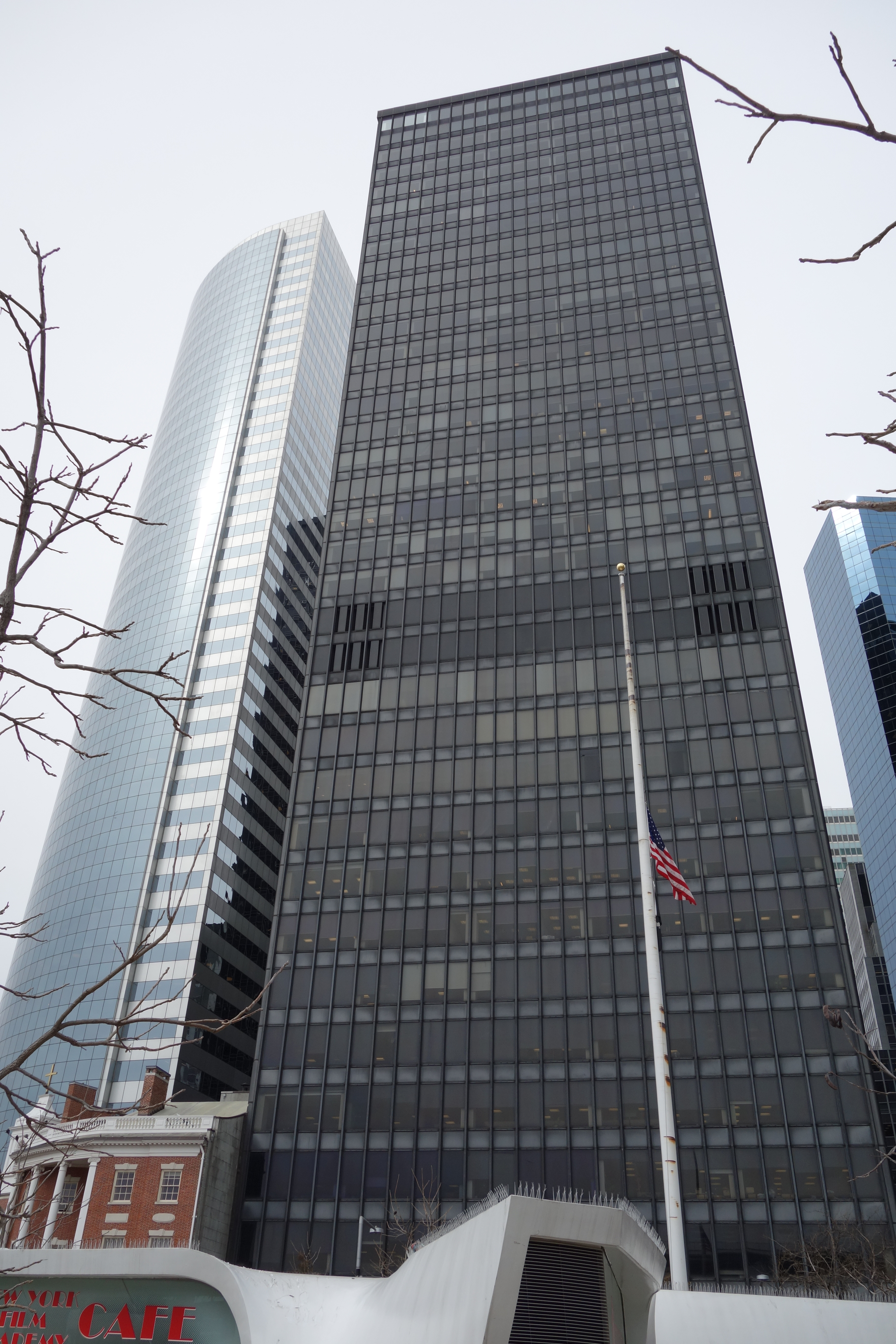
One State Street. Wolfson's first major real estate project.

Upon being introduced to Mr. Wolfson for the first time, the chairman of Merrill Lynch asked him how he had acquired his wealth. "God gave it to me," Zev replied, without hesitation. He felt no need to expand. He not only believed that God had given him his wealth, but that the money belonged to God, and was only entrusted to him as long as he used it for God's purposes. In the midst of the most intense business negotiations, he almost never failed to take a call regarding one of his projects or from a family member. Into his 70s, he still flew economy class. He would not permit the money with which he had been blessed to become a source of honor. Where other large donors condition their gifts on having buildings named after them, Zev always insisted on the opposite condition – that his name not be linked to whatever cause he was supporting.

== Relationship with Israel and politics ==
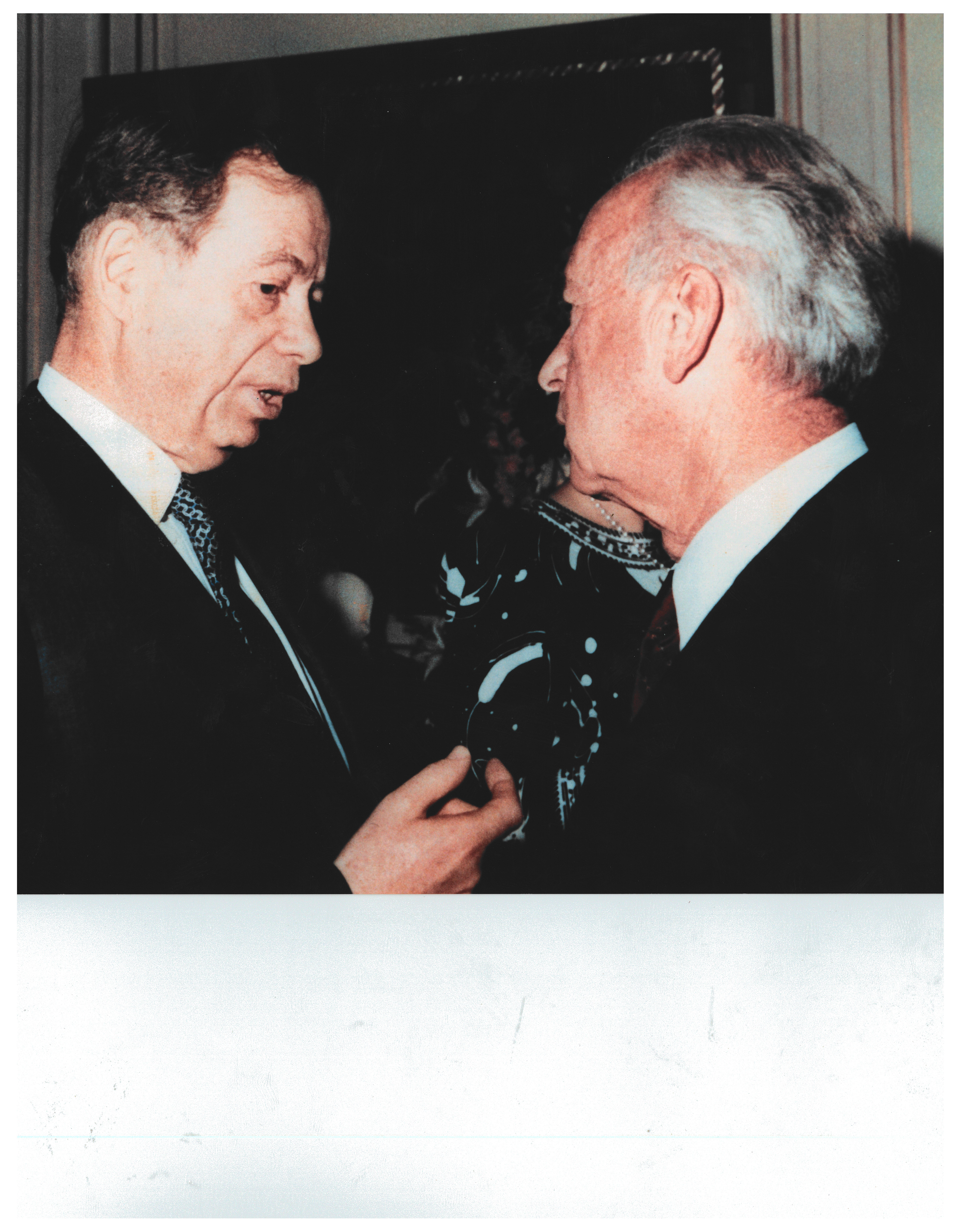
Zev Wolfson and Israeli PM Yitzchok Rabin

In 1985, at a time of hyperinflation in Israel, Wolfson saved Israel hundreds of millions in interest payments by shepherding through Congress an appropriations bill that permitted Israel to refinance existing loans at much lower interest rates by prepaying the existing loans with the benefit of US loan guarantees. In 1989, when Israel was in desperate need of money to absorb hundreds of thousands of refugees from the former Soviet Union (FSU), Wolfson played a major role in securing $10 billion in US government loan guarantees. Nor were his efforts on behalf of Israel limited to the economic sphere. In 1968, Israel's ambassador to the United States, Yitzchak Rabin, was eager to have language written into the foreign aid bill favoring the sale of Phantom jets to Israel. He turned to Zev to use his connections on Capitol Hill, and it was done. The two men became close friends.

A senior Israeli finance ministry official once noted that, "when the economic history of the State of Israel is written, Wolfson will be one of the three crucial figures in its first half century, after only David Ben-Gurion and Pinchas Sapir", (the long-time finance minister with whom Wolfson worked closely). Working with leading figures in Congress, most prominently Senator Daniel Inouye of Hawaii and Senator Joseph Biden of Delaware, he succeeded in having inserted into foreign aid appropriation bills, on several occasions, provisions altering the repayment terms on US governmental loans to Israel, or having the loans changed to grants. The resulting savings to Israel totaled billions of dollars. The vast majority of these lobbying efforts were at Wolfson's individual initiative, based on his keen understanding of where the levers of power in Congress lay – an understanding fostered, in part, by frequent reading of the Congressional Record.

Former senate majority leader Trent Lott attributed much of his influence in Congress to the fact that he never sought anything for himself. And although Wolfson's DC lobbying efforts took place under the radar, their impact was well known to senior officials in Jerusalem. For approximately two decades, a special section of the annual defense allocations in the Israeli budget was known as Se'if Wolfson. The monies in that section were directed to projects determined by Wolfson. He persuaded French president Jacques Chirac, for instance, to supply land for Otzar HaTorah schools, which primarily served immigrants from North Africa, and then paid for the building with monies from the Israeli government. Similarly, he obtained millions of dollars via the Israeli government for Jewish education in the FSU.

In the 1960s and '70s, Wolfson obtained US government funding to build dozens of institutions in Israel, under a provision for schools and hospitals abroad from the USAID budget. Most of those institutions served children of Jewish refugees from Arab lands, a group extremely close to his heart. Once the schools and residential educational centers were built, he was often able to secure further funding from the Israeli government. All these efforts to obtain government funding were the product of his early insight that governments can provide funding at a level far beyond that possible through private philanthropy.

In lauding Wolfson's accomplishments in the political sphere, former Conference of Presidents of Major American Jewish Organizations CEO Malcolm Hoenlein, "He was the pioneer, the one responsible for initiating much of the political outreach that we [the American Jewish community] take for granted today".

Besides lifelong friends like Senator's Inouye, Lott, Dole and Biden, Wolfson worked closely with many important US Senators and Congressman including Otto Passman, the Louisiana congressman from 1947–1977 who chaired the House Appropriations Subcommittee on Foreign Aid, Massachusetts Senator Ted Kennedy, Indiana Senator Homer E Capehart, Wisconsin Senator Robert Kasten and House Majority Leader Eric Cantor.

== Philanthropy ==
By the late 1980's however, Wolfson found his ability to fund his projects via either the Israeli or American governments greatly circumscribed. At that point, Wolfson began giving from his personal fortune on a scale perhaps unprecedented in Jewish history. Wolfson had clearly defined goals. His focus was Jewish education and outreach. His activities spanned the globe and he was constantly on the lookout for talented individuals who could make a difference. He was attracted to those who thought big, and often complained that there were not enough high-impact projects for the money he wanted to give. Rabbi Moshe Shapiro, Rabbi Asher Weiss, Rabbi Yitzchok Dovid Grossman, Rabbi Shlomo Riskin, Rabbi Yaakov Hillel, Rabbi Shlomo Raanan and Rabbi David Refson were all greatly boosted by his support and ideas.

One beneficiary of his work wrote regarding Wolfson's audacious ability to think big: "He was uninterested in funding something for a few thousand dollars. He wanted something earth-shattering for a few million." He added that he once approached Wolfson for help with opening a niche Jewish Day School and was immediately yelled at, "Why one? Why not ten or twenty? You do ten or twenty and I will pay for them!"

Beyond Rabbi Aharon Kotler and his son Rabbi Shneur Kotler, Wolfson maintained a close relationship with other important rabbis such as Rabbi Moshe Feinstein, Rabbi Aharon Leib Steinman, Rabbi Joseph B Soloveitchik, Rabbi Herman Neuberger, Rabbi Dovid Cohen, Rabbi Avraham Pam and Rabbi Ovadia Yosef. Wolfson regularly initiated partnerships with other legendary Jewish philanthropists in order to maximise his reach. The Canadian Reichmann family and Brazilian businessman Elie Horn worked with Wolfson to fund Jewish outreach and education around the world.

Wolfson was famous for not accepting recognition for his largess and did not allow his name to be displayed on buildings or even smaller plaques. The notable exception to that is the Hebron Yeshiva in Jerusalem, where the building carries his name. Some have speculated that his lifelong personal relationship with the Hebroni family is the reason he allowed for an exception. In paying tribute to Wolfson, US Senator Joseph Lieberman, compared his humble nature to that of Moses, "who just wanted to be judged by his actions". In 1980, in the presence of Israeli Prime Minister Menachem Begin, Wolfson was conferred with an honorary doctorate by the Jerusalem College of Technology, a school he helped found with Professor Ze'ev Lev in the late 60's. It is not known whether he attended the event.

== Personal life ==
After WWII, Wolfson's mother Rachel remarried famed yiddish writer and poet Aaron Zeitlin.

His wife Nadine is herself a prolific philanthropist and the founder of Shalom Task Force, along with several other Jewish organizations focused on domestic violence prevention and community support.

Wolfson had 10 children, who still continue his business and charitable work from a NYC skyscraper that he built.

His eldest son, Rabbi Avrohom (Abraham) Wolfson was a noted philanthropist and Torah scholar who died in December 2020 at the age of 64, a few months after suffering a heart attack from which he never recovered. Avrohom was remembered as a man of exceptional character whose wealth meant little to him as he eschewed materialism. At his funeral, Rabbi Elya Ber Wachtfogel called him a "one in a generation figure" and someone who possessed a "holy tongue." Other speakers spoke of how he was always careful not to speak Lashon Horah and took great care of many orphans and widows with a personal touch. He is buried at the Har Hamenuchot cemetery in Jerusalem.

His son Aaron is the president of The Wolfson Group and is active in many of the family's charitable endeavors, including Olami, which was founded by his father and Elie Horn in 2001 to perpetuate Jewish identity and continuity on college campuses around the world.

His son Morris Wolfson is the founder of Ness Technologies, and invests in public and private companies.

His youngest son, Daniel Wolfson is an active investor in technology companies.

His stepson, Rabbi David Fohrman, is a noted author, lecturer and the CEO & the Founder of Aleph Beta.

His grandson, Dovi Safier, is a writer on Jewish history and advisor to Pennsylvania senator John Fetterman.
