= Construtora Tenda =

Construtora Tenda S.A. or Tenda, until 1994 Tenda Engenharia S.A, is a Brazilian construction company founded in 1969 in Minas Gerais with its headquarters being located in São Paulo. The company was listed on the São Paulo Stock Exchange where it raised 603 million reais ($345 million) in an initial public offering in 2007. In 2008, the company was acquired by Gafisa, who later was spun off in 2017.

== Links Oficiais da Construtora Tenda ==
- Site Oficial
- Blog da Tenda
- Loja Virtual Tenda
- Simulador de Financiamento
- Casa Verde e Amarela
- Minha Casa Minha Vida
- Apartamentos Minha Casa Minha Vida
