= Norcon Sociedade Nordestina de Construções S/A =

Norcon Sociedade Nordestina de Construções S.A.
- Type: Sociedade Anônima
- Industry: Construction & Real Estate
- Founded: 1958
- Headquarters: Aracaju:Sergipe, Brazil
- Key people: Marcos Amin Telles, (Chairman & CEO)
- Products: House-building
- Website: www.norcon.com.br

NORCON Northeastern Society of Constructions S/A is a Brazilian homebuilder and real estate company. The company was founded in 1958, and is headquartered in Aracaju Sergipe. The company is owned by Brazilian Eng.Luiz Antonio Mesquita Teixeira & Economist Tarcisio Mesquita Teixeira.
