= Cyrela Brazil Realty =

Brazilian homebuilder and real estate company

Cyrela Brazil Realty S.A Empreendimentos e Participações
- Type: Sociedade Anônima
- Traded as: B3: CYRE3; Ibovespa Component
- Industry: Real estate and Construction
- Founded: 1962
- Headquarters: São Paulo, Brazil
- Key people: Efraim Horn & Raphael Horn, (CEOs); Elie Horn, (Chairman)
- Products: House-building
- Revenue: ▼US$ 784.5 million (2017)
- Net income: ▼ - US$ 28.6 million (2017)
- Number of employees: 8,000
- Website: www.cyrela.com.br

Cyrela Brazil Realty is the largest homebuilder and real estate company by revenue and market value in Brazil. Considered one of the most solid of the civil construction sector, currently operates in 16 states and 66 cities in Brazil, in addition to Argentina and Uruguay. Founded in 1962, with 35,000 customers Cyrella built 7,250,000 square feet (674,000 m^{2}) of properties. The company is headquartered in São Paulo and listed in the B3.

The company was included in the Interbrand Ranking of the 25 Most Valuable Brazilian Brands in 2010, with an estimated brand value of R$545 million, occupying the 14th position. In the first quarter of 2013, the company had a net profit of R$179 million.

Cyrela Brazil Realty's Latin American competitors include such as Brazilian companies PDG Realty, Gafisa, MRV and Even and the Mexican Homex.

Among its main projects, the Faria Lima Financial Center and JK Financial Center in São Paulo and Le Parc Residential Resort in Salvador.

== History ==
The company was founded by the Syrian born Jewish billionaire businessman Elie Horn is CEO and majority shareholder of CBR.
