= Cobourg CDCI West =

Coordinates: 43.95903°N 78.17141°W

Cobourg District Collegiate Institute West (CDCI) was a high school in Cobourg, Ontario, Canada, founded in 1901.

The school is located on King Street West. Cobourg West closed in June 2015 and merged with Cobourg East High School. In September 2014, Cobourg East was renamed Cobourg Collegiate Institute. The former CDCI West building was purchased and has become William Academy, a co-educational private school for grades 7 to 12.
