= Cathay Drug =

Healthcare Company

The Cathay Drug Co., Inc.
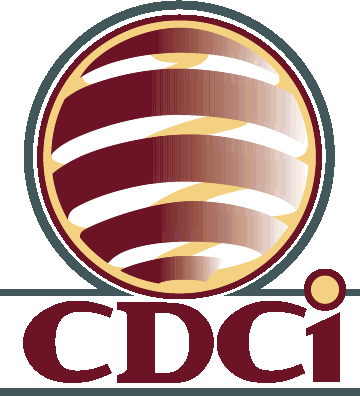
- Company type: Corporation
- Industry: Pharmaceutical
- Founded: 1952
- Founder: Yao Shiong Shio and family
- Headquarters: Vernida I Condominium 120 Amorsolo Street, Legazpi Village, Makati, Philippines
- Key people: Yao Shiong Shio
- Website: cathaydrug.com

The Cathay Drug Company, Inc. (CDCI) is a Philippine pharmaceutical company based in Makati.

== History ==
Cathay Drug was founded in 1952 by the family of Yao Shiong Shio, a widely known postwar industrialist and president of the Filipino-Chinese Chambers of Commerce and Industry in 1974 to 1976. From 1952 to 2000, Cathay Drug Company has been the exclusive distributor of pharmaceutical and animal health products from American company Merck Co., which is known outside the United States and Canada as Merck Sharp and Dohme.

== Operations ==
The Cathay Drug Company operates exclusively in the Philippines. Its main area of specialization is the marketing and distribution of pharmaceutical drugs and products for both humans and animals. The company acquires its products through licensing agreements with domestic and international firms. Among its main suppliers are the following:

- Zambon SpA (Italy)
- Biopharm Chemicals Co. Ltd. (Thailand)
- Aldo Union SpA (Italy)
- Dexa Medica
- Lupin Ltd. (India)
- Aurobindo Pharma Ltd. (India)
- Ajanta Pharma Ltd. (India)

== Reception ==
Cathay Drug is recognized as one of the fastest-growing pharmaceutical companies in the Philippines. In 2012, it was included in the Top 20 Leading Philippine Pharmaceutical Companies based on Value in the Philippine Pharmaceutical Industry Audit for ethical segment by IMS. It was also ranked second among national pharmaceutical companies for ethical segment.
