= Xinyuan Real Estate =

Chinese real estate company

- Company type: Public
- Traded as: NYSE: XIN
- Industry: Real estate development Property management
- Founder: Zhang Yong; Yang Yuyan
- Headquarters: Beijing, China
- Area served: Beijing, Hefei, Jinan, Kunshan, Suzhou, Zhengzhou, Xuzhou and Chengdu
- Key people: Zhang Yong (Chairman); Zhang Lizhou (CEO)
- Revenue: ▲$449 million - 2009
- Net income: ▲$42.4 million - 2009
- Total assets: $881.7 million - 2009
- Total equity: $446.9 million - 2009
- Subsidiaries: See below.
- Website: www.xyre.com

Xinyuan Real Estate Co., Ltd. (Chinese: 鑫苑置业; pinyin: Xīnyuàn Zhìyè) is a Chinese real estate company.

Xinyuan has traditionally engaged principally in residential real estate development and the provision of property management services, focusing on Tier II cities in China.

== History ==
Xinyuan is a real estate developer building large-scale residential projects for middle-income consumers in China's Tier II cities. The company was founded in 1997 in Zhengzhou, China and puts up developments aimed at providing middle-income consumers with a community lifestyle. Xinyuan's business model emphasizes high asset turnover, efficient working capital management and strict cost control.

Xinyuan's projects in China extend to Tier II cities: Chengdu, Hefei, Jinan, Kunshan, Suzhou, and Zhengzhou. They have a total of 26 projects and more than 3 million square meters of GFA developed, under construction and under planning.

On December 7, 2005, Forte (Group) Co. Ltd announced that its subsidiary Shanghai Xinyuan Real Estate Development Co. Ltd had successfully acquired 30% stake of Shanghai Baisi Property Co.

Xinyuan's holding company is based in the Cayman Islands. On 18 April 2008, Xinyuan's corporate headquarters was relocated from Zhengzhou to Beijing. On 12 December 2007, Xinyuan made an initial public offering, becoming the first Chinese real estate developer to become listed on the New York Stock Exchange. Underwritten by Merrill Lynch, Deutsche Bank Securities, and Allen & Co, Xinyuan's initial public offering raised US$245m in capital. China Analyst reports that Xinyuan's stock is the 2nd fastest growing within its respective industry as of March 2010.

Xinyuan was selected as one of "China's Sixty Best Employers for 2007" in a survey conducted by China Central Television. The China Real Estate Top 10 Committee has selected Xinyuan as one of "China's Top 10 Overseas-Listed Real Estate Developers", and has awarded it the "Top 100 Chinese Real Estate Companies with Greatest Growth Potential Award" once, and the "Top 100 Chinese Real Estate Companies Award" thrice consecutively.

In 2009, Xinyuan purchased a portion of the real estate portfolio of prolific Brooklyn real estate developer Isaac Hager who declared bankruptcy. In 2012, the company entered the United States real estate market as XIN Development Group International, Inc. With a development in Brooklyn, New York, it became the first Chinese developer with a major project in the United States.

In 2017, Lizhou Zhang succeeded Xinqi Wang as CEO.

On January 7, 2024, the company's US division declared Chapter 11 bankruptcy protection. On April 15, 2025, creditors pushed Xinyuan Real Estate into bankruptcy for the second time in a year in order to collect on bonds due back in 2024.

== Services and subsidiaries ==
Xinyuan provides landscaping and intercom systems installation services through two of its 11 subsidiaries, Zhengzhou Mingyuan Landscape Engineering Co., Ltd. and Zhengzhou Xinyuan Computer Network Engineering Co., Ltd.

=== Joint ventures ===
Xinyuan has joint ventures with Blue Ridge Capital, China Construction Bank, and Equity International.

== Projects ==
As of 2007, Xinyuan had 13 completed projects and 14 in development or planning.

Name	Location	Total site area	Gross floor area	Status
Kunshan International City Garden	Kunshan, Jiangsu	200,008 m^{2} (2,152,870 sq ft)	497,041 m^{2} (5,350,100 sq ft)	Under construction (2012)
Zhengzhou Central Garden (East and West)	Zhengdong District, Zhengzhou, Henan	140,313 m^{2} (1,510,320 sq ft)	355,590 m^{2} (3,827,500 sq ft)	Completed
Jinan City Family	Huaiyin District, Jinan, Shandong	47,411 m^{2} (510,330 sq ft)	61,065 m^{2} (657,300 sq ft)	Completed
Xuzhou Xinyuan Colorful Garden	Quanshan District, Xuzhou, Jiangsu	46,777 m^{2} (503,500 sq ft)	102,097 m^{2} (1,098,960 sq ft)	Under construction (2012)
Zhengzhou City Family	Guancheng District, Zhengzhou, Henan	21,380 m^{2} (230,100 sq ft)	39,226 m^{2} (422,230 sq ft)	Completed
Zhengzhou City Manor	Erqi District, Zhengzhou, Henan	63,089 m^{2} (679,080 sq ft)	118,716 m^{2} (1,277,850 sq ft)	Completed
Zhengzhou Xinyuan Splendid	Jinshui District, Zhengzhou, Henan	192,885 m^{2} (2,076,200 sq ft)	386,332 m^{2} (4,158,440 sq ft)	Completed
Longhai Star Garden	Zhongyuan District, Zhengzhou, Henan	11,719 m^{2} (126,140 sq ft)	39,975 m^{2} (430,290 sq ft)	Completed
Chengdu Xinyuan Splendid I	Jinjiang District, Chengdu, Sichuan	34,007 m^{2} (366,050 sq ft)	231,002 m^{2} (2,486,480 sq ft)	Completed
Chengdu Xinyuan Splendid II	Jinjiang District, Chengdu, Sichuan	30,497 m^{2} (328,270 sq ft)	216,900 m^{2} (2,335,000 sq ft)	Completed
Hefei Wangjiang Garden	Baohe District, Hefei, Anhui	51,939 m^{2} (559,070 sq ft)	145,452 m^{2} (1,565,630 sq ft)	Completed
Suzhou International City Garden	New District, Suzhou, Jiangsu	119,089 m^{2} (1,281,860 sq ft)	205,591 m^{2} (2,212,960 sq ft)	Completed
Suzhou Colorful Garden	Gusu District (formerly Jinchang District), Suzhou, Jiangsu	81,506 m^{2} (877,320 sq ft)	190,000 m^{2} (2,000,000 sq ft)	Completed
Suzhou Lake Splendid	Wuzhong District, Suzhou, Jiangsu	130,945 m^{2} (1,409,480 sq ft)	198,113 m^{2} (2,132,470 sq ft)	Completed
Jinan Xinyuan Splendid	Jinan, Shandong	200,180 m^{2} (2,154,700 sq ft)	526,990 m^{2} (5,672,500 sq ft)	Under construction (2012)
Jinan International City Garden	Jinan, Shandong	93,928 m^{2} (1,011,030 sq ft)	292,200 m^{2} (3,145,000 sq ft)	Completed
Jinan Elegant Scenery	Tianqiao District, Jinan, Shandong	61,500 m^{2} (662,000 sq ft)	110,000 m^{2} (1,200,000 sq ft)	Completed
Zhengzhou Commercial Plaza	Jinshui District, Zhengzhou, Henan	8,410 m^{2} (90,500 sq ft)	67,578 m^{2} (727,400 sq ft)	Completed
Zhengzhou Xinyuan Colorful Garden	Erqi District, Zhengzhou, Henan	74,462 m^{2} (801,500 sq ft)	191,891 m^{2} (2,065,500 sq ft)	Completed
Zhengzhou Yipin Xiangshan Phase I	Huiji District, Zhengzhou, Henan	57,289 m^{2} (616,650 sq ft)	94,528 m^{2} (1,017,490 sq ft)	Completed
Zhengzhou Yipin Xiangshan Phase II	Huiji District, Zhengzhou, Henan	81,345 m^{2} (875,590 sq ft)	198,543 m^{2} (2,137,100 sq ft)	Under construction (2012)
Zhengzhou Century East A	New East District, Zhengzhou, Henan	22,418 m^{2} (241,310 sq ft)	77,341 m^{2} (832,490 sq ft)	Under construction (2012)
Zhengzhou Century East B	New East District, Zhengzhou, Henan	51,372 m^{2} (552,960 sq ft)	166,468 m^{2} (1,791,850 sq ft)	Under construction (2012)
Zhengzhou Century Royal Place	Zhengzhou, Henan	45,716 m^{2} (492,080 sq ft)	132,238 m^{2} (1,423,400 sq ft)	Under construction (2012)
Zhengzhou Modern City	Erqi District, Zhengzhou, Henan	60,556 m^{2} (651,820 sq ft)	256,905 m^{2} (2,765,300 sq ft)	Under construction (2012)
Source: Xinyuan Real Estate development and completed project lists, April 2012 SEC filing (Form 20-F), Reuters profile.

== See also ==
- Real estate in China
- Beijing Financial Street
