= Homex =

Mexican homebuilding company

Desarrolladora Homex, S.A.B. de C.V.
- Type: Public
- Traded as: BMV: HOMEX *
- Industry: Construction, real estate
- Founded: 1989; 37 years ago
- Headquarters: Culiacán, Sinaloa, Mexico
- Products: Residential housing
- Website: homex.com.mx

Desarrolladora Homex, S.A.B. de C.V., commonly known as Homex, is a Mexican homebuilding company that develops, constructs and sells affordable, middle-income and residential housing in Mexico. Founded in 1989 in Culiacán, Sinaloa, it is headquartered there and its shares are listed on the Mexican Stock Exchange.

By the late 2000s, Homex had grown into one of the largest homebuilders in Mexico, with operations in dozens of cities across the country and a dual listing on the New York Stock Exchange under the ticker HXM. The company filed for the Mexican equivalent of bankruptcy protection (concurso mercantil) in April 2014, was delisted from the New York Stock Exchange prior to that filing, and emerged from bankruptcy in October 2015 under new equity ownership.

In March 2017, Homex agreed to settle U.S. Securities and Exchange Commission (SEC) charges that it had reported fake sales of more than 100,000 homes between 2010 and 2013, inflating reported revenue by approximately $3.3 billion. Investigators used satellite imagery showing undeveloped land at sites where Homex had recorded completed home sales. Default judgments were later entered in 2021 against four former senior officers of the company.

== History ==
=== Founding and early growth ===
Homex was founded in 1989 in Culiacán, Sinaloa, with an initial focus on commercial construction. During the early 1990s the company expanded into other states and shifted toward affordable housing development.

In 2002, the company received an investment of approximately $32 million from Sam Zell through his Equity International fund. Through the mid-2000s, production grew rapidly, expanding from roughly 5,000 homes per year to more than 50,000 homes per year. Homex completed an initial public offering in 2004 and listed its shares on the New York Stock Exchange and the Mexican Stock Exchange, raising approximately $141 million. In 2005, the company acquired Mexican rival Casas Beta, and Equity International divested its remaining stake in 2008.

=== 2014 financial collapse ===
Trading in Homex's common shares on the Mexican Stock Exchange was suspended in February 2014 following unusual share-price movements and the company's failure to file a required quarterly financial statement on time. The company was delisted from the New York Stock Exchange shortly afterward. In April 2014, Homex filed for concurso mercantil, the Mexican equivalent of bankruptcy protection, listing liabilities of approximately 98 billion Mexican pesos, then reported as the largest debt of any company to enter that legal process. Homex emerged from bankruptcy in October 2015 under new equity ownership.

=== SEC accounting-fraud case ===
In March 2017, the SEC announced that Homex had agreed to settle charges of accounting fraud, alleging that the company had inflated reported home sales by approximately 317 percent and overstated revenue by roughly $3.3 billion during the period from 2010 to 2013. According to the SEC, Homex reported revenue from a project site in Guanajuato at which every planned home had purportedly been built and sold by 31 December 2011; satellite imagery taken in March 2012 showed the site largely undeveloped, with the great majority of the supposedly sold homes never built. Investigators alleged that Homex booked sales of more than 100,000 homes that were neither built nor sold.

The settlement included a provision barring Homex from access to United States securities markets for five years. The SEC noted that the alleged fraud had occurred under the company's prior ownership and management, and that the post-bankruptcy leadership had cooperated with the investigation.

In October 2017, the SEC filed a separate civil action against four former senior officers: former chief executive Gerardo de Nicolás Gutiérrez, former chief financial officer Carlos Moctezuma Velasco, former controller Ramón Lafarga Bátiz, and former operations manager Noe Corrales Reyes. In June 2021, the U.S. District Court for the Southern District of California entered default judgments against all four. In September 2021, the SEC instituted administrative proceedings suspending Moctezuma, Lafarga and Corrales from practicing before the Commission as accountants.

== Operations ==
After emerging from bankruptcy, Homex has operated at a substantially reduced scale compared to its pre-2014 peak. The company continues to describe its business as the development, construction and sale of affordable, middle-income and residential housing in Mexico.
