= Stanza Living =

Indian student housing company

Dtwelve Spaces Private Limited
- Type: Private
- Industry: Real Estate
- Founded: 2017
- Founder: Anindya Dutta, Sandeep Dalmia
- Headquarters: New Delhi
- Area served: India
- Services: Co-Living, Student Accommodation, Serviced Rental Accommodation
- Number of employees: 1400+(2020)
- Website: www.stanzaliving.com

Stanza Living is the common brand name for Dtwelve Spaces Private Limited. It provides fully-managed shared living accommodations to students and young professionals. Founded by Anindya Dutta and Sandeep Dalmia, the company is present across 23 cities including Delhi, NCR, Bangalore, Visakhapatnam, Hyderabad, Chennai, Coimbatore, Indore, Pune, Baroda, Vijayawada, and Dehradun, Kota in India, with a capacity of 70,000 beds. Stanza Living is a technology-enabled housing concept which provides fully-furnished residences with amenities like meals, internet, laundry services, housekeeping, security and community engagement programmes. The company has an asset-light business model under which it engages in long-term lease agreements with property owners/developers, who convert their assets into shared living residences as per company guidelines. These assets are subsequently operated by Stanza Living.

== Industry background ==
A report by Cushman & Wakefield (C&W) titled 'Exploring the Student Housing Universe in India City Insights', estimates that there were over 9.08 million migrant student enrolments in India's higher educational institutions (HEIs) for the year 2018-19 who need quality accommodation facilities. According to the report, Delhi-NCR, Mumbai, and Pune are the three biggest markets for student housing in the country, and these cities require an additional 4.75 lakh beds from organized co-living operators to meet the current demand.

== History ==
Stanza Living provides tech-enabled, fully managed community living facilities for students and working professionals. The company was launched as a student housing business in Delhi NCR with a capacity of 100 beds, and grew to 14 cities by 2019. By early 2020, the company began catering to working professionals as well. The company has a combined inventory of 70,000 beds under management for both students and working professionals.

Stanza Living is currently valued at $300 million. It has raised a capital of about $70 million from leading global investors like Falcon Edge Capital, Sequoia Capital, Matrix Partners and Accel Partners.

- November 2017 – Seed funding,
- September 2018 – Series A,
- March 2019 – Debt financing,
- July 2019 – Series C round,
- December 2019 - Debt financing.

The company has invested in building technology products for business efficiency and consumer experience, like the Stanza Resident App and Stanza Real Estate App.

Stanza Living has close to 1,500 employees across India. It is recognized among Top Real Estate Tech Startups of 2020 across the globe by research and analysis company Tracxn. The company has been shortlisted among Top 25 Start-ups of India in 2019 by LinkedIn

== Founders ==
Stanza Living was co-founded by Anindya Dutta and Sandeep Dalmia. Sandeep Dalmia is an alumnus of Delhi College of Engineering and IIM Ahmedabad. Prior to Stanza, he was a Principal at Boston Consulting Group, working across India, US and South East Asia markets. Anindya Dutta was previously a Real Estate investor with Oaktree Capital and prior to that, he worked at Goldman Sachs in London. He is an alumnus of IIT Kharagpur and IIM Ahmedabad.
