= Yad Ezra V'Shulamit =

- Formation: 1998; 28 years ago
- Legal status: Non-profit
- Purpose: Food and other services for poor families in Israel
- Headquarters: Jerusalem
- Location: Israel
- Region served: Israel
- Official language: Hebrew
- Founding Director: Aryeh Lurie

Yad Ezra V'Shulamit is a Jewish charity organization located in Israel. Founded in 1988, with a mission is to feed poor and hungry families in Israel, with a special focus on providing daily hot meals for children. The organization distributes 500 tons of food each week which support 336,000 poverty stricken people in Israel per year. In addition, the organization operates Children's Centers in Jerusalem and Safed, providing daily hot lunches for children, help with homework, annual clothing and school supply drives. The motto of the organization is "Breaking the Cycle of Poverty, One Child at a Time".

== History ==
Yad Ezra V'Shulamit was founded in 1988 by Aryeh Lurie, who grew up in poverty in Jerusalem The organization is named after Lurie's parents.

== Projects ==
=== Food Basket Distributions ===
Yad Ezra V'Shulamit distributes 12,000 food baskets to families in Israel each week. Weekly food baskets contain basic necessities, such as fresh produce, bread, canned goods, and chicken for Shabbat. 62,000 food baskets are distributed to many more families for the Rosh Hashanah and Passover holidays. The organization relies on volunteers to assemble the food baskets at its central warehouse.

=== Children's Centers ===
Hundreds of children in Jerusalem and Safed attend Yad Ezra V'Shulamit's Children's Centers, where they receive a hot meal daily. Many children that come to the center are from families in which one or both parents are sick and unable to work, or they are orphans. In addition to the meal, they receive tutoring and attention from trained professionals, counselors, tutors, and volunteers.

=== Clothing Distributions ===
Yad Ezra V’Shulamit organizes winter campaigns to provide coats and blankets for children whose parents can't afford them. They also buy other winter gear such as boots, scarves, and gloves, and distribute them to needy children. Yad Ezra V'Shulamit also runs school-supply campaigns to provide children with basic necessities such as backpacks, pencils and notebooks.
