= PDG S.A. =

PDG Realty S.A. Empreendimentos e Participações
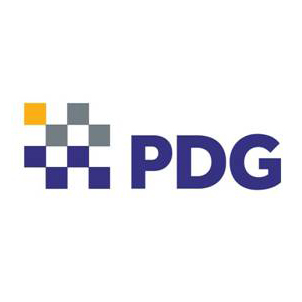
- Company type: Sociedade Anônima
- Traded as: B3: PDGR3
- Industry: Real estate & Construction
- Founded: 1979; 47 years ago
- Headquarters: Rio de Janeiro, Brazil
- Area served: Brazil
- Key people: Gilberto Sayão da Silva (Chairman), Vladimir Ranevsky (CEO)
- Products: House-building
- Revenue: US$ 2.2 billion (2013)
- Net income: US$ 114.6 (2013)
- Number of employees: 260+ (2013)
- Website: www.pdg.com.br

PDG is a Brazilian real estate development company. It is the second largest real estate and homebuilder after Cyrela Brazil Realty and is focused on the residential market. The company is based in Rio de Janeiro.

The company is present in 56 cities and 11 states within Brazil, and also has projects in Argentina. Its real estate projects include residential projects for various classes, from low to high-income properties, developing luxury condominiums and investments in ventures with a focus on generating income through leasing; developing residential lots; investing in commercial real estate projects; and commercializing residential and commercial properties.

The company is also involved in real estate brokerage and consulting business.

== History ==
The company was founded in 1979 and became publicly listed in January 2007 in the corporate index Novo Mercado of BM&F Bovespa. In 2010 it became part of the Bovespa Index, but was removed in 2016, because its shares fell by around 95%.

According to research done by law firm Tapai Advogados, the company came out as one of the lowest for customer complaints and law suits in 2013, 2014, and 2015.

The company's strategy was to grow through investments in subsidiaries and direct investment in projects.

By 2023, PDG had control of most of its consolidated capital.
