= Gafisa =

Brazilian builder and developer

Gafisa SA
- Company type: Sociedade Anônima
- Traded as: B3: GFSA3; NYSE: GFA
- Industry: Real estate and residential construction
- Founded: 1954
- Headquarters: São Paulo, Brazil
- Key people: Gary Garrabrant, (Chairman); Alceu Duilio Calciolari, (CEO)
- Products: House-building
- Revenue: ▼US$ 183.7 million (2017)
- Net income: ▲ - US$ 256.5 million (2017)
- Number of employees: 4,500
- Website: www.gafisa.com.br

Gafisa (formerly Gomes de Almeida Fernandes Imobiliária Sociedade Anonima) is the fourth largest Brazilian residential construction and real estate company. Founded in 1954, Gafisa's predecessor company is the Cimob Companhia Imobiliária (formerly known as Gafisa Participações S.A.), from whom Gafisa inherited its brand name, assets, liabilities, and market position. It is based in São Paulo, with locations across Brazil.

== History ==
Gafisa is a company that operates in the real estate sector, specializing in high-luxury residential condominiums, commercial buildings, flats, and shopping centers. It has a portfolio of over 950 enterprises, totaling approximately 10 million square meters of built area.

The company was founded in 1954 in Rio de Janeiro as "Gomes de Almeida Fernandes Ltda" and later became the property of Gafisa at the end of the 80s. In 1997, it underwent a rebranding through an association with GP Investments, resulting in its current name, Gafisa SA. A

In 2004, Gafisa established the Board of New Business to focus on expanding into markets beyond the Rio-São Paulo region.

At the beginning of 2006, Gafisa joined the New Market of Bovespa corporate governance following its initial public offering of shares. Additional changes occurred in 2006 when Gafisa received a major shareholder, Equity International Properties (EIP), which is a North American real estate investment company with expertise in Latin America. EIP is owned by Equity Group Investments (LLC), controlled by Samuel Zell. Gafisa is headquartered in São Paulo and operates in various cities throughout the country.

In 2007, Gafisa conducted a public offering of new shares, this time on the New York Stock Exchange (NYSE), becoming the first Brazilian residential real estate company to be listed on the NYSE. This milestone enhanced its position as a company committed to global standards and recognized for financial and operational excellence.

Also in the first quarter of 2007, following the diversification of regional and residential products, the company strengthened the commitment to serve the segment of low income through the establishment of Fit Residencial, subsidiary of Gafisa ventures that will develop a low price in urban areas. The first release, the Fit Jacana, occurred in March.

To tackle the low-income market, Gafisa formed a joint venture with Odebrecht, a Brazilian multinational construction company, in 2007 to construct at least 1,000 units and up to 7,000 units.

In 2008, Gafisa acquired construction company, Construtora Tenda.

In 2014, Gafisa was recognized as one of the Most Admired companies by Carta Capital magazine in the construction and development segment. The company is also included, for three consecutive years, in Exame magazine's Melhores & Maiores ranking.

In June 2016, the Public Prosecutor's Office of Maranhão ordered Gafisa and Tenda to pay R$10 million in compensation for environmental damage caused by the construction of the Grand Park I, II and III condominiums, located on Avenida dos Holandeses, in São Luís. The amount were allocated to the State Fund for the Protection of Diffuse Rights. In December 2016, Gafisa split with Construtora Tenda.
