= Range expansion index =

The range expansion index (REI) is a technical indicator used in the technical analysis of financial markets. It is intended to chart the relative strength or weakness of a trading vehicle based on the comparison of the recent price changes and the overall price changes for the period.

The REI can be classified as a momentum oscillator, measuring the velocity and magnitude of directional price movements. The REI shows overbought/oversold price conditions by measuring the relation between the sum of "strong" price changes (such that form a trend) and all price changes for the period.

The REI is most typically used on an 8 day timeframe. It changes on a scale from −100 to +100, with the overbought and oversold levels marked at +60 and −60, respectively.

The range expansion index was developed by Thomas DeMark and published in his 1994 book, The New Science of Technical Analysis.

== Calculation ==
Two sums are calculated for each day. One is the conditional sum of the "strong" price changes:

$$S1 = \sum_{j=1}^{k} n_j m_j s_j$$

where $k$ is the period of calculation (usually, 8), $n_j$ is a first condition:

  if ((High[j – 2] < Close[j - 7]) && (High[j - 2] < Close[j - 8]) && (High[j] < High[j - 5]) && (High[j] < High[j - 6])) 
  
    
      
        
          n
          
            j
          
        
        =
        0
      
    
    {\displaystyle n_{j}=0}
  

  else 
  
    
      
        
          n
          
            j
          
        
        =
        1
      
    
    {\displaystyle n_{j}=1}
  

$m_j$ is a second condition:

  if ((Low[j – 2] > Close[j – 7]) && (Low[j – 2] > Close[j – 8]) && (Low[j] > Low[j – 5]) && (Low[j] > Low[j – 6])) 
  
    
      
        
          m
          
            j
          
        
        =
        0
      
    
    {\displaystyle m_{j}=0}
  

  else 
  
    
      
        
          m
          
            j
          
        
        =
        1
      
    
    {\displaystyle m_{j}=1}
  

and $s_j$ is the price change parameter:

$$s_j = High[j] - High[j - 2] + Low[j] - Low[j - 2],\!$$

The second sum is calculated as following:

$$S2 = \sum_{j=1}^{k} |High[j] - High[j - 2]| + |Low[j] - Low[j - 2]|$$

For each trading day the value of the indicator is calculated:

$$REI = \frac{S1}{S2} 100$$

== Interpretation ==
According to Thomas DeMark, price weakness is shown by the indicator when its value rises above level 60 and then declines below it. Price strength is shown when the REI goes below −60 and then rises above that level.

== See also ==
- Relative strength index
