= Moving average envelope =

Technical analysis indicator

Moving average envelope is a technical analysis indicator, showing lines above and below a moving average.

The starting point is a simple or exponential N-period moving average which is calculated as the average of the stock price for each of the previous N periods (usually days). The moving average envelope consist of an upper envelope placed above, and a lower envelope placed below, the moving average. The distance from the moving average and the two envelopes is usually specified as a percentage.

Moving average envelopes are similar to other technical indicators, such as Bollinger Bands and Keltner channels, except that these also vary the width of the bands/channels based on a volatility measure.

Unless the envelopes are placed very close to the moving average, the current price will normally be inside the envelope. How moving average envelopes are used to influence buying or selling decisions varies. Some say that a stock price crossing above the upper envelope is a signal of strength, and thus possibly signalling further increases. Other say that this could indicate that the stock is on its way to be overbought, which would rather be a sign of weakness.
