= Keltner channel =

Chart analysis indicator

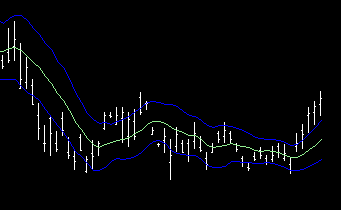
Keltner channel example

Keltner channel is a technical analysis indicator showing a central moving average line plus channel lines at a distance above and below. The indicator is named after Chester W. Keltner (1909–1998) who described it in his 1960 book How To Make Money in Commodities. This name was applied by those who heard about it from him, but Keltner called it the ten-day moving average trading rule and indeed made no claim to any originality for the idea.

In Keltner's description the center line is a 10-day simple moving average of typical price, where typical price each day is the average of high, low and close,

$$typical\ price = {high + low + close \over 3}$$

The lines above and below are drawn a distance from that center line, a distance which is the simple moving average of the past 10 days' trading ranges (i.e. range high to low on each day).

The trading strategy is to regard a close above the upper line as a strong bullish signal, or a close below the lower line as strong bearish sentiment, and buy or sell with the trend accordingly, but perhaps with other indicators to confirm.

The origin of this idea is uncertain. Keltner was a Chicago grain trader and perhaps it was common knowledge among traders of the day. Or in the 1930s as a young man, Keltner worked for Ralph Ainsworth (1884–1965) backtesting trading systems submitted when Ainsworth offered a substantial prize for a winning strategy, so it could have been among those. But ideas of channels with fixed widths go back to the earliest days of charting, so perhaps applying some averaging is not an enormous leap in any case.

Later authors, such as Linda Bradford Raschke, have published modifications for the Keltner channel, such as different averaging periods; or an exponential moving average; or using a multiple of Wilder's average true range (ATR) for the bands.

== See also ==
- Bollinger bands
