= Pivot point =

Pivot point may refer to:

- Pivot point, the center of rotation in a rotational system
  - Fulcrum (lever), the pivot point of a lever system
  - Pivot foot, in basketball
- The center of percussion of a rigid body
- Pivot point (technical analysis), a time when a market price trend changes direction

== See also ==
- Pivot (disambiguation)
- Center pin
- Rotation around a fixed axis
