= George Lane =

George Lane may refer to:

- George Lane, better known as Clubfoot George, alleged outlaw who was hanged on January 13, 1864, in Virginia City, Montana
- George Lane (British Army officer) (1915–2010), Hungarian-born British World War II commando
- George Lane (mental calculator) (born 1964), mental calculator and author
- George Lane (minister) (1842–1904), inaugural president-general of the Methodist Church of Australasia
- George Lane (musician), pseudonym for Eric Dolphy (1928–1964) on John Coltrane's Olé Coltrane album
- George Lane (politician) (1856–1925), Canadian cattle baron and legislator
- George Lane (technical analyst) (1921–2004), American technical analyst; developer of the stochastic oscillator model
- George Washington Lane (1806–1863), U.S. federal judge
- George Lane (cricketer) (1852–1917), English cricketer
- George Martin Lane (1823–1897), American scholar
- George Sherman Lane (1902–1981), American linguist
- George Lane, 1st Viscount Lanesborough (1620s–1683), Irish politician
- George W. Lane Jr. (1880–1963), American banker and political candidate
- George M. Lane (diplomat), U.S. ambassador to Yemen
- Chappy Lane (George M. Lane, died 1901), baseball player
- George E. Lane, British author; expert on Mongols in Iran
- George Lane station, original name of South Woodford tube station on the London Underground

== See also ==
- George Lane-Fox (disambiguation)
