= Force index =

The force index (FI) is an indicator used in technical analysis to illustrate how strong the actual buying or selling pressure is. High positive values mean there is a strong rising trend, and low values signify a strong downward trend.

The FI is calculated by multiplying the difference between the last and previous closing prices by the volume of the commodity, yielding a momentum scaled by the volume. The strength of the force is determined by a larger price change or by a larger volume.

The FI was created by Alexander Elder.

== Calculation and smoothing ==
The force index is commonly calculated by subtracting the previous closing price from the current closing price and multiplying the result by the current period's volume:

$$\text{Force Index} = (\text{Current close} - \text{Previous close}) \times \text{Volume}$$

For periods longer than one day, the force index is commonly calculated as an exponential moving average of the one-period force index. A 13-period force index, for example, is calculated as a 13-period exponential moving average of the one-period values.
