= Typical price =

In financial trading, typical price (sometimes called the pivot point) refers to the arithmetic average of the high, low, and closing prices for a given period.

$\text{Typical Price} = \frac{H + L + C}{3}$

For example, consider a period of one day. If the high for that day was 1.2200, the low was 1.2080, and the closing price was 1.2150, then the typical price for that day would be:

TP = (1.2200 + 1.2080 + 1.2150)/3 = 1.2143.

Typical Price is mostly used as a component in various technical studies: Pivot Point, Commodity channel index (CCI), Money Flow Index (MFI), Volume Weighted Average (VWAP).
