= Parabolic SAR =

Chart indicator

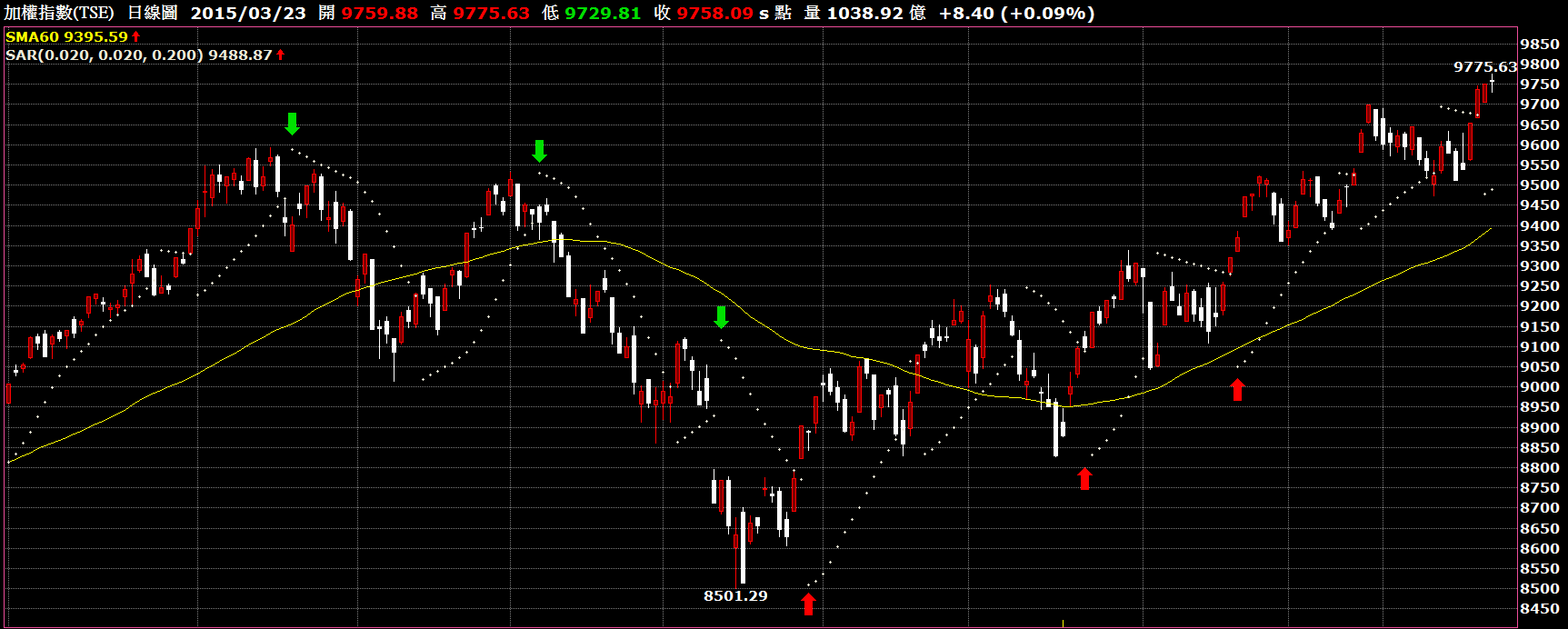

In stock and securities market technical analysis, parabolic SAR (parabolic stop and reverse) is a method devised by J. Welles Wilder Jr., to find potential reversals in the market price direction of traded goods such as securities or currency exchanges such as forex. It is a trend-following (lagging) indicator and may be used to set a trailing stop loss or determine entry or exit points based on prices tending to stay within a parabolic curve during a strong trend.

Similar to option theory's concept of time decay, the concept draws on the idea that "time is the enemy". Thus, unless a security can continue to generate more profits over time, it should be liquidated. The indicator generally works only in trending markets, and creates "whipsaws" during ranging or, sideways phases. Therefore, Wilder recommends first establishing the direction or change in direction of the trend through the use of parabolic SAR, and then using a different indicator such as the Average Directional Index to determine the strength of the trend.

A parabola below the price is generally bullish, while a parabola above is generally bearish. A parabola below the price may be used as support, whereas a parabola above the price may represent resistance.

== Construction ==
The parabolic SAR is calculated almost independently for each trend in the price. When the price is in an uptrend, the SAR emerges below the price and converges upwards towards it. Similarly, on a downtrend, the SAR emerges above the price and converges downwards. At each step within a trend, the SAR is calculated one period in advance. That is, tomorrow's SAR value is built using data available today. The general formula used for this is:

${SAR}_{n+1} = {SAR}_n + \alpha ( EP - {SAR}_n )$,

where SAR_{n} and SAR_{n+1} represent the current period and the next period's SAR values, respectively.

EP (the extreme point) is a record kept during each trend that represents the highest value reached by the price during the current uptrend – or lowest value during a downtrend. During each period, if a new maximum (or minimum) is observed, the EP is updated with that value.

The α value represents the acceleration factor. Usually, this is set initially to a value of 0.02, but can be chosen by the trader. This factor is increased by 0.02 each time a new EP is recorded, which means that every time a new EP is observed, it will make the acceleration factor go up. The rate will then quicken to a point where the SAR converges towards the price. To prevent it from getting too large, a maximum value for the acceleration factor is normally set to 0.20. The traders can set these numbers depending on their trading style and the instruments being traded. Generally, it is preferable in stocks trading to set the acceleration factor to 0.01, so that it is not too sensitive to local decreases. For commodity or currency trading, the preferred value is 0.02.

The SAR is calculated in this manner for each new period. However, two special cases will modify the SAR value:

- If the next period's SAR value is inside (or beyond) the current period or the previous period's price range, the SAR must be set to the closest price bound. For example, if in an upward trend, the new SAR value is calculated and if it results to be more than today's or yesterday's lowest price, it must be set equal to that lower boundary.
- If the next period's SAR value is inside (or beyond) the next period's price range, a new trend direction is then signaled. The SAR must then switch sides.

Upon a trend switch, the first SAR value for this new trend is set to the last EP recorded on the prior trend, EP is then reset accordingly to this period's maximum, and the acceleration factor is reset to its initial value of 0.02.

== Statistical results ==
A modern study of parabolic SAR based on 2,880 years of backtesting over a 12-year period to 2023 on the Dow Jones Industrial Average 30 stocks, demonstrated using PSAR with a standard OHLC chart resulted in a 19% win rate. Using PSAR with a Heikin Ashi chart produced a 63% success rate.
