= Temporal mean =

The temporal mean is the arithmetic mean of a series of values over a time period. Assuming equidistant measuring or sampling times, it can be computed as the sum of the values over a period divided by the number of values. A simple moving average can be considered to be a sequence of temporal means over periods of equal duration. (If the time variable is continuous, the average value during the time period is the integral over the period divided by the length of the duration of the period.)

== See also ==
Moving average
