= True strength index =

Technical indicator used in the analysis of financial markets

The true strength index (TSI) is a technical indicator used in the analysis of financial markets that attempts to show both trend direction and overbought/oversold conditions. It was first published by William Blau in 1991. The indicator uses moving averages of the underlying momentum of a financial instrument. Momentum is considered a leading indicator of price movements, and a moving average characteristically lags behind price. The TSI combines these characteristics to create an indication of price and direction more in sync with market turns than either momentum or moving average. The TSI is provided as part of the standard collection of indicators offered by various trading platforms.

== Calculations ==
The TSI is a "double smoothed" indicator; meaning that a moving average applied to the data (daily momentum in this case) is smoothed again by a second moving average. The calculation for TSI uses exponential moving averages. The formula for the TSI is:

$$TSI(m,r,s) = 100 \frac{EMA(EMA(m,r),s)}{EMA(EMA(|m|,r),s)}$$

where

c_{0} = today's closing price
m = c_{0} − c_{1} = momentum (difference between today's and yesterday's close)
EMA(m,n) = exponential moving average of m over n periods, that is,

$$EMA(m_0,n)=\frac{2}{n+1}\left[m_0-EMA(m_1,n)\right]+EMA(m_1,n)$$

r = EMA smoothing period for momentum, typically 25
s = EMA smoothing period for smoothed momentum, typically 13

== Interpretation ==
While the TSI output is bound between +100 and −100, most values fall between +25 and −25. Blau suggests interpreting these values as overbought and oversold levels, respectively, at which point a trader may anticipate a market turn. Trend direction is indicated by the slope of the TSI; a rising TSI suggests an up-trend in the market, and a falling TSI suggests a down-trend.

== See also ==
- Relative Strength Index
