= Stochastic oscillator =

Market momentum indicator

Stochastic oscillator is a momentum indicator within technical analysis that uses support and resistance levels as an oscillator. George Lane developed this indicator in the late 1950s. The term stochastic refers to the point of a current price in relation to its price range over a period of time. This method attempts to predict price turning points by comparing the closing price of a security to its price range.

The 5-period stochastic oscillator in a daily timeframe is defined as follows:

$$\%K     = 100\times\frac{\mathrm{Price}-\mathrm{Low}_5}{\mathrm{High}_5-\mathrm{Low}_5}$$

$\%D_N = \frac {\%K_1+\%K_2+\%K_3+...\%K_N}{N}$

where $\mathrm{High}_5$ and $\mathrm{Low}_5$ are the highest and lowest prices in the last 5 days respectively, while %D is the N-day moving average of %K (the last N values of %K). Usually this is a simple moving average, but can be an exponential moving average for a less standardized weighting for more recent values. There is only one valid signal in working with %D alone — a divergence between %D and the analyzed security.

== Calculation ==
The calculation above finds the range between an asset's high and low price during a given period of time. The current security's price is then expressed as a percentage of this range with 0% indicating the bottom of the range and 100% indicating the upper limits of the range over the time period covered. The idea behind this indicator is that prices tend to close near the extremes of the recent range before turning points. The Stochastic oscillator is calculated:

$\%K = \frac {\mathrm{Price}-\mathrm{Low}_N}{\mathrm{High}_N-\mathrm{Low}_N}\times 100$

$\%D = \frac {\%K_1+\%K_2+\%K_3}{3}$

Where

$\mathrm{Price}$ is the last closing price
$\mathrm{Low}_N$ is the lowest price over the last N periods
$\mathrm{High}_N$ is the highest price over the last N periods
$\%D$ is a 3-period simple moving average of %K, $\mathrm{SMA}_3(\%K)$.
$\%D\mathrm{-Slow}$ is a 3-period simple moving average of %D, $\mathrm{SMA}_3(\%D)$.

A 3-line Stochastics will give an anticipatory signal in %K, a signal in the turnaround of %D at or before a bottom, and a confirmation of the turnaround in %D-Slow. Typical values for N are 5, 9, or 14 periods. Smoothing the indicator over 3 periods is standard.

According to George Lane, the Stochastics indicator is to be used with cycles, Elliott Wave Theory and Fibonacci retracement for timing. In low margin, calendar futures spreads, one might use Wilders parabolic as a trailing stop after a stochastics entry. A centerpiece of his teaching is the divergence and convergence of trendlines drawn on stochastics, as diverging/converging to trendlines drawn on price cycles. Stochastics predicts tops and bottoms.

== Interpretation ==
The signal to act is when there is a divergence-convergence, in an extreme area, with a crossover on the right hand side, of a cycle bottom. As plain crossovers can occur frequently, one typically waits for crossovers occurring together with an extreme pullback, after a peak or trough in the %D line. If price volatility is high, an exponential moving average of the %D indicator may be taken, which tends to smooth out rapid fluctuations in price.

Stochastics attempts to predict turning points by comparing the closing price of a security to its price range. Prices tend to close near the extremes of the recent range just before turning points. In the case of an uptrend, prices tend to make higher highs, and the settlement price usually tends to be in the upper end of that time period's trading range. When the momentum starts to slow, the settlement prices will start to retreat from the upper boundaries of the range, causing the stochastic indicator to turn down at or before the final price high.

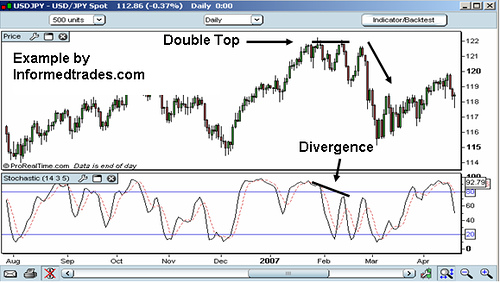
Stochastic divergence

An alert or set-up is present when the %D line is in an extreme area and diverging from the price action. The actual signal takes place when the faster % K line crosses the % D line.

Divergence-convergence is an indication that the momentum in the market is waning and a reversal may be in the making. The chart below illustrates an example of where a divergence in stochastics, relative to price, forecasts a reversal in the price's direction.

An event known as "stochastic pop" occurs when prices break out and keep going. This is interpreted as a signal to increase the current position, or liquidate if the direction is against the current position.

== See also ==
- MACD
- Relative Strength Index (RSI)
- Williams %R – Equivalent of %K, mirrored around the 0%-axis
- Detrended price oscillator
