= John Bollinger =

American author and financial analyst

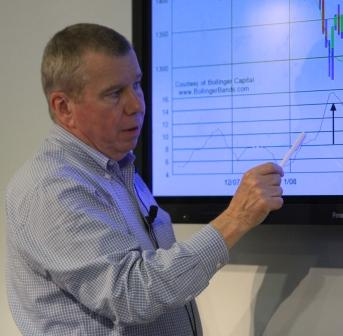
- Born: May 27, 1950 (age 76); Montpelier, Vermont, U.S.
- Occupations: Finance author, financial analyst
- Writing career
- Notable work: Bollinger on Bollinger Bands (2001)
- Notable awards: (1995) Technical Securities Analysts of San Francisco Lifetime Award (2005) Market Technicians Association Annual Award (2015) IFTA Lifetime Achievement Award

John A. Bollinger (/ˈbɒlɪndʒər/; born 1950) is an American author, financial analyst, contributor to the field of technical analysis and the developer of Bollinger Bands. His book Bollinger on Bollinger Bands (2001), has been translated into eleven languages. (Note: Chinese (simplified and traditional), French, German, Italian, Japanese, Korean, Lithuanian, Russian, Spanish and Turkish.) Since 1987, he has published the Capital Growth Letter, a newsletter which provides technical analysis of the financial markets.

== Bollinger Bands ==
Bollinger Bands are intervals drawn on a price chart that define high and low on a relative basis, widely used in technical analysis to assess price volatility and potential trading opportunities. Bollinger started developing Bollinger Bands in the early 1980s while trading options, with much of his analytics focused on volatility. At the time, fixed-width trading bands were common, but Bollinger's contribution was to use volatility standard deviation to make trading bands adaptive.

When Bollinger first introduced the concept to the public on Financial News Network, they had no name. During the program, the interviewer pointed to the bands and inquired as to what they were; Bollinger replied, "Let's call them Bollinger Bands."

== Rational Analysis ==
"John Bollinger, CMT, CFA, has always concentrated on the overlap between technical and fundamental analysis, rather than focus on the differences. To bridge the gap between fundamental and technical analysis, Bollinger advocates an approach he calls 'Rational Analysis'". Bollinger first coined the term "Rational Analysis" in the late 1980s. He then defined it as the "juncture of the overlap between technical and fundamental analysis" and created a visual representation.

At the 2004 AIMR Conference, in his presentation titled Combining Technical and Fundamental Analysis, he took his concept one step further. Because the financial analysis community sub-categorizes itself in ever finer specialty groups, his updated definition of Rational Analysis was stated as "the union of the sets of technical, fundamental, quantitative and behavioral analysis".

The analogy Bollinger uses for Rational Analysis is having multiple tool kits each with different tools. To get the job done the rational approach is to take the tool that does the job best, regardless of which tool kit it comes from. The same is true for financial analysis. Depending on the analytical scenario, sometimes technical analysis tools provide the best insights. Sometimes fundamental analysis, behavioral analysis or quantitative analysis; and most often a combination of all four is the most rigorous and productive.

== Computerized technical analysis ==
After purchasing his first microcomputer in 1977, Bollinger became involved in the seminal stages of computer-driven technical analysis. Computer technology allowed Bollinger to develop Group Power, an industry group ranking system that shows developing trends in industry groups and sectors. Over the years the service evolved, the underlying structure becoming a proprietary equal-weighted industry group structure and delivery via the Internet allowed ever more complex analytics.

In 1996 Bollinger recognized the potential of the Internet for financial analysis and began the programming for equitytrader.com. The service utilized a 52 rule fuzzy logic model to provide analytics of the US equities market and was one of earliest charting and technical analysis websites.

== Professional life ==
After becoming an independent trader in 1980 he joined the Financial News Network where he was the Chief Market Analyst for seven years, 1984–1990, a role in which he was responsible for the technical analysis content presented on air. After FNN's acquisition by NBC, Bollinger helped with the transition to CNBC and continued to provide commentary on a regular basis. He founded an investment firm, Bollinger Capital Management. Bollinger is both a CFA Chartered Financial Analyst and CMT Chartered Market Technician and was the first financial analyst to earn both designations. He is also the founding president of Market Analysts of Southern California. Bollinger continues to act as chief executive and leader of Bollinger Capital Management.

== Board memberships ==
Bollinger served on the board of the Market Technicians Association (MTA) for ten years (1988-1997), on the board of International Federation of Technical Analysts (IFTA) for five years (1998-2003) and on the board of the Market Technicians Association Education Foundation (MTAEF) from 2008 through 2012.

== Professional affiliations ==
- CFA Institute
- Technical Securities Analysts Association
- Market Technicians Association

== Books ==
- Bollinger, John (2001). Bollinger on Bollinger Bands. McGraw Hill. ISBN 978-0-07-137368-5.
