= Gary Shilling =

American financial analyst and commentator

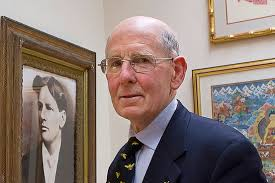
- Born: May 25, 1937 (age 89); Fremont, Ohio, United States
- Education: Amherst College (BA in physics); Stanford University (MA and PhD in economics)
- Occupations: financial analyst and commentator
- Notable work: “The Housing Bubble Will Probably Burst” (January 2006)

A. Gary Shilling (born May 25, 1937) is an American financial analyst and commentator who appears regularly in publications such as Forbes, The New York Times, and The Wall Street Journal. He is president of A. Gary Shilling & Co., Inc., editor of A. Gary Shilling's Insight, and a member of the Nihon Keizai Shimbun Board of Economists. He is featured frequently on business shows on radio and television, and as a recognised orator, addresses conventions of global business groups like the Young Presidents' Organization. More than two years before the housing bubble burst, Shilling warned that subprime loans were probably "the greatest financial problem" for the future U.S. economy, and in January 2006, prior to the Great Recession, he wrote an article entitled: “The Housing Bubble Will Probably Burst”. In 2007 he correctly prophesied that housing would "sink the economy".

== Biography ==
Shilling was awarded a bachelor's degree in physics from Amherst College, and an MA and PhD in economics from Stanford University. He has worked for Thornhill Securities, the Federal Reserve Bank of San Francisco, Merrill Lynch, White Weld & Co., and Standard Oil of New Jersey.

In the spring of 1969, he was one of only a few analysts who correctly envisioned the recession at year's-end, and was almost a lone voice in 1973, when he forecast a monolithic international inventory-building fling, followed by the first significant recession since the Great Depression.

In the late 1970s, while most analysts presumed that waxing inflation would go on unabated, Shilling was the first to predict that America's infirm political climate would impede it. He also foresaw various dangerous economic readjustment problems and a shift in investment strategy from a preference for tangible assets to an increased emphasis on stocks and bonds. He was named Top Commodity Trading Advisor by Futures Magazine in 1993 and Wall Street Top Economist (1975 and 1976) by Institutional Investor Magazine.

More than two years before the housing bubble burst, Shilling warned that subprime loans were probably "the greatest financial problem" for the future U.S. economy, and in January 2006, prior to the Great Recession, he wrote an article entitled: “The Housing Bubble Will Probably Burst” in A. Gary Shilling's Insight. In 2007 he correctly prophesied that housing would "sink the economy".

In June 2011, he predicted a 20% drop in housing in 2012 with a resulting global recession. In October 2012 he predicted a global recession in 2013.

In August 2015, he predicted that the price of oil "is headed for $10 to $20 per barrel" (it was $43/barrel at the time) due to higher productivity through fracking and OPEC not limiting production.
