= George Fox (disambiguation) =

George Fox was a founder of the Religious Society of Friends (Quakers).

George Fox may also refer to:

== People ==
- George L. Fox (clown) (1825–1877), American comedian
- George L. Fox (chaplain) (1900–1943), American Methodist minister and soldier
- George L. Fox (politician), American lawyer, judge, and politician from New York
- George E. Fox (born 1945), biologist, co-discoverer of Archaea
- George Fox (singer) (born 1960), Canadian singer/songwriter
  - George Fox (album), 1988
- George Henry Fox (1846–1937), American dermatologist
- George Fox (physician) (1759–1828), physician
- George Fox (poet) (1809–1880), Irish poet
- George Fox (baseball) (1868–1914), 19th-century baseball player
- George Fox (cricketer) (1867–1920), New Zealand cricketer
- George Fox (Australian politician) (1835–1914), member of the Queensland Legislative Assembly
- George Fox (priest) (1913–1978), British Anglican priest and military chaplain
- George Malcolm Fox (1843–1918), Inspector General of Gymnasia for the British Army at Aldershot
- George Benson Fox, United States Army officer, industrialist, and politician

== Educational institutions ==
- George Fox Evangelical Seminary, Oregon
- George Fox University, Oregon

== See also ==
- George Lane-Fox (disambiguation)
