= TSI =

TSI may refer to:

== Science, technology and engineering ==
- Technology Schools Initiative
- Thyroid stimulating immunoglobulin
- Time-slot interchange, communications network switches
- Total solar irradiance received at top of atmosphere
- Triple sugar iron test or TSI slant, of a microorganism's ability to ferment sugars
- Trophic state index of plant nutrients in waterbodies
- Turbo fuel stratified injection, a VW engine trademark TSI or TFSI

== Standards, and standards organisations ==
- Technical Specifications for Interoperability within European railways
- Trading Standards Institute, a British professional association
- Trustworthy Software Initiative, UK
- Turkish Standards Institution, a public standards organization in Turkey

== Companies ==
- TekSavvy Solutions Inc., Canadian telecommunications company
- Telesensory Systems Inc., maker of products for the blind
- Town Sports International, an operator of fitness facilities

== Organisations ==
- The Seasteading Institute, for creating dwellings on seaborne platforms in international waters
- Three Seas Initiative, European intergovernmental group

== Media and entertainment ==
- Televisione svizzera di lingua italiana, Swiss Italian-language TV

== Other uses ==
- Texas Success Initiative, a guide for developmental education to ensure college readiness in the state of Texas
- Time in Turkey, generally abbreviated with its usage in Turkish, Türkiye Saati İle (transl. With Turkey Time)
- Tissue saturation index in medical near-infrared spectroscopy
- Total system inertia of an electrical grid
- True strength index of financial markets
- Trauma Symptom Inventory, a psychological assessment instrument
- Torres Strait Islanders, an indigenous people of Australia
- Torres Strait Islands, a group of islands in Australia
