= J. Welles Wilder Jr. =

American mechanical engineer and real estate developer (1935–2021)

John Welles Wilder Jr.
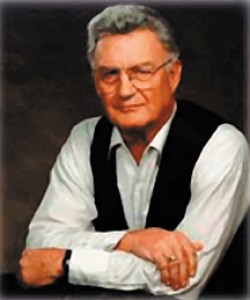
- Born: June 11, 1935; Norris, Tennessee, U.S.
- Died: April 18, 2021 (aged 85); Christchurch, New Zealand
- Occupations: mechanical engineer, turned real estate developer
- Known for: Average true range, Relative strength index, Average directional movement index, Parabolic SAR

John Welles Wilder Jr. (June 11, 1935 – April 18, 2021) was an American mechanical engineer, turned real estate developer. He is best known, however, for his work in technical analysis. Wilder is the father of several technical indicators that are now considered to be the core tenets of technical analysis software. These include Average True Range, the Relative Strength Index (RSI), Average Directional Index, and the Parabolic SAR.

== Life ==
John Welles Wilder was born June 11, 1935, in Norris, Tennessee. The oldest of four children to John Welles "Jack" Wilder, Sr., and Frances Green Wilder, his brother was former NFL defensive tackle and defensive end Albert Green "Bert" Wilder (April 14, 1939 – December 5, 2012).

After serving in the Korean War in the US Navy, Wilder attended North Carolina State University in Raleigh, graduating with a degree in Mechanical Engineering in 1962. He married Eleanor Dawn Barefoot on July 6, 1958. They had three children: John Welles "Johnny" Wilder III (April 22, 1959 – March 25, 2020), Catharine Cooper, and David Wilder, settling in Greensboro, North Carolina. After a successful real estate practice, he founded Trend Research LTD, and its primary subsidiary, The Delta Society. He then published New Concepts in Technical Trading Systems in 1978.

Wilder and his wife Dawn retired and relocated to Christchurch, New Zealand in October 1999, becoming dual citizens shortly thereafter. While in retirement, he continued with system development until 2008.

In 2020, Wilder was diagnosed with vascular dementia and Alzheimer's disease, having shown symptoms for the better part of the 2010s.

John Welles Wilder Jr. died on April 18, 2021, in Christchurch at the age of 85.

== Books ==
- Wilder, J. Welles (1978). New Concepts in Technical Trading Systems. Trend Research. ISBN 9780894590276.
- Wilder, J. Welles (1987). The Adam Theory of Markets or What Matters Is Profit. Trend Research. ISBN 9789997619730.
- Wilder, J. Welles (1989). The Wisdom of the Ages in Acquiring Wealth. Cavida. ISBN 9780974645803.
- Wilder, J. Welles (1991). The Delta Phenomenon, Or, The Hidden Order in All Markets. Delta Society International. ISBN 9789992823262.

== Indicators ==
In his 1978 book, New Concepts in Technical Trading Systems, Wilder introduced six popular technical indicators:

- Commodity Selection Index (CSI)
- Average Directional Movement Index (DMI)
- Parabolic SAR
- Relative Strength Index (RSI)
- Swing Index
- Volatility Index

== Accolades ==
- Forbes Magazine (October 1980) singled out Mr. Wilder as "the premier technical trader publishing his work today."
- Barron's (July 1984) stated that: "In 1978, the basis of mathematical analysis was expanded when J. Welles Wilder, Jr. published New Concepts in Technical Trading Systems.
- Financial World (July 1985) said that, "Over the years, Wilder has developed more accurate commodity trading systems and concepts than any other expert."

== Famous quotes ==
1. "Letting your emotions override your plan or system is the biggest cause of failure."
2. "Some traders are born with an innate discipline. Most have to learn it the hard way."
3. "If you can't deal with emotion, get out of trading."
