= Pivoting =

Pivoting may refer to:

- The act of finding a pivot element
- A type of computer security exploit
- Pivoting (TV series), a 2022 Fox comedy series

== See also ==
- Pivot (disambiguation)
