= Relative strength =

Financial ratio

Relative strength (RS), also called comparative relative strength or the price relative, is a ratio of a stock price performance to a market average (index) performance. It is used in technical analysis to compare a security with a benchmark index, a sector, or another security.

== Calculation ==
The relative strength of a security A against a benchmark B at time t is the ratio of their prices:

$$\mathrm{RS}(t) = \frac{P_A(t)}{P_B(t)}$$

Its absolute value depends on the two price levels and cannot be compared across different pairs; only its direction matters. To make the line easier to read, both series are often rebased so that the ratio equals 100 on the start date:

$$\mathrm{RS}_{100}(t) = 100 \cdot \frac{P_A(t)/P_A(0)}{P_B(t)/P_B(0)}$$

A value of 100 then means that the two have performed equally since the start date.

Some sources instead divide the percentage change of the stock over a period by the percentage change of the index over the same period.

== Interpretation ==
A rising line means that the security is outperforming the benchmark, a falling line that it is underperforming, and a flat line that both prices are moving in the same proportion. Relative strength can rise while both prices fall, if the security falls less than the benchmark. The indicator therefore measures relative performance only and says nothing by itself about the direction of prices.

The ratio line can be analysed with the same tools used on prices, such as support and resistance levels and channels. The comparison is most meaningful between assets with a clear economic link; when the two are priced in different currencies, the exchange rate becomes a third variable that distorts the ratio.

== Moving averages ==
Top: stock A and index B rebased to 100. Bottom: relative strength A/B × 100 with its 20- and 50-period moving averages. In the grey band both prices fall, but A falls less, so relative strength rises. Simulated data.

Because the line is noisy from day to day, one or more moving averages are often plotted on it. While the line stays above a long-term average, outperformance is the prevailing trend; a break below the average signals the start of a period of underperformance. With two averages of different length, a crossover of the short average through the long one is read the same way: downward it confirms that the security has started to lag the benchmark, upward that it has started to lead it again. Like all moving-average signals, the crossover lags the turn in the line itself.

== Use in stock selection ==
Relative strength is used to find the stocks or sectors that are outperforming the market, for example by comparing a sector index with the broad market index. In 1967 Robert A. Levy studied a related but different measure, the ratio of a stock's price to its own average over the previous six months, and found that the stocks with the highest values tended to outperform in the following months. Later academic research, starting with Jegadeesh and Titman (1993), studies this effect under the name of momentum.

== Relative Rotation Graph ==
Relative Rotation Graphs (RRG) show the relative strength and momentum of mood swings in the market compared to benchmarks. The "JdK RS-Ratio" (relative strength, RS) was developed by Julius de Kempenaer, a sellside analyst in The Netherlands.

== Comparison with the relative strength index ==
Relative strength compares the performance of one security, sector, or market with another, usually by dividing the price of the first by the price of a benchmark or comparison asset. This produces a ratio line that rises when the first asset is outperforming the comparison asset and falls when it is underperforming.

The relative strength index is a different technical indicator. It is a momentum oscillator that measures the speed and magnitude of recent price movements of a single security, rather than comparing that security directly with a benchmark. The two terms are therefore related in name but measure different concepts in technical analysis.
