= ADX =

ADX, AdX, Adx, etc. may refer to:

== Business ==
- Abu Dhabi Securities Exchange
- Adams Express Company (stock symbol ADX)
- Average directional movement index, a technical indicator of trend strength in prices of a financial instrument such as a stock or bond
- DoubleClick Ad Exchange (AdX), an ad exchange platform merged into Google Ad Manager

== Science and technology ==
- ADX (file format), a streamed audio format
- Intel ADX, add-carry instruction extensions in the x86 microprocessor architecture
- Adrenalectomy, the surgical removal of one or both adrenal glands or the state of having had one or both removed
- Adrenal ferredoxin, a small iron-sulfur protein in animals including humans
- Authenticated Data Experiment, an early release of Bluesky's decentralized social network protocol
- Azure Data Explorer, a cloud-based data analytics service

== Other uses ==
- Acura ADX, a subcompact luxury crossover SUV
- The Adicts, a British punk band, sometimes written ADX
- Administrative maximum or "supermax" prisons in the US
  - United States Penitentiary, Florence ADX, the federal supermax prison in Florence, Colorado
- Alpha Delta Chi, an American nation-wide Christian sorority
- Amdo Tibetan language, from its SIL language code
- Leuchars Station in Scotland, UK (formerly RAF Leuchars) (IATA airport code ADX)
