= Accumulation/distribution index =

Technical analysis indicator

The accumulation/distribution line or accumulation/distribution index in the stock market, is a technical analysis indicator intended to relate price and volume, which supposedly acts as a leading indicator of price movements. It provides a measure of the commitment of bulls and bears to the market and is used to detect divergences between volume and price action - signs that a trend is weakening.

== Formula ==
$$CLV = { (close - low) - (high - close) \over high - low }$$

This ranges from -1 when the close is the low of the day, to +1 when it's the high. For instance if the close is 3/4 the way up the range then CLV is +0.5. The accumulation/distribution index adds up volume multiplied by the CLV factor, i.e.

$$accdist = accdist_{prev} + volume \times CLV$$

The starting point for the acc/dist total, i.e. the zero point, is arbitrary, only the shape of the resulting indicator is used, not the actual level of the total.

The name accumulation/distribution comes from the idea that during accumulation buyers are in control and the price will be bid up through the day, or will make a recovery if sold down, in either case more often finishing near the day's high than the low. The opposite applies during distribution.

The accumulation/distribution index is similar to on balance volume, but acc/dist is based on the close within the day's range, instead of the close-to-close up or down that the latter uses.

== Chaikin oscillator ==
A Chaikin oscillator is formed by subtracting a 10-day exponential moving average from a 3-day exponential moving average of the accumulation/distribution index. Being an indicator of an indicator, it can give various sell or buy signals, depending on the context and other indicators.

== Similar indicators ==
Other Price × Volume indicators:

- Money Flow
- On-balance Volume
- Price and Volume Trend

== See also ==
- Dimensional analysis - explains why volume and price are multiplied (not divided) in such indicators
- Glossary of stock market terms
- Modeling and analysis of financial markets
