= Average directional movement index =

Financial indicator

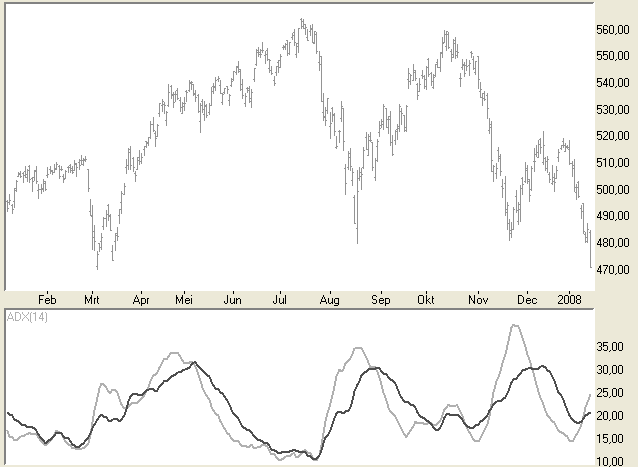
ADX Indicator.

The average directional movement index (ADX) was developed in 1978 by J. Welles Wilder as an indicator of trend strength in a series of prices of a financial instrument. ADX has become a widely used indicator for technical analysts, and is provided as a standard in collections of indicators offered by various trading platforms.

== Calculations ==
The ADX is calculated from two indicators developed by Wilder: the positive directional indicator ($DI^{+}$) and the negative directional indicator ($DI^{-}$).

Let $H_t$, $L_t$, and $C_t$ denote the high, low, and closing prices in period $t$, respectively. Define the upward and downward movements as

$$U_t=H_t-H_{t-1},
\qquad
D_t=L_{t-1}-L_t.$$

The positive and negative directional movements are

$$DM_t^{+}=
\begin{cases}
U_t, & \text{if } U_t>D_t \text{ and } U_t>0,\\
0, & \text{otherwise},
\end{cases}$$

and

$$DM_t^{-}=
\begin{cases}
D_t, & \text{if } D_t>U_t \text{ and } D_t>0,\\
0, & \text{otherwise}.
\end{cases}$$

For a sequence $X_t$, write $S_n[X]_t$ for Wilder's $n$-period smoothed moving average. It is initialized with the arithmetic mean of the first $n$ available observations and subsequently calculated recursively as

$$S_n[X]_t
=
\frac{(n-1)S_n[X]_{t-1}+X_t}{n}.$$

Wilder originally used $n=14$ periods.

The true range is

$$TR_t=
\max\left\{
H_t-L_t,\,
\left|H_t-C_{t-1}\right|,\,
\left|L_t-C_{t-1}\right|
\right\},$$

and the average true range is

$$ATR_t=S_n[TR]_t.$$

The directional indicators are

$$DI_t^{+}
=
100\,\frac{S_n[DM^{+}]_t}{ATR_t},
\qquad
DI_t^{-}
=
100\,\frac{S_n[DM^{-}]_t}{ATR_t}.$$

The directional index is

$$DX_t=
100\,\frac{\left|DI_t^{+}-DI_t^{-}\right|}
{DI_t^{+}+DI_t^{-}}.$$

Finally, the ADX is obtained by smoothing the directional index:

$$ADX_t=S_n[DX]_t.$$

Thus, after initialization with the arithmetic mean of the first $n$ available values of $DX_t$, subsequent values satisfy

$$ADX_t=
\frac{(n-1)ADX_{t-1}+DX_t}{n}.$$

The ratio formulas above apply when their denominators are nonzero.

Variations of the calculation use other moving averages, including an exponential moving average, a weighted moving average, or an adaptive moving average.

== Interpretation ==
The ADX does not indicate trend direction or momentum, only trend strength. It is a lagging indicator; that is, a trend must have established itself before the ADX will generate a signal that a trend is under way. ADX will range between 0 and 100. Generally, ADX readings below 20 indicate a weak trend, while readings above 40 indicate a strong trend. An exceptionally strong trend is typically indicated by readings above 50. Alternative interpretations have also been proposed and adopted by technical analysts. For example, ADX has been described as a reliable coincident indicator of classical chart pattern development, with readings below 20 often occurring shortly before pattern breakouts. The value of the ADX is proportional to the slope of the trend. The slope of the ADX line is proportional to the acceleration of the price movement (changing trend slope). If the trend is a constant slope then the ADX value tends to flatten out.

== Timing ==
Various market timing methods have been devised using ADX. One of these methods is discussed by Alexander Elder in his book Trading for a Living. One of the best buy signals is when ADX turns up when below both Directional Lines and +DI is above -DI. You would sell when ADX turns back down.
