= Rising moving average =

Technical indicator used in stock market trading

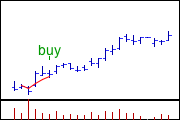
3-day Rising moving average on a 5-day close-price weighted moving average

The rising moving average is a technical indicator used in stock market trading. Most commonly found visually, the pattern is spotted with a moving average overlay on a stock chart or price series. When the moving average has been rising consecutively for a number of days, this is used as a buy signal, to indicate a rising trend forming.

While the rising moving average indicator is commonly used by investors without realising, there has been significant backtesting on historic stock data to calculate the performance of the rising moving average. Simulations have found that shorter rising averages, within the 3- to 10-day period, are more profitable overall than longer rising averages (e.g. 20 days). These have only been tested on US equity stocks however.
