= George Lane (technical analyst) =

American securities trader

- Born: 1921
- Died: July 7, 2004 (aged 82–83)
- Occupation(s): Trader, author, educator, speaker, and technical analyst
- Known for: stochastic oscillator

George Lane (1921 – July 7, 2004) was a securities trader, author, educator, speaker and technical analyst. He was part of a group of futures traders in Chicago who developed the stochastic oscillator (also known as "Lane's stochastics"), which is one of the core indicators used today among technical analysts. Lane was also President of Investment Educators Inc. in Watseka, Illinois, where he taught investors and financial professionals basic and advanced technical analysis methods. He popularized the stochastic oscillator.

== Education ==
George Lane had "an extensive academic background," having attended Drake University, Washington and Lee University, Northwestern University, The Academy, The Citadel, The College of William & Mary, and The New School.

== Career ==
Lane began his 50-year career in the financial markets with the E.F. Hutton & Co. brokerage in the 1950s. His broker's training included time spent under the tutelage of Joseph Granville. Later, George Lane joined the research group at Investment Educators, the firm he would eventually own.

== Stochastics ==
A March 2007 article quoted George Lane's description of his famous indicator: "Stochastics measures the momentum of price. If you visualize a rocket going up in the air – before it can turn down, it must slow down. Momentum always changes direction before price."

As prices move down, the close of the day has a tendency to crowd the lower portion of the daily range. Just before you get to the absolute price low, the market does not have as much push as it did. The closes no longer crowd the bottom of the daily range. Therefore, Stochastics turns up at or before the final price low.
