= Pivot =

Pivot may refer to:

- Pivot, the point of rotation in a lever system
- More generally, the center point of any rotational system
- Pivot joint, a kind of joint between bones in the body
- Pivot turn, a dance move

== Companies ==
- Incitec Pivot, Australian chemicals and explosives manufacturer
- Pivot (company), former Australian chemicals and explosives manufacturer
- Pivot Legal Society, a legal advocacy organization based in Vancouver, British Columbia
- Pivot Wireless, a cell phone service, created by a joint venture between Sprint and multiple cable companies

== Computing ==
- Apache Pivot, an open-source platform for building applications in Java
- Microsoft Live Labs Pivot, a data search application
- Morrow Pivot and Morrow Pivot II, early laptop computers
- Pivot, an element of the quicksort algorithm
- Pivot display, a display which can change orientation
- Pivot Stickfigure Animator, stick-figure animation software
- Pivot table, a data summarization tool in spreadsheets
- Pivotal Games, a former UK video game developer
- Pivoting, a computer security exploit used by hackers to use a compromised computer for attacks

== Linguistics ==
- Syntactic pivot, the argument of the verb around which the sentence revolves
- Pivot language, an artificial or natural language used as an intermediary language for translation

== Mathematics ==
- Pivot element, a non-zero element of a matrix selected by an algorithm
- Pivotal quantity, in statistics

== Music ==
- Pivot, the former name of the experimental rock band PVT
- Pivot (album), by Amoeba
- Pivot chord, a chord that is diatonic to more than one key or, in other words, is common to two keys

== Places ==
- Mount Pivot, a mountain in the western part of the Shackleton Range
- Pivot Area or Heartland, the theme of The Geographical Pivot of History
- Pivot Peak, the highest point in Wilkniss Mountains, Victoria Land

== Sports ==
- Pivot, a player position in futsal
- Pivot, a player position in roller derby
- Pivot, a player position in team handball
- Pivot, another term for five-eighth, one of the rugby league positions
- Pivot, another term for fly-half, one of the rugby union positions
- Pivot or center (basketball), a player position in basketball
- Pivot turn (skiing), a technique of turning in place in skiing
- In baseball, the action of a second baseman on an infield double play in making the turn from catching to throwing

== Other uses ==
- Pivot, a lean startup method for developing businesses and products by changing direction
- Pivot point (stock market), a price point in the financial, commodity, and securities markets
- Pivot of the Universe, a 1997 history book by Abbas Amanat
- Pivot (card game), a casual card game released by Wizards of the Coast in 1998
- Kakekotoba, or pivot word, a technique in Japanese poetry
- Bernard Pivot (1935–2024), French journalist
- "The Geographical Pivot of History" by H.J. Mackinder
- Pivot (TV network), a defunct American digital cable and satellite television network
- USS Pivot
- Center-pivot irrigation, a method of crop irrigation

== See also ==
- Center pin
- Pivotal (disambiguation)
