= Larry R. Williams =

American investor and author (born 1942)

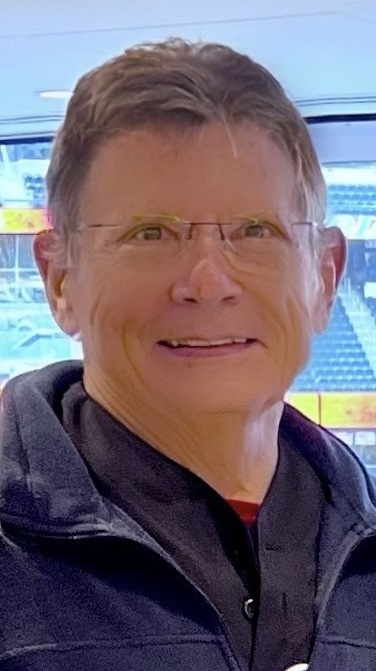
- Williams in 2023
- Born: October 6, 1942 (age 83); Miles City, Montana, U.S.
- Education: University of Oregon
- Occupations: Author, stock and commodity trader, politician
- Notable work: Williams %R, Ultimate Oscillator
- Political party: Republican
- Spouse: Carla Williams
- Children: 5, including Michelle
- Awards: Significant Sig
- Website: www.ireallytrade.com

Larry Richard Williams (born October 6, 1942) is an American author, stock and commodity trader, and 1970s–80s political candidate in the state of Montana. He is the father of actress Michelle Williams.

== Early life ==
Williams was born on October 6, 1942, in Miles City, Montana, the son of Sylva Berthea (née Brurs) and Richard Sigwart Williams. In 1960, he graduated from Billings High School, in Billings, Montana. He is a graduate of the School of Journalism, class of 1964 at the University of Oregon in Eugene. He was a member of Alpha Delta Sigma (honorary professional fraternity) while at Oregon and served as national president.

Williams was one of the founders of the "Rock N Roll Marathons" that have raised in excess of $320 million for charities throughout the world.

== Career ==
Williams is the author of 11 books, most on stocks and commodity trading. Other books include The Mount Sinai Myth, based on an archeological search for Mount Sinai in Egypt. This book was featured in Vanity Fair in a rewrite by Howard Blum.

Confessions of a Radical Tax Protestor discusses his battle with the Internal Revenue Service, which led to a trial on three charges of tax evasion. On February 5, 2010, those charges were dropped and he pleaded guilty to three misdemeanor charges of failing to file income tax returns on time (for tax years 1999, 2000, and 2001).

Williams has created numerous market indicators, including Williams %R, Ultimate Oscillator, COT indices, accumulation/distribution indicators, cycle forecasts, market sentiment, and value measurements for commodity prices. Williams won the 1987 World Cup Championship of Futures Trading from the Robbins Trading Company, turning $10,000 into $1,137,600 (11,376%) in a 12-month competition. Ten years later, his daughter, actress Michelle, won the same contest. His son, Jason, a psychiatrist, has written a book on the personality of winning traders, The Mental Edge in Trading.

In November 2014, at the Traders Expo in Las Vegas, Larry Williams recorded a series of four videos discussing his 50+ years of trading. In 2018, he appeared as a guest on the NPR economics podcast Planet Money to discuss the story of his tax protest, extradition, and trial.

Williams funds a six-figure scholarship at the University of Oregon in honor of his college professor, Max Wales, restricted to "journalism and communication students who... have demonstrated creative talent, but may not have a high grade point average."

== Politics ==
Williams was twice the Republican Party nominee to the United States Senate in Montana. In 1978, he defeated Bill Osborne and Clancy Rich in the Republican primary with 35,479 votes (62%), and then lost to Democratic U.S. Representative Max Baucus in the general election by 160,353 votes (56%) to 127,589 (44%). In 1982, he defeated attorney Willie Dee Morris in the primary by 49,615 votes (88%) to 6,696 (12%), and was then defeated in the general election by incumbent Democratic U.S. Senator John Melcher by 174,861 votes (54%) to 133,789 (42%).

He sponsored Initiative 86, which made Montana the first state to index tax brackets for inflation.

== Books ==
- How I Made One Million Dollars… Last Year… Trading Commodities. Windsor Books. 1979. ISBN 978-0930233105.
- The Secret of Selecting Stocks for Immediate and Substantial Gains. Windsor Books. 1986. ISBN 978-0930233051.
- The Definitive Guide to Futures Trading, Volume I. Windsor Books. 1988. ISBN 978-0930233365.
- The Definitive Guide to Futures Trading, Volume II. Windsor Books. 1988. ISBN 978-0930233211.
- The Mount Sinai Myth. Carol Publishing Corporation. 1990. ISBN 978-1559720007.
- Long-Term Secrets to Short-Term Trading. Wiley. 1998. ISBN 978-0471297222.

Party political offices
| Preceded by Hank Hibbard | Republican nominee for U.S. Senator from Montana (Class 2); 1978 | Succeeded by Chuck Cozzens |
| Preceded by Stanley Burger | Republican nominee for U.S. Senator from Montana (Class 1); 1982 | Succeeded by Conrad Burns |
