= Pivotal =

Pivotal may refer to:

- Something that is important
- Pivotal CRM, a customer relationship management software system offered by Aptean
- Pivotal Labs, a former software company, division of Pivotal Software
  - Pivotal Tracker, a project management product offered by Pivotal Labs
- Pivotal Software, a software company, a spin off from VMware and EMC Corporation
- Pivotal (horse), British thoroughbred racehorse
- Pivotal BlackFly flying car

== See also ==
- Pivot (disambiguation)
