= Volume–price trend =

Technical analysis indicator

Volume–price trend (VPT) (sometimes price–volume trend) is a technical analysis indicator intended to relate price and volume in the stock market. VPT is based on a running cumulative volume that adds or subtracts a multiple of the percentage change in share price trend and current volume, depending upon the investment's upward or downward movements.

== Formula ==
$$\text{VPT} = \text{VPT}_\text{prev} + \text{volume} \times { \text{close}_\text{today} - \text{close}_\text{prev} \over \text{close}_\text{prev} }$$

VPT total, i.e. the zero point, is arbitrary. Only the shape of the resulting indicator is used, not the actual level of the total.

VPT is similar to on-balance volume (OBV), but where OBV takes volume just according to whether the close was higher or lower, VPT includes how much higher or lower it was.

VPT is interpreted in similar ways to OBV. Generally, the idea is that volume is higher on days with a price move in the dominant direction, for example in a strong uptrend more volume on up days than down days. So, when prices are going up, VPT should be going up too, and when prices make a new rally high, VPT should too. If VPT fails to go past its previous rally high then this is a negative divergence, suggesting a weak move.

== Similar indicators ==
Other price × volume indicators:

- Money Flow Index
- On-balance volume
- Accumulation/distribution index
