= George Lane-Fox =

George Lane-Fox may refer to:

- George Lane-Fox (MP) (1793–1848), English landowner and Tory MP
- George Lane-Fox (1816–1896), English landowner, High Sheriff of Leitrim and High Sheriff of Yorkshire, son of the above
- George Lane-Fox, 1st Baron Bingley (1870–1947), English Conservative politician, grandson of the above

== See also ==
- George Lane (disambiguation)
- George Fox (disambiguation)
