= Linda Bradford Raschke =

American financier (born 1959)

- Born: Linda Sue Bradford; 1959 (age 66–67); Pasadena, California, United States
- Education: Occidental College
- Occupations: Commodities and Futures Trader
- Spouse: Damon Pavlatos
- Children: Erika Raschke
- Website: http://lindaraschke.net/

Linda Bradford Raschke (/'ræʃki/) is an American financier, commodities and futures trader, hedge fund manager, and author specializing in commodities, futures, and technical analysis. She is known for her inclusion in The New Market Wizards (1992) by Jack D. Schwager, which profiles prominent traders and market participants.

== Early life and education ==
Raschke was born in 1959 in Pasadena, California, Raschke earned dual bachelor’s degrees in economics and music composition from Occidental College in 1980.

== Career ==
Raschke entered professional trading in 1981 as a market maker in equity options. She held memberships on the Pacific Coast Stock Exchange and subsequently the Philadelphia Stock Exchange, where she honed skills in arbitrage, volatility analysis, and risk management.

In 1992, Raschke registered as a Commodity Trading Advisor with the National Futures Association and founded LBRGroup, Inc., firm specializing in futures and derivatives trading. She later served as a principal trader for hedge funds operated by 6800 Capital LLC.

In 1998, she launched the Watermark Fund (domiciled in the Caymans) with Laura Bondurant.

In 2002, she established LBR Asset Management and registered as a Commodity Pool Operator. She launched the Granat Fund, which traded global futures markets with a focus on risk-adjusted returns and drawdown management. The fund achieved notable recognition, ranking 17th out of approximately 4,500 hedge funds for five-year performance by BarclayHedge in the late 2000s.

From 2009 to December 2014, she was a partner in FuturePath Trading, LLC, a futures technology, a firm providing technology services.

She retired from institutional roles as a CTA and CPO in 2015 and has since maintained a private trading operation for her own account.

== Publications ==
In 1996, Raschke co-authored Street Smarts: High Probability Short-Term Trading Strategies with Laurence A. Connors, a widely referenced work on short-term technical setups.

In 2018, she published Trading Sardines: Lessons in the Markets from a Lifelong Trader, a memoir blending personal anecdotes with market insights drawn from her career.

She has spoken at the International Federation of Technical Analysts (IFTA), the Managed Futures Association (MFA), Bloomberg, Reuters, Dow Jones/Telerate, the American Association of Professional Technical Analysts (AAPTA), and the Market Technicians Association (now CMT Association).

== Recognition ==
Raschke was featured in The New Market Wizards (1992) by Jack D. Schwager. In 2024, she received the Lifetime Achievement Award from the International Federation of Technical Analysts for contributions to technical analysis and trader education.

She has also served in leadership roles, including on the board of the Market Technicians Association and as a two-term president of the American Association of Professional Technical Analysts.

=== In popular literature ===
- The New Market Wizards (1992) by Jack D. Schwager
- Women of the Street: Making It on Wall Street (1998) by Sue Herera
- The Heretics of Finance (2009) by Andrew Lo and Jasmina Hasanhodzic
- Traders at Work (2013) by Tim Bourquin
- Enhancing Trader Performance (2006) by Brett Steenbarger

== Personal life ==
Raschke is married to Damon Pavlatos and has one daughter. She supports the arts, including as an executive producer for the 2025 romantic comedy film For Worse (starring Amy Landecker) and contributions to Broadway productions such as A Christmas Carol.
