= Joseph Granville =

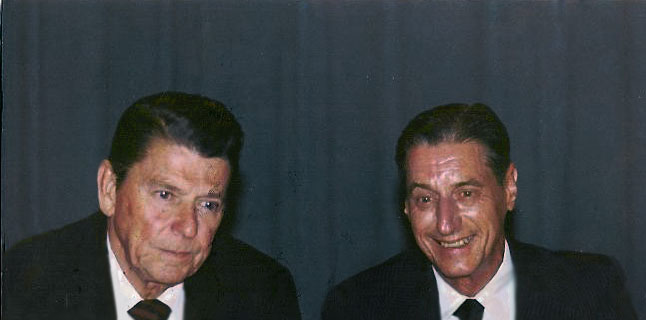
- Joseph Granville (right side) with Ronald Reagan
- Born: August 20, 1923; United States
- Died: September 7, 2013 (aged 90); Kansas City, Missouri
- Occupations: Writer, analyst
- Known for: Financial market prediction

Joseph Ensign Granville (August 20, 1923 – September 7, 2013), often called Joe Granville, was a financial writer and investment seminar speaker. He is most famous for inventing and developing the concept of "On-balance volume (OBV)". Granville argued that when volume increases sharply without a significant change in a stock's price, the price will eventually increase rapidly, and vice versa. On balance volume is thus one tool of technical analysis that attempts to predict future prices of stocks, commodities, and other financial assets traded on financial markets for which historical price and volume information is available.

Granville published a popular financial newsletter called The Granville Market Letter from 1963 until shortly before his death in 2013, appeared frequently on television programs such as CNBC, and gave seminars nationwide. By 1982, his $250 newsletter had more than 20,000 subscribers, and his total revenues were over $6m per year.

Granville is probably best known for his bearish market calls during the 1970s, 1980s, and 1990s, when he claimed that the stock market was headed for imminent collapse. Granville was known as a great showman who would emerge from a coffin at an investment conference, or appear to walk across water (at a swimming pool) when meeting clients. According to Robert Shiller, Granville's market calls were said by major media sources to have caused large moves in the Dow Jones Industrial Average on April 22, 1980 (+4.05%) and on January 6, 1981 (a reported $25 billion loss).

He died at the age of 90 in 2013 at a Kansas City, Missouri hospice, of pneumonia.
