= George Fox (cricketer) =

New Zealand cricketer

Personal information
- Full name: George Henry Fox
- Born: 20 February 1867; Tredington, Gloucestershire, England
- Died: 29 October 1920 (aged 53); Millbank, London, England

Domestic team information
- Years: Team
- 1888/89–1889/90: Otago
- Source: ESPNcricinfo, 9 May 2016

George Henry Fox (20 February 1867 – 29 October 1920), later known as George Henry Lane-Fox, was an English cricketer. He played two first-class matches in New Zealand for Otago, one in each of the 1888–89 and 1889–90 seasons.

Fox was born in England at Tredington, Gloucestershire in 1867. He was a medical doctor and, later in life, changed his surname to Lane-Fox.
