= George Lane (cricketer) =

English cricketer

George Lane (25 July 1852 – 31 July 1917) was an English first-class cricketer active 1880–1900 who played for Nottinghamshire and various teams in the USA where he was a resident. He was born in Kimberley, Nottinghamshire; died in Haverford, Pennsylvania.
