= On-balance volume =

Technical analysis indicator

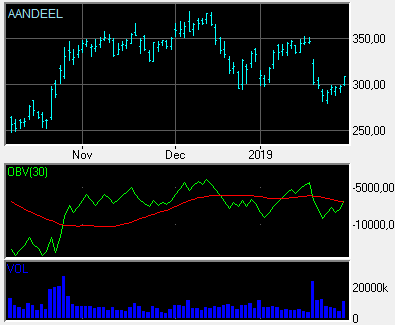
On Balance Volume (OBV) Indicator.

On-balance volume (OBV) is a technical analysis indicator intended to relate price and volume in the stock market. OBV is based on a cumulative total volume.

== The formula ==
$$OBV = OBV_{prev} + \left\{ \begin{matrix}
volume  & \mathrm{if}\ close > close_{prev} \\
0       & \mathrm{if}\ close = close_{prev} \\
-volume & \mathrm{if}\ close < close_{prev}
\end{matrix} \right.$$

Because OBV is a cumulative result, the value of OBV depends upon the starting point of the calculation.

== Application ==
Total volume for each day is assigned a positive or negative value depending on prices being higher or lower that day. A higher close results in the volume for that day to get a positive value, while a lower close results in negative value. So, when prices are going up, OBV should be going up too, and when prices make a new rally high, then OBV should too. If OBV fails to go past its previous rally high, then this is a negative divergence, suggesting a weak move.

The technique, originally called "continuous volume" by Woods and Vignola, was later named "on-balance volume" by Joseph Granville who popularized the technique in his 1963 book Granville's New Key to Stock Market Profits. The index can be applied to stocks individually based upon their daily up or down close, or to the market as a whole, using breadth of market data, i.e. the advance/decline ratio.

OBV is generally used to confirm price moves. The idea is that volume is higher on days where the price move is in the dominant direction, for example in a strong uptrend there is more volume on up days than down days.

== Similar indicators ==
Other price × volume indicators:

- Money flow
- Price and volume trend
- Accumulation/distribution index

== See also ==
- Dimensional analysis — explains why volume and price are multiplied (not divided) in such indicators
