= Mount Pivot =

Mountain in Antarctica

Mount Pivot (80°41′S 30°10′W) is a conspicuous mountain, 1,095 m, with steep rock slopes on its west side, standing between Mount Haslop and Turnpike Bluff in the west part of the Shackleton Range. It was first mapped in 1957 by the Commonwealth Trans-Antarctic Expedition and so named because this prominent landmark was the turning point for aircraft and sledging parties of the expedition rounding the southwest end of the Shackleton Range.
