= Modern Trader =

Business magazine

- Type: Monthly Business magazine (in USA, a registered newspaper)
- Format: Magazine
- Owner(s): The Alpha Pages
- Editor-in-chief: Jeff Joseph
- Editor: Daniel Collins
- Founded: September 1972
- Headquarters: Chicago
- Circulation: 50,000 subscribers per month (2015)
- ISSN: 2379-4674
- Website: www.topstep.com

Modern Trader is a United States-based monthly print investment magazine. The publication was established in 1972 under the name Commodities. The name was changed to Futures in September 1983 and Modern Trader in 2015.

The magazine is a standard source in futures and option trading, and its SourceBook site is a standard reference to US brokerage and related services.

The Commodity channel index was first published in Commodities, before it was renamed to Futures.

== History ==
The magazine was founded in 1972 as Commodities, published by Leon Rose and Mort Baratz. It was bought in 1976 by Daniel Oster for Merrill. It was bought again by Jeff Joseph's Alpha Pages from Summit Media in 2013.
