= Moving average crossover =

Occurrence in time-series statistics

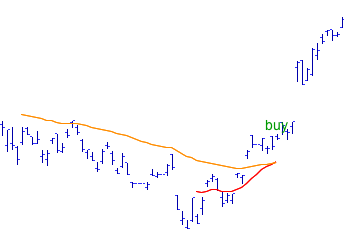
Moving average crossover of a 15-day exponential close-price MA (red) crossing over a 50-day exponential close-price MA (yellow)

In the statistics of time series, and in particular the stock market technical analysis, a moving-average crossover occurs when, on plotting two moving averages each based on different degrees of smoothing, the traces of these moving averages cross. It does not predict future direction but shows trends. This indicator uses two (or more) moving averages, a slower moving average and a faster moving average. The faster moving average is a short term moving average. For end-of-day stock markets, for example, it may be 5-, 10- or 25-day period while the slower moving average is medium or long term moving average (e.g. 50-, 100- or 200-day period). A short term moving average is faster because it only considers prices over short period of time and is thus more reactive to daily price changes. On the other hand, a long term moving average is deemed slower as it encapsulates prices over a longer period and is more lethargic. However, it tends to smooth out price noises which are often reflected in short term moving averages.

A moving average, as a line by itself, is often overlaid in price charts to indicate price trends. A crossover occurs when a faster moving average (i.e., a shorter period moving average) crosses a slower moving average (i.e. a longer period moving average). In other words, this is when the shorter period moving average line crosses a longer period moving average line. In stock investing, this meeting point is used either to enter (buy or sell) or exit (sell or buy) the market.

The particular case where simple equally weighted moving-averages are used is sometimes called a simple moving-average (SMA) crossover. Such a crossover can be used to signal a change in trend and can be used to trigger a trade in a black box trading system.

There are several types of moving average cross traders use in trading. Golden cross occurs when 50 days simple moving average crosses 200 days simple moving average from below. Death cross is an opposite situation, when 50 days simple moving average crosses 200 days simple moving average from above. Death cross is not a reliable indicator of future market declines.
