= CMT Association =

US non-profit professional association

- Chartered Market Technician Association
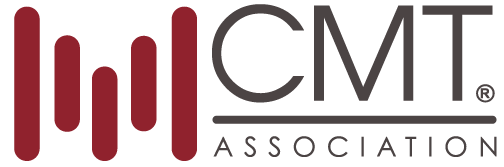
- Formation: 1967; 59 years ago
- Founders: Group of New York technical analysts
- Type: Professional association
- Legal status: Non-profit association
- Professional title: Chartered Market Technician (CMT)
- Location: New York City, United States
- Region served: Worldwide
- Services: Professional training
- Official language: English
- Website: cmtassociation.org

The CMT Association is a non-profit, global, professional association of technical analysts headquartered in New York City, servicing over 4,500 market analysis professionals in around 137 countries. The CMT Association is a global credentialing body with nearly 50 years of service to the financial industry. The CMT Association certifies that an individual is competent in the use of technical analysis via the Chartered Market Technician (CMT) designation.

== Chartered Market Technician ==
As with similar finance organizations that establish standards of competence for its members, the CMT Association provides a self-developed standard of proficiency. The Chartered Market Technician program is the examination series that demonstrates proficiency in technical analysis. Candidates who pass the program's three examination levels, and who are also full members of the CMT Association, earn the Chartered Market Technician designation (CMT), certifying that the individual is competent in the use of technical analysis. Candidates who pass the program's three examination levels and are full members of the CMT Association earn the Chartered Market Technician (CMT) designation, certifying their proficiency in technical analysis. This designation is recognized by FINRA.

== See also ==
- Market Rules to Remember, by Bob Farrell, first president of the CMT Association
- Technical analysis
- Certified Financial Technician
- List of international professional associations
