= Pivot point (technical analysis) =

Stock market price level

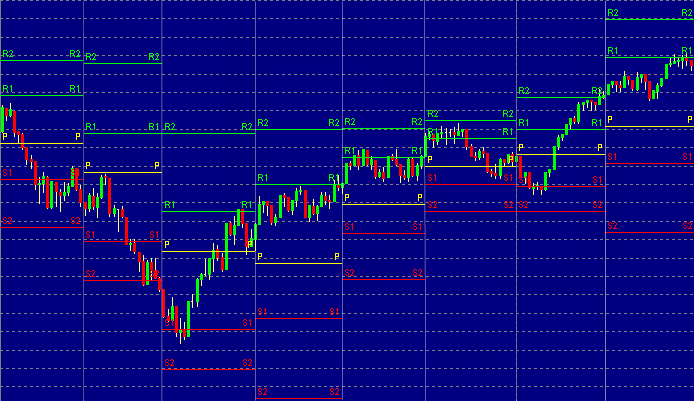
Monthly pivot point chart of the Dow Jones Industrial Average for the first 8 months of 2009, showing sets of first and second levels of resistance (green) and support (red). The pivot point levels are highlighted in yellow. Trading below the pivot point, particularly at the beginning of a trading period sets a bearish market sentiment and often results in further price decline, while trading above it, bullish price action may continue for some time.

In financial markets, a pivot point is a price level that is used by traders as a possible indicator of market movement. A pivot point is calculated as an average of significant prices (high, low, close) from the performance of a market in the prior trading period. If the market in the following period trades above the pivot point it is usually evaluated as a bullish sentiment, whereas trading below the pivot point is seen as bearish.

A pivot point and the associated support and resistance levels are often turning points for the direction of price movement in a market. In an up-trending market, the pivot point and the resistance levels may represent a ceiling level in price above which the uptrend is no longer sustainable and a reversal may occur. In a declining market, a pivot point and the support levels may represent a low price level of stability or a resistance to further decline.

== Calculation ==
Several methods exist for calculating the pivot point (P) of a market. Most commonly, it is the arithmetic average of the high (H), low (L), and closing (C) prices of the market in the prior trading period:

P = (H + L + C) / 3.

Sometimes, the average also includes the previous period's or the current period's opening price (O):

P = (O + H + L + C) / 4.

In other cases, traders like to emphasize the closing price, P = (H + L + C + C) / 4, or the current periods opening price, P = (H + L + O + O) / 4.

Some technical analysts use additional levels just above and below the pivot point (P) to define a range called "Central Pivot Range" or simply "CPR". Hence, instead of focusing on just one single level, they consider a range or a zone.

The lower boundary of this range is called BC (Bottom Central) and is calculated as :

BC = (H + L) / 2

The upper boundary of this range is called TC (Top Central) and is calculated as :

TC = (P - BC) + P

== Support and resistance levels ==
Price support and resistance levels are key trading tools in any market. Their roles may be interchangeable, depending on whether the price level is approached in an up-trending or a down-trending market. These price levels may be derived from many market assumptions and conventions. In pivot point analysis, several levels, usually three, are commonly recognized below and above the pivot point. These are calculated from the range of price movement in the previous trading period, added to the pivot point for resistance and subtracted from it for support levels.

The first and most significant level of support (S_{1}) and resistance (R_{1}) is obtained by recognition of the upper and the lower halves of the prior trading range, defined by the trading above the pivot point (H − P), and below it (P − L). The first resistance on the up-side of the market is given by the lower width of prior trading added to the pivot point price and the first support on the down-side is the width of the upper part of the prior trading range below the pivot point.

- R_{1} = P + (P − L) = 2×P − L
- S_{1} = P − (H − P) = 2×P − H

Thus, these levels may simply be calculated by subtracting the previous low (L) and high (H) price, respectively, from twice the pivot point value:

The second set of resistance (R_{2}) and support (S_{2}) levels are above and below, respectively, the first set. They are simply determined from the full width of the prior trading range (H − L), added to and subtracted from the pivot point, respectively:

- R_{2} = P + (H − L)
- S_{2} = P − (H − L)

Commonly a third set is also calculated, again representing another higher resistance level (R_{3}) and a yet lower support level (S_{3}). The method of the second set is continued by doubling the range added and subtracted from the pivot point:

- R_{3} = H + 2×(P − L) = R_{1} + (H − L)
- S_{3} = L − 2×(H − P) = S_{1} − (H − L)

This concept is sometimes, albeit rarely, extended to a fourth set in which the tripled value of the trading range is used in the calculation.

Qualitatively, the second and higher support and resistance levels are always located symmetrically around the pivot point, whereas this is not the case for the first levels, unless the pivot point happens to divide the prior trading range exactly in half.

== Trading tool ==
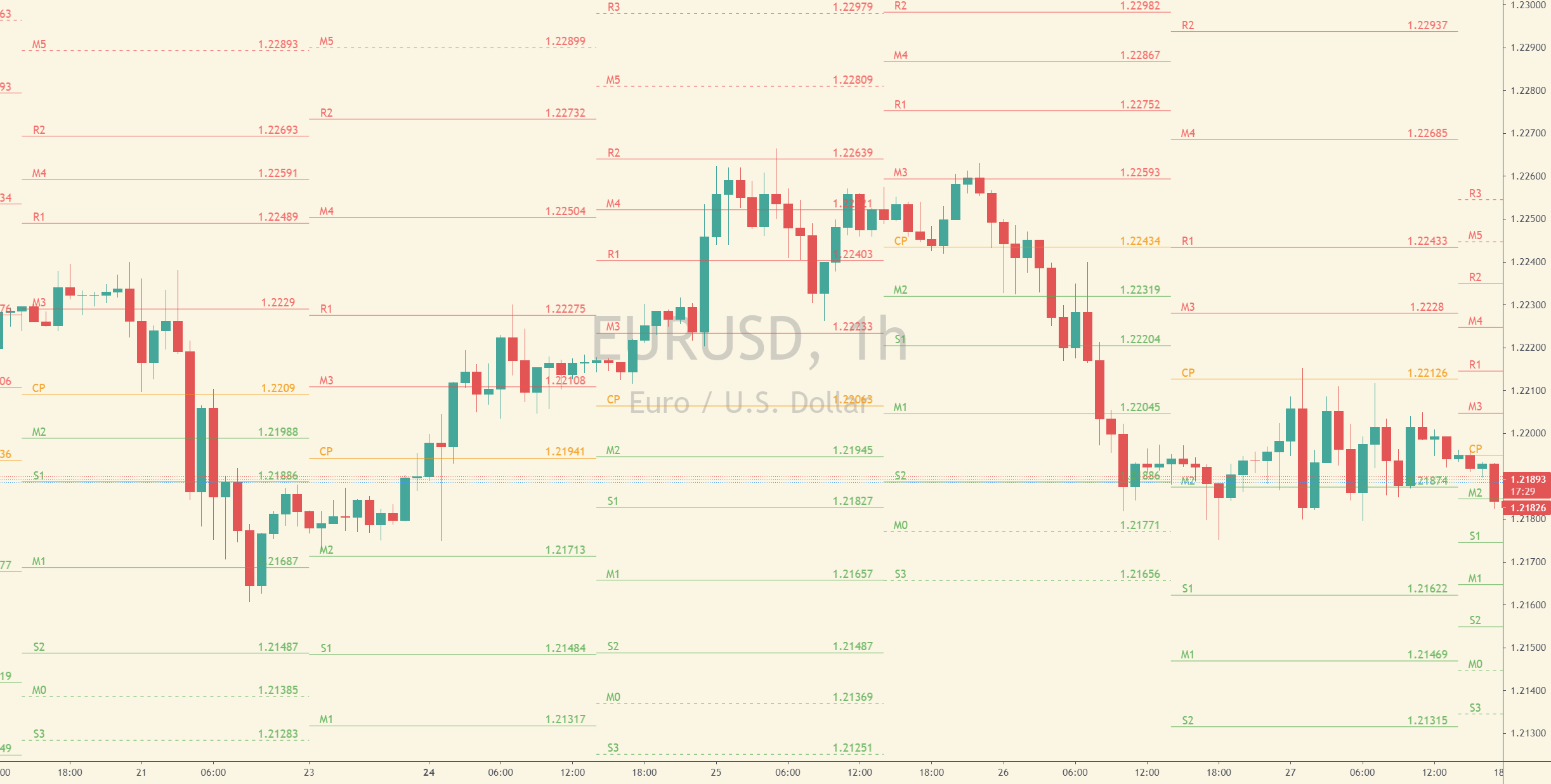
A picture of EURUSD from May 22nd to May 27th of 2021 with a pivot point indicator using middle pivots.

The pivot point itself represents a level of highest resistance or support, depending on the overall market condition. If the market is directionless (undecided), prices may fluctuate greatly around this level until a price breakout develops. Trading above or below the pivot point indicates the overall market sentiment. It is a leading indicator providing advanced signaling of potentially new market highs or lows within a given time frame.

The support and resistance levels calculated from the pivot point and the previous market width may be used as exit points of trades, but are rarely used as entry signals. For example, if the market is up-trending and breaks through the pivot point, the first resistance level is often a good target to close a position, as the probability of resistance and reversal increases greatly.

Many traders recognize the half-way levels between any of these levels as additional, but weaker resistance or support areas. The middle or mid-point pivots between the pivot points have no standard label format unlike the support and resistance labels. It's common that the label start with the letter (M), and then a symbol or number after it.

Using (+) and (-) symbols, the mid-point between the pivot point and R_{1} can be designated as M+, between R_{1} and R_{2} is M++. Below the pivot point the mid-points are labeled as M− and M−−. Using a number format starting from 0 to 5, the mid-points start as M0 between S_{3} and S_{2} up to M5 between R_{2} and R_{3}.

== See also ==
- Fundamental analysis
- Market analysis
- Market timing
- Technical indicator
- Technical analysis software
- Market sentiment
