= Oscillator (technical analysis) =

Technical analysis indicator for financial markets

An oscillator in technical analysis of financial markets is an indicator that informs if the price of a financial instrument is very high or very low, indicating whether it is overbought or oversold. This helps traders make decisions about when to trade (buy or sell) that instrument.

Oscillators vary over time within a band, moving above and below a center line or between set levels. They are used to identify short-term overbought or oversold conditions.

== Examples ==
Common oscillators include MACD, momentum, RSI, and CCI.
