= Technical indicator =

Mathematical calculation from market data to create a forecast

In technical analysis in finance, a technical indicator is a mathematical calculation based on historic price, volume, or (in the case of futures contracts) open interest information that aims to forecast financial market direction. Technical indicators are a fundamental part of technical analysis and are typically plotted as a chart pattern to try to predict the market trend. Indicators generally overlay on price chart data to indicate where the price is going, or whether the price is in an "overbought" condition or an "oversold" condition.

Many technical indicators have been developed and new variants continue to be developed by traders with the aim of getting better results. New Indicators are often backtested on historic price and volume data to see how effective they would have been to predict future events.

In the technical investigation, a bogus sign alludes to a sign of future value developments that gives an off base image of the financial reality. False signs may emerge because of various components, including timing slacks, inconsistencies in information sources, smoothing strategies or even the calculation by which the pointer is determined. Technical analysis tries to capture market psychology and sentiment by analyzing price trends and chart patterns for possible trading opportunities. Traders should be careful when taking trades solely based on indicators since they are not foolproof.

== Classification and types ==
Technical indicators are commonly classified by both their function and their display method on a chart.

According to financial analysis literature, indicators fall into several functional categories. Trend indicators include simple moving averages, exponential moving averages, and the Moving Average Convergence Divergence or MACD. These identify the direction and persistence of price movements.

Momentum indicators include the Relative Strength Index and the Stochastic oscillator. These measure the rate of price change. They also identify overbought and oversold conditions.

Volume indicators include On-balance volume and the Money Flow Index. These measure the buying and selling pressure reflected in trading volume.

Volatility indicators include Bollinger Bands and Average True Range. These assess the degree of price fluctuation.

Support and resistance indicators include Fibonacci Retracements. These project price levels where buyers or sellers may enter or exit the market.

Indicators are also distinguished by their display method and timing. Overlay indicators are plotted directly on a security's price chart, while oscillators are plotted in a separate window fluctuating between specified bounds. This distinction often correlates with their predictive nature: oscillators are frequently utilized as leading indicators to signal potential price reversals, whereas overlay tools generally function as lagging indicators to confirm established trends.
