= Zero lag exponential moving average =

The zero lag exponential moving average (ZLEMA) is a technical indicator within technical analysis that aims is to eliminate the inherent lag associated to all trend following indicators which average a price over time. As is the case with the double exponential moving average (DEMA) and the triple exponential moving average (TEMA) this indicator aims to reduce the lag.

== History ==
The indicator was created by John Ehlers and Ric Way around 2010.

== Formula ==
The formula for a given N-Day period and for a given data series is:

$$\begin{align}
\textit{Lag} &= \frac{Period - 1}{2} \\
\textit{EmaData} &= \textit{Data}+(\textit{Data} - \textit{Data}(\text{Lag days ago})) \\
\textit{ZLEMA} &= \textit{EMA}(\textit{EmaData}, \textit{Period})
\end{align}$$

The idea is do a regular exponential moving average (EMA) calculation but on a de-lagged data instead of doing it on the regular data. Data is de-lagged by removing the data from "lag" days ago thus removing (or attempting to) the cumulative effect of the moving average.
