= Drummond geometry =

Trading method consisting of a series of technical analysis tools

Drummond Geometry is a trading method consisting of a series of technical analysis tools invented by the Canadian trader Charles Drummond starting in the 1970s and continuing to the present (2021). The method establishes support and resistance areas in multiple time periods and uses these to determine high probability trading areas.

Drummond Geometry consists of the following:

- Short term trend lines based on two bars in various configurations.
- Short term 3-period displaced moving averages.
- An envelope consisting of two trading bands.
- Co-ordination of these elements in three or more time frames.

Typical time-frames vary according to the trader's goal:

Daily, weekly, monthly for swing traders. Daily, monthly, quarterly and yearly for long-term position traders. 15-minute, hourly, and daily for intraday traders Some short-term traders also use 1 to 5 minute charts, tick charts, renko charts, and other rapidly changing market charting tools.

The usual moving average length for the envelopes and midline is 3-periods.

The method also relies on a moving average based on the "PL Dot". The formula for the PL Dot is the average of the high, low, and close of the last three bars, displaced forward one bar: $[Avg(H(1),L(1),C(1)) + Avg(H(2),L(2),C(2)) + Avg(H(3),L(3),C(3))]/3$ Each completed bar generates a new PL dot and this series of dots form a moving average, which is plotted either as a continuous line or as an individual dot on each bar. Both the dot itself and the moving average formed by the dots are by convention called the "PL Dot."

== Indicators derived from Drummond Geometry ==
Indicators developed for the efficient application of P&L charting or Drummond geometry include the assemblage of several P&L lines and levels into groups that represent future support and resistance "zones," which are further classified into "nearby" and "further-out" support and resistance areas.

Other indicators include multiple time period overlays of support and resistance from one time period onto a lower time period, for example from a daily time period onto an hourly or a tick chart, or of monthly and weekly overlays onto a daily chart.

== Recent enhancements ==
Recent enhancements include the "EOTEM" or "Pipes" indicators which combine momentum indicators, and predicted resistance and support areas. The "Pipes" indicator includes elements from traditional Drummond Geometry as well (the trading bands and the "PL dot" moving average).

== Effectiveness ==
Statistical studies show positive effectiveness of the predicted support and resistance levels established by Drummond Geometry. Individual traders have reported both better and worse results as the trading approach requires traders to recognize signals and take action on them, and that skill varies by individuals. A raw statistical analysis of the tools has been published; see this research report chart created by a Drummond analyst: Efficiency of Drummond P&L Lines Holding or Breaking This statistical analysis can be misleading, if not carefully interpreted, caveat emptor. If, for example, a line is not approached closely, it should not be included in the statistical category called hold. A category showing statistics for closes far away from a line could be misleading if price was never near the line in the beginning.

== Statistical properties ==
The short-term moving average known as the PL dot has a sensitive response to changes in trend conditions due to the short (three-period) averaging scale and the nature of the components which include in the average the highs and lows as well as the close, thus taking into consideration the volatility as well as the resting place of the period being measured. The "Drummond Lines" or short-term two-bar trend lines can be shown to project support and resistance effectively, which the methodology then takes as a starting point and works to improve these odds by specifying which tools should be used under which circumstances.
