= Kumo =

Kumo may refer to:

- Kokemäki, Kumo in Swedish, a municipality of Finland
- Kumo (album), album by D'espairsRay, or the title song, 2000
- "Kumo", song from the album 020120 by The Mad Capsule Markets, 2002
- "Kumo", song from the album Hōyoku by Mucc, 2005
- "Kumo", song by Tokio, 2017
- Kumo (musician) (born 1965), British musician and composer
- Kumo (sculpture), a public art work by Isaac Witkin in Milwaukee, Wisconsin, US
- Kumo (search engine), a previous Microsoft search engine (now Bing)
- Kumo Xi, ancient Manchurian people
- KUMO-LD, Retro Television Network affiliate
- Japanese term for Cloud ("雲"), also used in English as part of the Ichimoku Kinkō Hyō analysis method
- Kumo, abbreviation and nickname of Kumoricon, an anime convention from Portland, Oregon, named after the word Cloudy (曇り)
- Kumo, Nigeria, a city in Akko local government area in Gombe state, Nigeria
- Colloquial name for the Kumamoto oyster
