= Renko =

Renko may refer to:

- Renko chart, a type of financial chart
- Renko, Finland, a former municipality in Southern Finland
- Renko (surname)
- Renko, debut album of Dutch rock band Daryll-Ann
- Renko Usami, a fictional character from the video game franchise, Touhou Project
