= Advisors Sentiment =

Advisors Sentiment survey is a field of market sentiment. Advisors Sentiment was devised by Abe Cohen of Chartcraft in 1963 and is still operated by Chartcraft, now under their brand name of Investors Intelligence. The survey surveys independent investment newsletters (those not affiliated with brokerage houses or mutual funds). Findings are reported weekly as the percentage of advisors that are bullish, bearish and those that expect a correction. The survey is anecdotal evidence as to extremes in investor confidence, conditions that are often seen at major market turning points.

The survey is often quoted in the media. In August 2009, articles in the Los Angeles Times and The Wall Street Journal reported that advisors were as bearish as they were in October 2007, a warning sign that markets were getting ahead of themselves.

== Bull–Bear Spread ==
The Investors Intelligence Sentiment Survey reports the attitudes of U.S. advisors. A large difference between the percentage bullish vs. bearish indicates more risk.

- The 30% difference is increased risk.
- At 40% difference consider defensive measures.

On January 16, 2018, Peter Boockvar said that the Investors Intelligence had the highest bull bear spread since 1986. Boockvar said that there was an extraordinary level of overboughtness.

Yardeni Research, Inc. posts data about the Investors Intelligence Sentiment Survey including the Percentage Bulls & Bears.

== See also ==
- Point and figure chart
- Market timing
