= Advance–decline line =

Stock market technical indicator

The advance–decline line is a stock market technical indicator used by investors to measure the number of individual stocks participating in a market rise or fall. As price changes of large stocks can have a disproportionate effect on capitalization weighted stock market indices such as the S&P 500, the NYSE Composite Index, and the NASDAQ Composite index, it can be useful to know how broadly this movement extends into the larger universe of smaller stocks. Since market indexes represent a group of stocks, they do not present the whole picture of the trading day and the performance of the market during this day. Though the market indices give an idea about what has happened during the trading day, advance/decline numbers give an idea about the individual performance of particular stocks.

== Formulae ==
The advance–decline line is a plot of the cumulative sum of the daily difference between the number of issues advancing, i.e., above the previous day's closing price, and the number of issues declining in a particular stock market index. Thus it moves up when the index contains more advancing than declining issues, and moves down when there are more declining than advancing issues. The formula for ADL is:

$$AD line = today's\ advancing\ stocks - today's\ declining\ stocks + yesterday's\ AD\ line\ value$$

The Advance/Decline Line formula could be applied to volume of the advancing and declining stocks.

$AD\ volume\ line = Advanced\ Volume - Declined\ Volume + yesterday's\ AD\ volume\ line$

The ADL is one of the oldest indicators based on the Advance-Decline Data and it was the most popular of all internal indicators.

== Divergence ==
"Divergence" is when the stock market index moves in one direction while the ADL on that index moves in the opposite direction. If the index moves up while the ADL moves down, the index may be misleading about the true direction of the overall market, as happened toward the end of the US Dot-com bubble in 1999–2000, when the indices continued to rally while the ADL diverged downward starting at the beginning of 1999. Such negative divergence was also seen toward the end of the Roaring Twenties bull market, during 1972 at the height of the Nifty Fifty market, and starting in March 2008 during the 2008 financial crisis.

== Advance–decline numbers application ==
There may be cases in which an index reports a gain at the end of the trading day. This gain may be caused by an increase in a certain number of stocks. However, a significant lead by declining stocks may be observed relative to the advancing stocks.

However, these results should be interpreted as a decline in the market, no matter that the index has experienced an increase. Therefore, you should base your judgments regarding the performance of the market on the advance/decline numbers, not on the performance of a particular index no matter how broad it is.

There have been many cases in which a major increase in an index was not accompanied by an increase in the advance number. In such a case it is reasonable to conclude that by the end of the trading day the index will decline.

The reverse is also true. For instance, if there is a significant movement in the advance/decline numbers, you can expect a movement in the different indexes as well.

Additionally, a market that experiences a trend toward either a decline or an advance is highly unlikely to reverse its movement immediately on the next trading day.

Advance–decline numbers can be also used in your daily observations of the trades to determine whether a particular trend is a false or a spot.
