= Charles Drummond =

Canadian financial trader and author

- Born: 1936 (age 89–90)
- Occupations: Securities trader, market technician, author, educator, speaker and technical analyst

Charles Drummond (born 1936), is a Canadian securities trader, market technician, author, educator, speaker and technical analyst. Drummond developed and popularized the "Point and Line" method of technical analysis, also known as "P&L Charting" and Drummond Geometry. His methods are in use today among technical analysts and traders. In recent years his work has also been noted by Forex Traders. Drummond is the author of nine books and a website.

== Career ==
Raised in Toronto, Drummondtraded in the Toronto futures exchanges in the 1970s and 1980s as he developed his theories. In the late 1980s he relocated to Nova Scotia where he maintained an organic farm and wrote many of his works on technical analysis.

== Published works ==
- "Energy Patterns" By Charles Drummond 2015, Stocks & Commodities Magazine Featured Article. 5 pages.
- How to Make Money in the Futures Market…and lots of it! By Charles Drummond. 1978, 575 Pages. Hearne Associates/Drummond Publications (Chicago).
- Charles Drummond on Advanced P&L, by Charles Drummond. 1980, 547 pages. Hearne Associates/Drummond Publications (Chicago).
- The P&L Labs, by Charles Drummond. 1981, 260 pages. Hearne Associates/Drummond Publications (Chicago).
- The 1-1 Paper, by Charles Drummond. 1985, 277 pages. Hearne Associates/Drummond Publications (Chicago).
- The Energy Paper, by Charles Drummond. 1991, 18 pages, Hearne Associates/Drummond Publications (Chicago).
- P&L Accumulation/Distribution: Knowing When to Trade, by Charles Drummond. 1993, 185 pages. Hearne Associates/Drummond Publications (Chicago).
- Knowing Where the Energy is Coming From, by Charles Drummond. 1995, 190 pages. Hearne Associates/Drummond Publications (Chicago).
- Pattern Picking, by Charles Drummond. 1996, 22 pages. Drummond Publications.
- Predicting Next Week's Range (& understanding how the daily plays it out), by Charles Drummond. 1996, 62 pages.
- Psycho Paper '96: P&L's Connection with Awareness, by Charles Drummond. 1996, 160 pages. Hearne Associates/Drummond Publications (Chicago).
- The Lessons, by Charles Drummond and Ted Hearne, 1997–2001.
