= Bear flag (disambiguation) =

The Bear Flag is a nickname for the state flag of California.

Bear Flag or The Bear Flag may also refer to:

== California-related uses ==
- Bear Flag Elementary School in the Pocket-Greenhaven suburb of Sacramento, California
- Bear Flag Empire, a fictitious land in a role-playing game
- Bear Flag Republic or California Republic, an 1846 unrecognized breakaway state from Mexico
  - Bear Flag (1846)

== Other uses ==
- Bear flag (gay culture), a flag representing the bear subculture within the gay community
- Bear flag (investing), a bearish flag pattern in the price charts of financially traded assets

== See also ==
- Bear Flag Monument dedicated to the Bear Flag revolt
- Flag of Alaska with Ursa Major (great bear)
- Flag of Berlin
- Coat of arms of Madrid
