= Moving average (disambiguation) =

A moving average is a calculation to analyze data points by creating a series of averages of different subsets of the full data set.

Moving average may also refer to:

- Moving-average model, an approach for modeling univariate time series models
- Moving average filter, a finite impulse response filter in digital signal processing
- Convolution, a moving average in other mathematical contexts

== See also ==
- Trix (technical analysis), a triple moving average
