= TRIN =

Trin is a municipality in Grisons, Switzerland.

TRIN may also refer to:

- TRIN (finance), a stock market indicator
- Carl Bernhard von Trinius (1778–1844), German-born botanist and physician
- Trin railway station, Grisons, Switzerland

== See also ==
- Dominick Trinchera (1936–1981), American caporegime in the Bonanno crime family nicknamed "Big Trin"
- Trinity (disambiguation)
