= Point and figure chart =

Charting technique used in technical analysis

Point and figure (P&F) is a charting technique used in technical analysis. Point and figure charting does not plot price against time as time-based charts do. Instead it plots price against changes in direction by plotting a column of Xs as the price rises and a column of Os as the price falls.

== History ==
The technique is over 100 years old. "Hoyle" was the first to write about it and showed charts in his 1898 book, The Game in Wall Street. The first book/manual dedicated to Point and Figure was written by Victor Devilliers in 1933. Chartcraft Inc, in the US, popularized the system in the 1940s. Cohen founded Chartcraft and wrote on point and figure charting in 1947. Chartcraft published further pioneering books on P&F charting, namely those by Burke, Aby and Zieg. Chartcraft Inc is still running today, providing daily point and figure services for the US market under the name of Investors Intelligence. Veteran Mike Burke still works for Chartcraft, having started back in 1962 under the guidance of Cohen. Burke went on to train other point and figure gurus, such as Thomas Dorsey who would go on to write authoritative texts on the subject.

A detailed history can be found in Jeremy du Plessis’ ‘The Definitive Guide to Point and Figure’ where many references and examples are cited.

Du Plessis describes the historical development of these charts from a price recording system to a charting method. Traders kept track of prices by writing them down in columns. They noticed patterns in their price record and started referring to them first as ‘fluctuation charts’ and then as ‘figure charts’. They started using Xs instead of numbers and these charts became known as ‘point charts’. Traders used both point charts and figure charts together and referred to them as their point and figure charts, which is where Du Plessis suggests the name point and figure came from. Modern point and figure charts are drawn with Xs and Os where columns of Xs are rising prices and columns of Os are falling prices, although many traditionalists such as David Fuller and Louise Yamada still use the Xs only point method of plotting.

== Advantages of point and figure ==
Point and Figure charts are based primarily on price action, not time. If there are no significant price moves over time, P&F charts will show no new data. This difference can make P&F charts ideal for detecting directional patterns and trends in a condensed format.

== How to draw ==
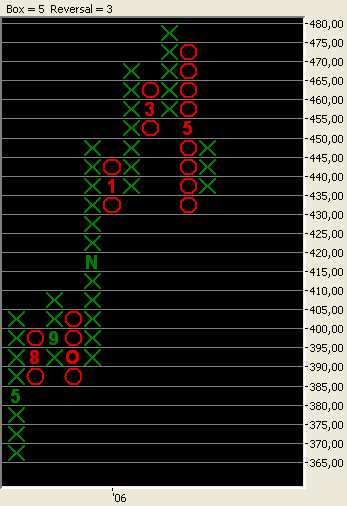
Sample point and figure chart with box size set to $5 and reversal threshold set to 3 box sizes.

The correct way to draw a point and figure chart is to plot every price change but practicality has rendered this difficult to do for a large quantity of stocks so many point and figure chartists use the summary prices at the end of each day. Some prefer to use the day's closing price and some prefer to use the day's high or low depending on the direction of the last column. The high/low method was invented by A.W. Cohen in his 1947 book, 'How to Use the Three-Point Reversal Method of Point & Figure Stock Market Timing' and has a large following.

The charts are constructed by deciding on the value represented by each X and O. Any price change below this value is ignored so point and figure acts as a sieve to filter out the smaller price changes. The charts change column when the price changes direction by the value of a certain number of Xs or Os. Traditionally this was one and is called a 1 box reversal chart. More common is three, called a 3 box reversal chart.

== 45 degree trend lines ==
Because point and figure charts are plotted on squared paper, 45 degree lines may be used to define up trends and down trends from important highs and lows on the chart allowing objective analysis of trends.

== Price targets ==
Also in common usage are two methods of obtaining price targets from point and figure charts. The vertical method measures the length of the thrust off a high or low and projects the thrust to obtain a target. The horizontal method measures the width of a congestion pattern and uses that to obtain a target.

== Computerization ==
In the US, Chartcraft used an IBM S/360 in the 1960s to produce point and figure charts.

Point and figure charts were automated in the UK in the early 1980s by the Indexia company run by Jeremy Du Plessis. This automation increased the popularity and usage of point and figure charts because hundreds of charts could be viewed and altered quickly and easily. At the same time a method of log scaling point and figure charts was devised, where the value of the Xs and Os was set to a percentage rather than a price. This allowed the sensitivity of Point and Figure charts to remain constant no matter what the price level.

Kaufman, in New Trading Systems and Methods, 2005, documents research he and Kermit Zeig performed over many years computerizing point and figure charting. LeBeau and Lucas also developed computerized point and figure charts in Technical Traders Guide to Computer Analysis of the Futures Markets.

== See also ==
- Kagi chart
- Line break chart
- Renko chart
