= Momentum (technical analysis) =

Simple technical analysis indicators

In financial technical analysis, momentum (MTM) and rate of change (ROC) are simple indicators showing the difference between today's closing price and the close N days ago. Momentum is the absolute difference in stock, commodity:

$$\text{Momentum} = \text{close}_\text{today} - \text{close}_{N\,\text{days ago}}$$

Rate of change scales by the old close, so as to represent the increase as a fraction,

$$\text{Rate of change} = {\text{close}_\text{today} - \text{close}_{N\,\text{days ago}} \over \text{close}_{N\,\text{days ago}} }$$

"Momentum" in general refers to prices continuing to trend. The momentum and ROC indicators show trend by remaining positive while an uptrend is sustained, or negative while a downtrend is sustained.

A crossing up through zero may be used as a signal to buy, or a crossing down through zero as a signal to sell. How high (or how low when negative) the indicators get shows how strong the trend is.

The way momentum shows an absolute change means it shows for instance a $3 rise over 20 days, whereas ROC might show that as 0.25 for a 25% rise over the same period. One can choose between looking at a move in dollar terms, relative point terms, or proportional terms. The zero crossings are the same in each, of course, but the highs or lows showing strength are on the respective different bases.

The conventional interpretation is to use momentum as a trend-following indicator. This means that when the indicator peaks and begins to descend, it can be considered a sell signal. The opposite conditions can be interpreted when the indicator bottoms out and begins to rise. Momentum signals (e.g., 52-week high) have been shown to be used by financial analysts in their buy and sell recommendations.

== SMA ==
Momentum is the change in an N-day simple moving average (SMA) between yesterday and today, with a scale factor N+1, i.e.

$${\text{Momentum} \over N+1} = \text{SMA}_\text{today} - \text{SMA}_\text{yesterday}$$

This is the slope or steepness of the SMA line, like a derivative. This relationship is not much discussed generally, but it's of interest in understanding the signals from the indicator.

When momentum crosses up through zero it corresponds to a trough in the SMA, and when it crosses down through zero it's a peak. How high (or low) momentum gets represents how steeply the SMA is rising (or falling).

The TRIX indicator is similarly based on changes in a moving average (a triple exponential in that case).

== Other moving average trading rules ==
The relationship between different moving average trading rules is explained in the paper "Anatomy of Market Timing with Moving Averages". Specifically, in this paper the author demonstrates that every trading rule can be presented as a weighted average of the momentum rules computed using different averaging periods.
