= Double exponential moving average =

Stock indicator introduced in 1994

The Double Exponential Moving Average (DEMA) indicator was introduced in January 1994 by Patrick G. Mulloy, in an article in the "Technical Analysis of Stocks & Commodities" magazine: "Smoothing Data with Faster Moving Averages"

It attempts to remove the inherent lag associated with Moving Averages by placing more weight on recent values. The name suggests this is achieved by applying a double exponential smoothing which is not the case. The name double comes from the fact that the value of an EMA (Exponential Moving Average) is doubled. To keep it in line with the actual data and to remove the lag the value "EMA of EMA" is subtracted from the previously doubled ema.

The formula is:

$$\textit{DEMA} = 2 \times \textit{EMA} - \textit{EMA}(\textit{EMA})$$

Because EMA(EMA) is used in the calculation, DEMA needs 2 × period - 1 samples to start producing values in contrast to the period samples needed by a regular EMA

The same article also introduced another EMA related indicator: Triple exponential moving average (TEMA)

As shown in the formula it reduces the weight on the recent values and by calculating ema of the ema we are trying to remove the weight on the long slower part of the average that has built up over time. It significantly helps make quicker decisions than the simple MA crossovers. Available on almost all the trading software now, it is much better than as it helps capture the trend earlier and make better decisions in the sense that helps one make better entry and exit points improving profitability.
