= Renko chart =

Type of financial chart of Japanese origin

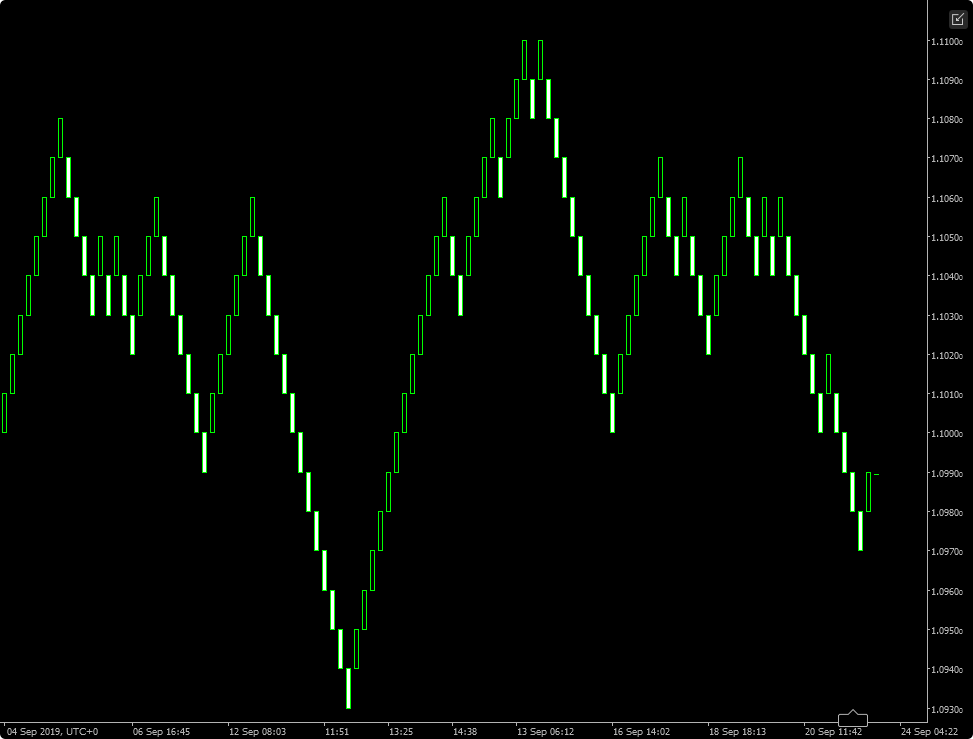
Renko chart example in Forex market for EUR/USD pair

A Renko chart (Japanese: 練行足, romanized: renkōashi, also written 練り足 neriashi) is a type of financial chart of Japanese origin used in technical analysis that measures and plots price changes. A renko chart consists of bricks (煉瓦, renga), which proponents say more clearly show market trends and increase the signal-to-noise ratio compared to typical candlestick charts.

== Construction ==
Renko charting is similar to point-and-figure in that time does not play a role in Renko charts. Renko blocks (or bricks) are plotted using the following rules:

- A brick size is determined, e.g. 10 points. All bricks are drawn to be of that size.
- Once the price surpasses the lower or upper border of the current brick by the brick size, a new brick is drawn either above or below the previous one, but never on the same line.
- The new brick is always drawn further to the right on the horizontal axis.
- If the price surpasses the previous brick by more than one chosen size, the respective number of bricks is plotted on the chart.
- Partial bricks are not plotted until complete brick size distance is covered by the price.
- Renko charts typically only use closing prices based on the chart time frame chosen. For example, if using a weekly time frame, then weekly closing prices will be used to construct the bricks.

Similarly to Kagi charts, Renko charts help chartists to cancel out the noise present on time-based charts, focus on important price levels, detect support and resistance, and identify market trends.
