= McClellan oscillator =

Financial analysis indicator

The McClellan oscillator is a market breadth indicator used in technical analysis by financial analysts of the New York Stock Exchange to evaluate the balance between the advancing and declining stocks. The McClellan oscillator is based on the Advance-Decline Data and it could be applied to stock market exchanges, indexes, portfolio of stocks or any basket of stocks.

== How it works ==
The simplified formula for determining the oscillator is:

$$Oscillator = (\text{19-day EMA of advances minus declines}) - (\text{39 day EMA of advances minus declines})$$

where advances is the number of the NYSE listed stocks which are traded above their previous day close and "declines" is the number of the NYSE listed stocks traded below their previous day close.

- Difference between advances and declines shows whether we have more advancing or more declining stocks on the NYSE. Dominance of the advancing stocks is considered as bullish Breadth sentiment and higher number of declining stocks is considered as bearish Breadth sentiment
- By applying 19-day and 39 day EMAs to the difference between advances and declines we define shorter-term (19-day) and longer-term (39-day) Breadth sentiment.
- By calculating McClellan Oscillator as the difference between 19-day EMA and 39-day EMA of advances minus declines, we apply MACD principle to Breadth sentiment - to see changes in shorter-term Breadth sentiment.

Therefore, crossovers of McClellan Oscillator and zero center line around which it oscillates would have the following meaning:

- When McClellan Oscillator crosses above zero line it tells us that "19-day EMA of advances minus declines" crossed above "39-day EMA of advances minus declines" which indicates that an increase in the number of advancing stocks on the NYSE Exchange is strong enough to consider it as a signal of possible up-move on the NYSE index.
- When McClellan Oscillator crosses below zero line it tells us that "19-day EMA of advances minus declines" crossed below "39-day EMA of advances minus declines" which indicates that an increase in the number of declining stocks on the NYSE Exchange is strong enough to consider it as a signal of a possible down-move on the NYSE index.

== McClellan Summation Index ==
The McClellan Summation Index (MSI) is calculated by adding each day's McClellan oscillator to the previous day's summation index.

MSI properties:

- When above zero it is considered to be bullish (positive growth).
- When below zero it is considered to be bearish (negative growth).

The Summation index is oversold at −1000 to −1250 or overbought at 1000 to 1250.
