= William Peter Hamilton =

Fourth editor of The Wall Street Journal, stock-market analyst

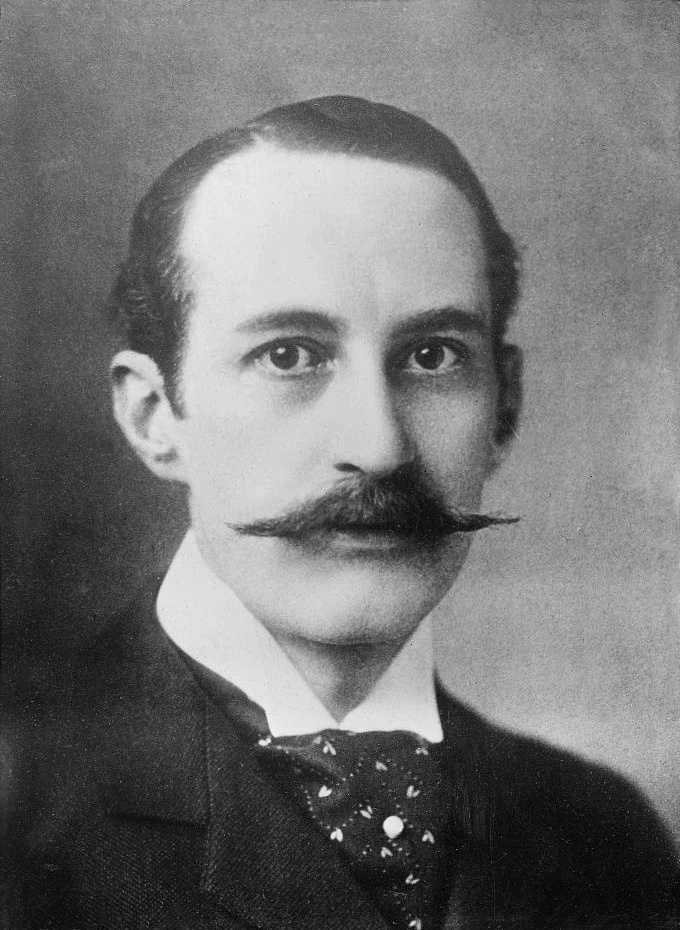
- William Peter Hamilton c. 1910-1913
- Born: January 20, 1867; Manchester, England
- Died: December 9, 1929 (aged 62); New York City, U.S.
- Occupations: Author, Journalist, Editor, Technical Analyst
- Years active: 1890–1929
- Spouse(s): Georgianna Tooker (1850-1916) (m. 1901; died 1916); Lillian Hart (1861-1955) (m. 1917)

William Peter Hamilton (January 20, 1867 – December 9, 1929), a proponent of Dow Theory, was the fourth editor of the Wall Street Journal, serving in that capacity for more than 20 years (i.e., January 1, 1908 – December 9, 1929).

"Some people think and others do. Dow thought and created an index and pondered it. Hamilton [by contrast,] put it to practice as a workhorse. He was the first serious practitioner of [both] the art of forecasting future stock action based on precise prior action [and the] forecasting of the economy based on the market."

== Family ==
Of Scottish heritage, and the son of Thomas Hamilton (born 1835), and Jane Elizabeth (née Earnshaw) Hamilton (born 1845), William Peter Hamilton was born in Manchester, England on January 20, 1867.

He married Georgiana Tooker in 1901. He married his second wife, Lillian Hart, in New York, on 19 May 1917.

== Journalist ==
Having earlier worked as a clerk on the London Stock Exchange, he began his career in journalism in London, in 1890, with The Pall Mall Gazette, under the editorship of William Thomas Stead (1849-1912).

In 1893 and 1894, he served in Africa as a Lieutenant in the Royal Engineers of the British Auxiliary Forces during the First Matabele War, and also as a corporal in the British Bechuanaland Police. He also served as a war correspondent for the Gazette during that time; and, once the war was over, he remained in Johannesburg, working as a financial journalist.

== The Wall Street Journal ==
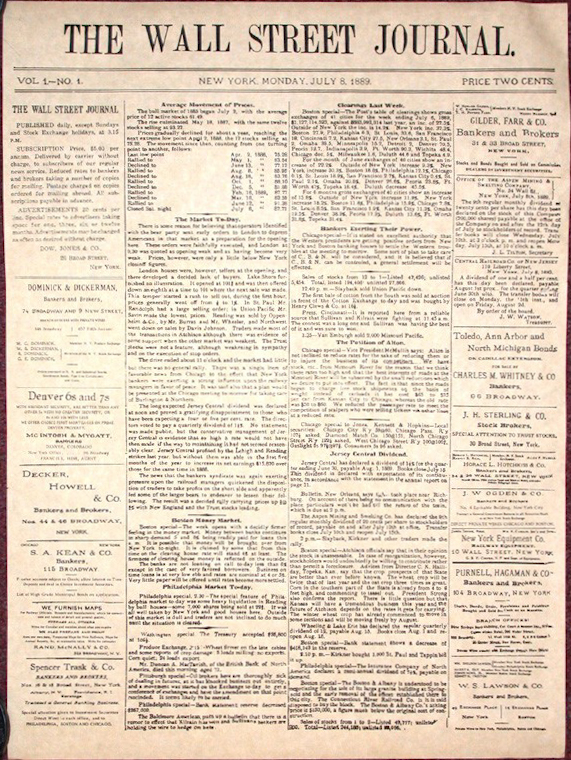
The Wall Street Journal, first issue (July 8, 1889)

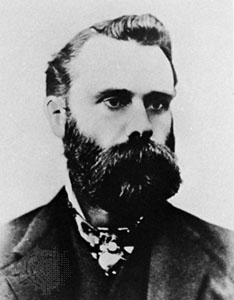
Charles Henry Dow (1851–1902)

Having moved from South Africa to Australia, "where he represented London newspapers" (Hogate, 1929), he migrated to New York, and joined the staff of the Wall Street Journal in 1899.

On January 1, 1908, when Sereno S. Pratt, who had been WSJ's editor since late 1905, and the author of The Work of Wall Street (1906), replaced George Wilson (1868-1908) as the secretary of the New York Chamber of Commerce, Hamilton was promoted — directly at the behest of Barron's wife, Jessie Maria Barron (1852-1918), née Barteau, née Waldron — to the position of editor of the Wall Street Journal, where he eventually became a strong advocate of Dow Theory (see: "The six basic tenets of Dow Theory).

"After (Charles Henry) Dow's death in 1902 there followed in quick succession two editors of The Wall Street Journal who were not interested in Dow's theories of market action. Only a year after Dow's death, William Peter Hamilton, who had served as a reporter under Dow from 1899 to 1902, became an editorial writer and, in January, 1908, became editor. While this gives continuity, it should not be thought that Hamilton was an avid disciple of Dow's. In the period 1903 to 1918, he mentioned the Dow theory in four editorials. It was not until he became interested in publishing a book of his own in 1922 that Hamilton began frequent reference to Dow's theory. He mentioned Dow's theory in four out of eight articles in 1921 and seven out of eleven articles in 1922. In the seven years following, he mentioned the theory in eleven out of forty-three editorials." — Woodward, (1968), p.14.
"Hamilton had an uncannay [sic] knowledge of market fluctuations [and, from this,] much of the authority gained by the [Dow] indices [is directly due to Hamilton's efforts] since he chose to utilise them in enunciating his own generalisations, which were really grounded on an extremely sound knowledge of the market". — Torleiv Hytten, The Sydney Morning Herald, August 2, 1938.
"William Hamilton, late editor of the "Wall-street Journal", who wrote many leading articles on the theory first invented by Charles H. Dow, likened the movement of the averages to that of the sea; the tide, gradually coming in or going out, he compared with the primary or year-to-year market trend; the waves he represented as being the intermittent changes. In these broad movements which he called the secondary, or month-to-month trends; and he looked upon the ripples as being the day-to-day changes which are only important because they eventually form the secondary trend." — The West Australian, September 28, 1937.
"William Peter Hamilton . . . had an extraordinary flair for predicting market trends, apart from any scientific method of deduction as the result of studying Dow Jones averages. It is of interest that a few weeks before his death in November 1929 Hamilton correctly called attention to the beginning of the great bear market that was destined to run for nearly five years." — The (Melbourne) Argus, October 18, 1937.

== Barron's National Financial Weekly ==
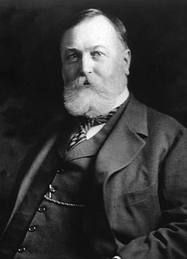
Clarence W. Barron (1855–1928)

In addition to his regular editorials in the WSJ, Hamilton contributed a wide range of articles on financial and economic topics, from time to time, to Barron's National Financial Weekly, a weekly financial newspaper owned by Clarence W. Barron (1855-1928), who also owned the WSJ.

Apart from twenty-or-so excerpts from his forthcoming The Stockmarket Barometer published sequentially between 1921 and 1922, his Barron's contributions included:

- Cycles, And Stock Market Averages, June 6, 1921.
- Like the Dyer's Hand, November 6, 1922.
- An Investment in Education: An Excellent Opportunity for a Rich Benefactor, November 27, 1922.
- The Stock Market Barometer: A Policy of Insurance, December 4, 1922.
- A Stockholder's Plea for Courage, January 15, 1923.
- British Politics and Finance, May 28, 1923.
- A Further Plea for Courage, June 4, 1923.
- How Britain Comes Back, June 4, 1923.
- Britain's Credit Structure, June 11, 1923.
- English and American Financing, June 18, 1923.
- The British Rubber "Monopoly": Not a Menace — Reasons for Giving American Financial Backing, July 2, 1923.
- British Railways in American Eyes: Consolidation's Prospects, Parallels and Limitations, July 16, 1923.
- The Betting Evil in Great Britain, July 23, 1923.
- Government Ownership and Operation: A World-Wide Delusion and Its Failure Under Test, December 17, 1923.
- Observations in the Southwest: Business Men Hopeful of Outlook, but Sick of Politics, March 31, 1924.
- A Study of Kansas City Southern: An Inspection Trip of This Well Managed Road Reveals Interesting Things, April 7, 1924.
- Charles G. Dawes — A Personal Study, June 23, 1924.
- Stock Exchange Settlements: London and New York Methods Compared, July 28, 1924.
- The Stock Market Barometer 1922—1925, February 9, 1925.
- When Virtue has Its own Reward, June 5, 1925.
- Railroads and the East Wind: Change of Policy Needed — A Suggested Representative for All the Railroads, November 16, 1925.
- Washington Impressions: Early Adjournment of Congress Likely — The Woodlock Case, April 19, 1926.
- The British Coal Strike and the Soviet: Leader of Miners Openly Allied with Extremists of Moscow — Certain to Lose, June 28, 1926.
- The Flight from the Franc: Situation Worries French Bankers, July 12, 1926.
- A Misplaced Magnanimity, July 12, 1926.
- The Stock Market Barometer, August 9, 1926.
- A New Condition, March 25, 1929.
- Call Money and Stocks: A Practicable Stock Exchange Reform, April 8, 1929.

== Editorial style ==
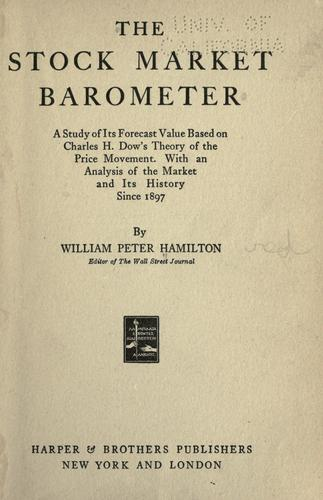
Hamilton's The Stock Market Barometer (1922)

He was renowned for the concise precision of his editorials. In his obituary, the journalist, newspaper publisher, and financial editor of The New York Times from 1896 to 1906, Henry Alloway (1856-1939) spoke of "the logic, force and pungency of [Hamilton's] Wall Street Journal editorial declarations" (Alloway, 1929).

For instance, in Hamilton's WSJ obituary it was noted that:

"Mr. Hamilton's editorials were widely read and there is abundant evidence that time and again they exerted a positive and practical influence. Their appeal to thinking men and women may perhaps be attributed in large part to the facility with which he brushed non-essentials aside and went straight to the heart of the question. This power accounted also for his mastery of condensation; he could say so much in so little space. But this was no mere trick of the pen — it was part of his innate character to think with directness and to speak with candor, wasting no time upon trivial compromises with passing modes of thought. His unusual intellectual vigor, moreover, was suffused by a delicate appreciative humor which frequently gave unexpected and delightful turns to his spoken and written thought." — The Wall Street Journal, December 10, 1929.

In his extended 1922 Editor & Publisher interview, Hamilton directly addressed what he felt was the significant difference between a "real editorial" and others that were "merely lengthy dissertations":

"Of the 22,000 editorials which I estimate the newspapers of the country print each week, 21,500 might far better never have been printed. . . . .
I believe that an editorial should leave the reader with a single thought in his mind and not a multiplicity of unrelated ideas. The true editorial might well be constructed as a simple syllogism — with a major premise founded upon a truth, a minor premise based upon the news of the day, and a conclusion, which is the logical deduction.
You can put your premises, illustrations and conclusions in any way you please, but you must arrest the reader’s attention before the end of the first line. The title can often serve this purpose. This can all be done in not more than 450 words. An editorial needs a mighty good excuse to be longer.
The long editorials that you see too frequently tire the reader before he is half through and, what is more serious, they leave him with a confusion of images and opinions instead of a clearly crystallized thought not the truth implicit in the day’s news.
Why is it that such an overwhelming proportion of the editorials printed throughout the country do not qualify? When you suggest lack of disciplined thought you have gone, I think, to the root of the trouble.
You can’t write a fifty-fifty editorial. Don’t believe the man who tells you that there are two sides to every question. There is only one side to the truth." — Editor & Publisher, September 2, 1922.

== Death ==
He died at his Brooklyn, New York home of pneumonia on December 9, 1929. His funeral services were conducted at Grace Church, in Brooklyn, on Thursday, December 12, 1929.

== Works ==
- 1922: The Stock Market Barometer.
- 1928: The Stock Market Barometer (Revised Edition).

== See also ==
- Dow theory – Stock market trading theory
- Technical analysis – Security analysis methodology
- The Wall Street Journal – American business-focused daily newspaper
