= Cup and handle =

Chart pattern in technical analysis

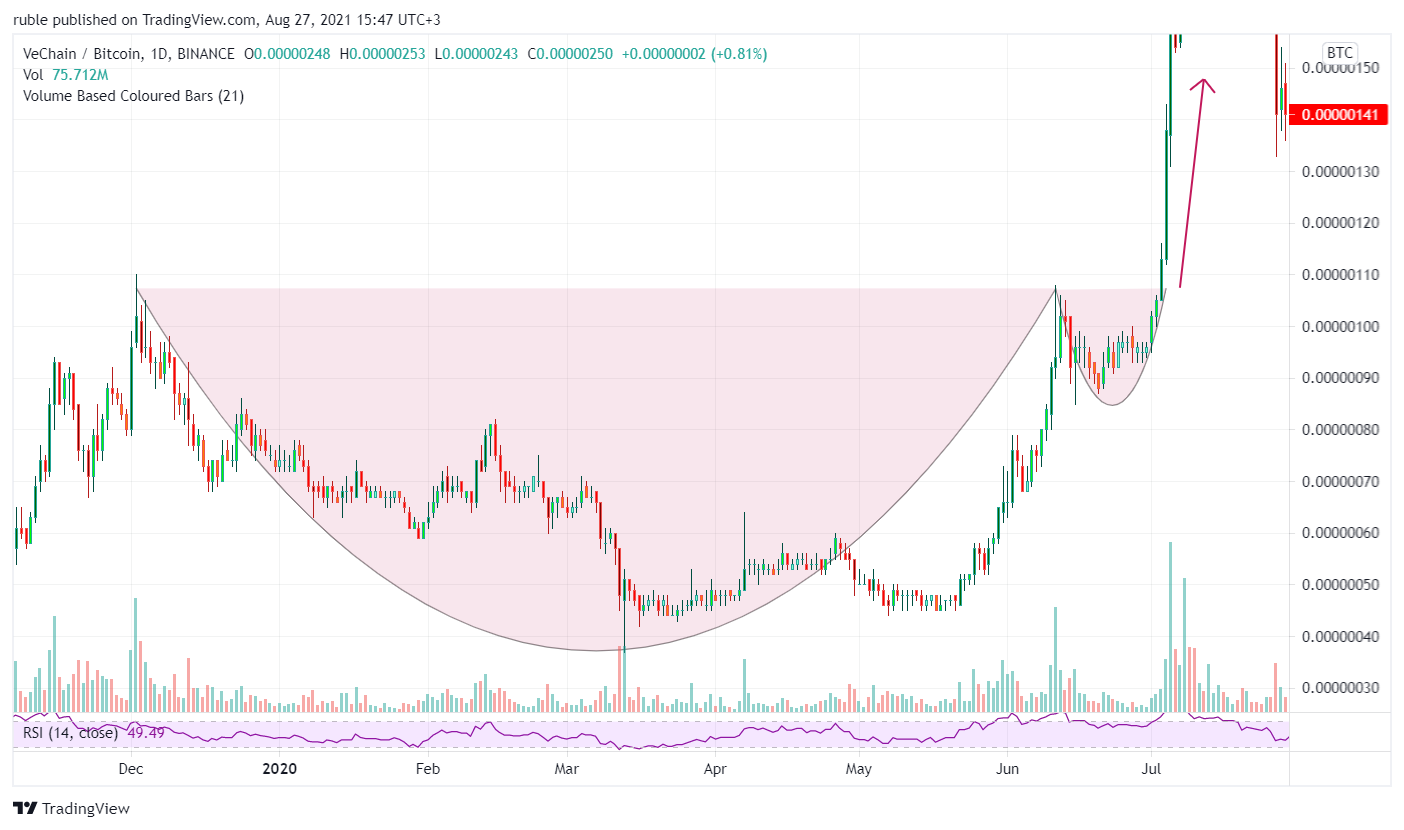
Example of cup and handle chart pattern.

In the domain of technical analysis of market prices, a cup and handle or cup with handle formation is a chart pattern consisting of a drop in the price and a rise back up to the original value, followed first by a smaller drop and then a rise past the previous peak. It is interpreted as an indication of bullish sentiment in the market and possible further price increases.

The cup part of the pattern should be fairly shallow, with a rounded or flat "bottom" (not a V-shaped one), and ideally reach to the same price at the upper end of both sides. The drop of the handle part should retrace about 30% to 50% of the rise at the end of the cup. For stock prices, the pattern may span from a few weeks to a few years; but commonly the cup lasts from 1 to 6 months, while the handle should only last for 1 to 4 weeks.

The "cup and handle" formation was defined by William O'Neil"

== Context and interpretation ==
A cup and handle formation is considered significant when it follows an increasing price trend, ideally one that is only a few months old. The older the increase trend, the less likely it is that the cup and handle will be an accurate indicator. The trade volume should decrease along with the price during the cup and should increase rapidly near the end of the handle when the price begins to rise.
