= John Murphy (technical analyst) =

American financial market analyst

John J. Murphy (August 17, 1942 - February 7, 2026) was an American financial market analyst, and was considered a proponent of inter-market technical analysis, a field pioneered by Michael E.S. Gayed in his 1990 book. He later revised and broadened this book into Technical Analysis of the Financial Markets.

== Life ==
After having graduated in the late 1960s with a liberal arts degree, Murphy searched for a position in a Wall Street firm. His first job was with CIT Financial Corporation, where he worked as an assistant to the portfolio manager and charted stocks. In the early 1970s, he worked for Merrill Lynch in their commodity department where he, later on, was promoted to the post of director of technical analysis. In the 1980s, Murphy started off on his own working as a consultant and teaching evening courses at the New York Institute of Finance. During his time as a teacher, he also wrote his very first book named Technical Analysis of the Futures Markets.

Technical Analysis of the Futures Markets is regarded as a standard reference of technical analysis and is still popular today. Intermarket Analysis: Profiting From Global Market Relationships was a primary source for the Chartered Market Technicians Association Chartered Market Technician Level 3 exam.

He emphasizes the use of exchange-traded funds (ETFs) to implement asset allocation and sector rotation strategies as well as global trading. He was Chief Technical Analyst, at StockCharts.com. His investment opinion has appeared in Barron's.

He has authored several books including Technical Analysis of the Futures Markets. He has appeared on Bloomberg TV, CNN Moneyline, Nightly Business Report, Wall Street Week with Louis Rukeyser and 7 years on CNBC.

After having a stroke and subsequent health issues, he died on February 7, 2026.

== Awards ==
- 1992 outstanding contribution to global technical analysis by the International Federation of Technical Analysts.
- 2002 Market Technicians Association Annual Award.
- Fellow of the Society of Technical Analysts

== Works ==
- Technical Analysis of the Futures Markets. Prentice Hall Press. March 3, 1986. ISBN 978-0-13-898008-5.
- The visual investor: how to spot market trends. John Wiley and Sons. 1996. ISBN 978-0-471-14447-2.
- Technical Analysis of the Financial Markets. Prentice Hall Press. 1999. ISBN 978-0-7352-0066-1.
- Intermarket Analysis. John Wiley and Sons. 2004. ISBN 978-0-471-02329-6.
- Trade Secrets – Charting Made Easy. John J. Murphy. ISBN 978-1883272593
