= TRIN (finance) =

The TRIN, or Arms index, developed by Richard Arms in the 1970s, is a short-term technical analysis stock market trading indicator based on the Advance-Decline Data. The name is short for TRading INdex. The index is calculated as follows:

$$TRIN = \frac {advancing\ issues/declining\ issues} {advancing\ volume/declining\ volume}$$

A value below 1 usually indicates bullish sentiment, and a value above 1 – bearish. A reading reaching 1.5 is very bearish. The index was introduced by Richard Arms, and is continuously displayed during trading hours, among other indices, on the New York Stock Exchange's central wall display for the stocks traded on that exchange.

The denominator of the index is calculated based on number of shares traded, not their dollar value. Therefore, a highly traded stock with a low share price will affect the index more than the same dollar volume traded in a higher-priced stock.

The Arms Index, also known as the TRIN, is part of the galaxy of technical indicators used to measure and predict the movements of the stock market. This indicator reflects the market as a whole, and is used to predict when the overall sentiment of market participants is becoming bullish or bearish. As with other technical indicators, it is most effective when combined with other analytical tools.
