= Advance-Decline Data =

The Advance-Decline data also known as AD data are calculated to show the number of advancing and declining stocks and traded volume associated with these stocks within a market index, stock market exchange or any basket of stocks with purpose of analysis of the sentiment within the analysed group of stocks. Advance-Decline data are used to measure overall market breadth as well as to measure sentiment within the stock market sectors.

First time Advance-Decline data were calculated and analyzed back in 1926 by Colonel Leonard Ayres, an economist and market analyst at the Cleveland Trust Company. Later James Hughes pioneered the "Market Breadth Statistics". In 1931 Barron's started to publish Advance-Decline numbers. Advance-Decline data analysis remained in shadow until the early 1960s when Richard Russell (Dow Theory) started to use them in his "Dow Theory Letters" and Joseph Granville used them in his "Granville Market Letter".

== Advancing and Declining stocks. ==
Stock considered as advancing stock when it is traded above the previous trading session's close price.

Stock is considered as declining stock when it is traded below the previous trading session's close price.

== Advance-Decline Volume ==
Advance Volume refers to the cumulative total number of shares traded for all stocks from the group of the Advancing stocks within a given time frame.

Decline Volume refers to the total cumulative number of shares traded for all stocks from the group of the Declining stocks within a given time frame.

L.M. Lowry, founder of Lowry Research Corporation has been credited with creating the concept of Advancing and Declining Volume in 1938.

== Breadth Indicators ==
Breadth indicators represent the group of technical indicators that are based on the Advance-Decline data.

=== Advance-decline line ===
A-D Line = [Advancing Stocks] – [Declining Stocks] + [Previous Period's A-D Line Value]

=== Advance-Decline Oscillator ===
A-D Oscillator = [Advancing Stocks] – [Declining Stocks]

=== Advance/Decline Ratio ===
A/D Ratio = [Advancing Stocks] / [Declining Stocks]

=== Advance-Decline Percentage Oscillator ===
A/D PO = ([Advancing Stocks] - [Declining Stocks]) / ([Advancing Stocks] + [Declining Stocks]) x 100

=== Absolute Breadth Index ===
ABI = abs([Advancing Stocks] – [Declining Stocks])

=== Breadth Thrust ===
Thrust = [x-Day Moving Average of Advancing Stocks] / [x-Day Moving Average of (Advancing Stocks + Declining Stocks)]

=== TRIN Arms Index (see TRIN (finance)) ===
TRIN = (([Advancing stocks]/[Declining stocks]) / ([Advancing volume]/[Declining volume]))

=== McClellan oscillator ===
McClellan Oscillator = (EMA1 of [(Advancing Issues - Declining Issues)/Total Issues] - EMA2 of [(Advancing Issues - Declining Issues)/total issues]) * 1000

=== McClellan Summation Index ===
Index = Previous Index's Value + Current McClellan Oscillator Value
