= Kumo (sculpture) =

Public art work by Isaac Witkin

Coordinates: 43°10′28.3″N 87°56′09.3″W

- Artist: Isaac Witkin
- Year: 1970
- Type: weathering steel
- Location: Lynden Sculpture Garden; Milwaukee, Wisconsin
- Owner: Bradley Family Foundation

Kumo is a public art work by artist Isaac Witkin located at the Lynden Sculpture Garden near Milwaukee, Wisconsin. The sculpture is an abstract form made of Corten steel curved shapes; it is installed on the lawn.
