= Renko (surname) =

Renko is a surname. Notable people with the surname include:

- Kari Renko (born 1961), Finnish special officer and engineer major general
- Kari Yli-Renko (born 1959), Canadian footballer
- Matthew Renko, ballet dancer
- Serge Renko, French actor
- Steve Renko, baseball player

== Fictional characters ==
- Andy Renko, police officer from Hill Street Blues
- Arkady Renko, fictional detective
- Ivan Renko, fictitious Yugoslav basketball player
- Mike Renko, fictional character from the American TV series NCIS: Los Angeles
- Claudine Renko, a.k.a. Miss Sinister, from the X-Men comics.
