= Breadth of market =

Breadth of market is an indicator used in security analysis. In its simplest form it is computed on a stock market by taking the ratio of the number of advancing stocks to declining stocks.

Market breadth indicators analyze the number of stocks advancing relative to those that are declining in a given index or on a stock exchange, such as the New York Stock Exchange (NYSE) or Nasdaq. Positive market breadth occurs when more stocks are advancing than are declining. This suggests that the bulls are in control of the market's momentum and helps confirm a price rise in the index. Conversely, a disproportional number of declining securities is used to confirm bearish momentum and a downside move in the stock index.

== Bibliography ==
- The complete guide to market breadth indicators by Gregory L. Morris 2005 ISBN 0-07-144443-2
