= Ichimoku Kinkō Hyō =

Technical analysis method

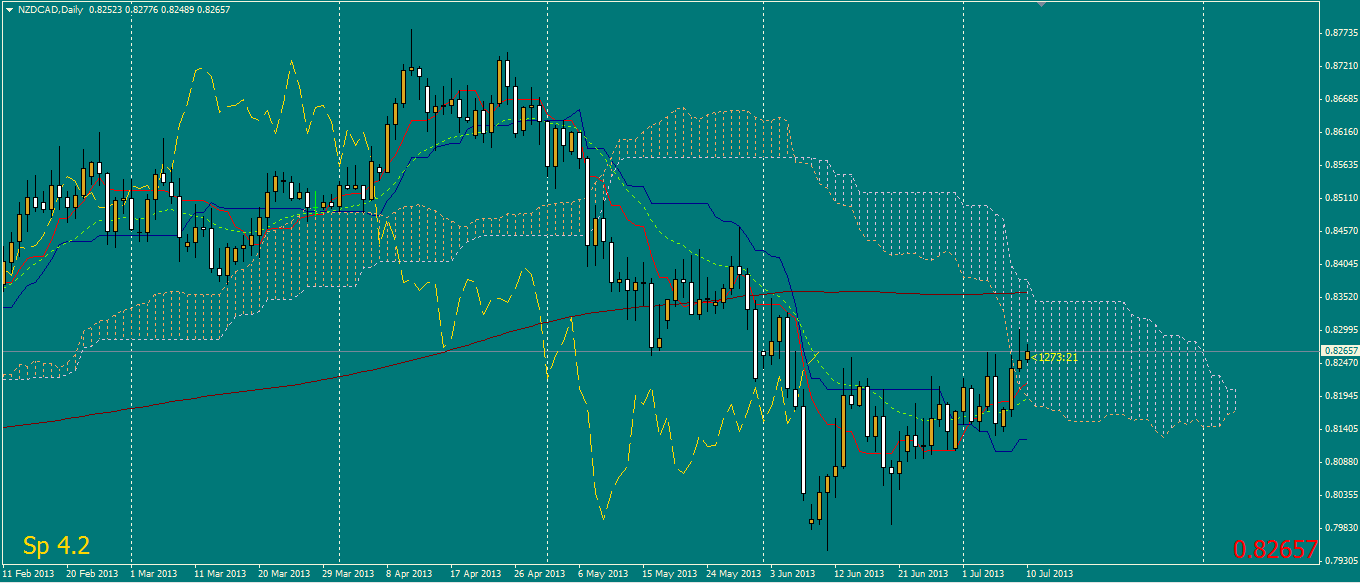
Ichimoku trading system example in the forex market for NZDCAD pair

Ichimoku Kinko Hyo (IKH) (Japanese: 一目均衡表, Hepburn: Ichimoku Kinkō Hyō), usually shortened to "Ichimoku", is a technical analysis method that builds on candlestick charting in an attempt to improve the accuracy of forecast price moves. The chart plots five lines based on recent highs, lows, and closes. Two of the lines create a cloud like image on the chart which gives the technique its name. This method is applied across various asset classes and have been used by traders to predict price movements and regime shifts in global markets.

== History ==
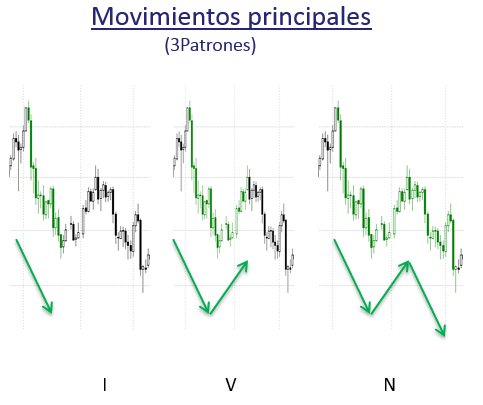
Primary waves at Ichimoku

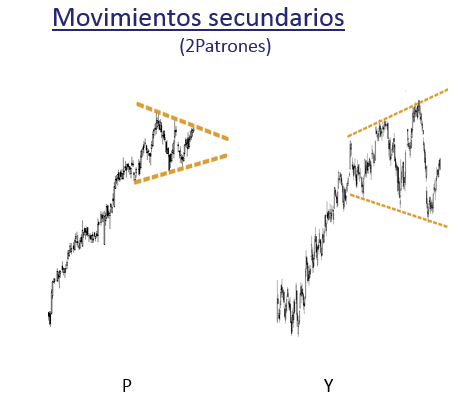
Secondary waves at Ichimoku

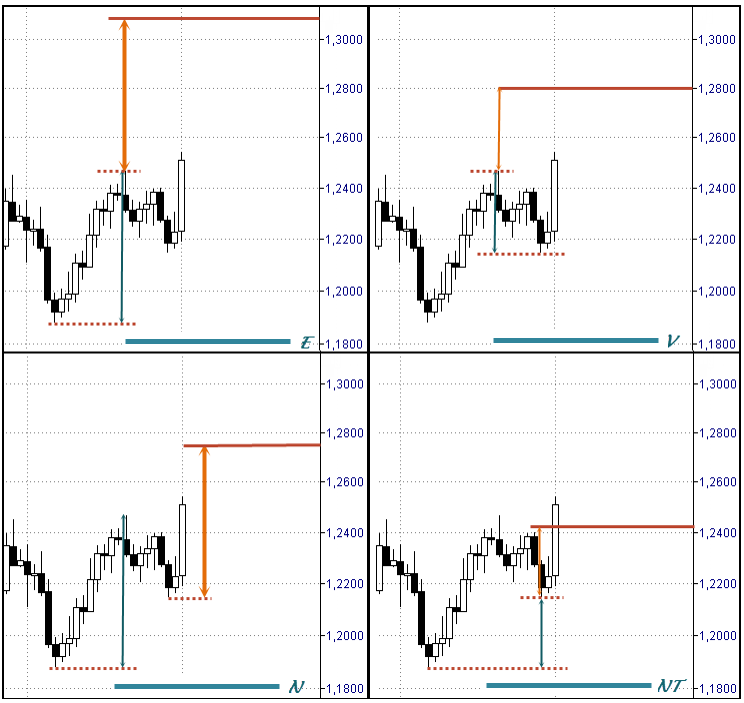
Target levels at Ichimoku

It was developed in the late 1930s by Goichi Hosoda (細田悟一, Hosoda Goichi), a Japanese journalist who used to be known as Ichimoku Sanjin (一目山人, Ichimoku Sanjin), which can be translated as "what a man in the mountain sees". He spent 30 years perfecting the technique before releasing his findings to the general public in the late 1960s.

Ichimoku Kinko Hyo translates to one glance equilibrium chart or instant look at the balance chart and is sometimes referred to as "one glance cloud chart" based on the unique "clouds" that feature in Ichimoku charting.

Ichimoku is a moving average-based trend identification system and because it contains more data points than standard candlestick charts, it provides a clearer picture of potential price action. The main difference between how moving averages are plotted in Ichimoku as opposed to other methods is that Ichimoku's lines are constructed using the 50% point of the highs and lows as opposed to the candle's closing price. Ichimoku takes into consideration the factor of time as an additional element along with the price action, similar to William Delbert Gann's trading ideas.

In the Western world, it is solely known for its “Graphic Environment”, due to the fact that authors have not translated the original manual into English, German, nor Spanish. However, Ichimoku is also integrated by three other theories that improve and enhance the indicator:

- Time Theory
- Wave Movement Theory
- Target Price Theory

== Key elements of Ichimoku's graphic environment ==
=== Tenkan-sen ===
Tenkan-sen (転換線) calculation: (highest high + lowest low)/2 for the last 9 periods.

Also called the conversion line (blue line), it is primarily used as a signal line and a minor support/resistance line. This is the turning line and is derived by averaging the highest high and the lowest low for the past nine periods. The Tenkan Sen is an indicator of the market trend. If the blue line is moving up or down, it indicates that the market is trending. If it moves horizontally, it signals that the market is ranging.

=== Kijun-sen ===
Kijun-sen (基準線) calculation: (highest high + lowest low)/2 for the past 26 periods.

Also called the base line (red line), this is a confirmation line, a support/resistance line, and can be used as a trailing stop line. The Kijun Sen acts as an indicator of future price movement. If the price is higher than the blue line, it could continue to climb higher. If the price is below the blue line, it could keep dropping.

=== Senkou span A ===
Senkou (先行) span A calculation: (Tenkan-sen + kijun-sen)/2 plotted 26 periods ahead.

Also called leading span 1, this line forms one edge of the kumo or cloud.

If the price is above the Senkou span, the top line serves as the first support level while the bottom line serves as the second support level.

If the price is below the Senkou span, the bottom line forms the first resistance level while the top line is the second resistance level.

=== Senkou span B ===
Senkou span B calculation: (highest high + lowest low)/2 calculated over the past 52 time periods and plotted 26 periods ahead.

Also called leading span 2, this line forms the other edge of the Kumo.

=== Kumo ===
Kumo (雲, cloud) is the space between Senkou span A and B. The cloud edges identify current and potential future support and resistance points.

The Kumo cloud changes in shape and height based on price changes. This height represents volatility as larger price movements form thicker clouds, which creates stronger support and resistance. As thinner clouds offer only weak support and resistance, prices can and tend to break through such thin clouds.

Generally, markets are bullish when Senkou Span A is above Senkou Span B and vice versa when markets are bearish. Traders often look for Kumo Twists in future clouds, where Senkou Span A and B exchange positions, a signal of potential trend reversals.

In addition to thickness, the strength of the cloud can also be ascertained by its angle; upwards for bullish and downwards for bearish. Any clouds behind price are also known as Kumo Shadows.

=== Chikou span ===
Chikou (遅行) span calculation: today's closing price projected back 26 days on the chart.

Also called the lagging span it is used as a support/resistance aid.

If the Chikou Span or the green line crosses the price in the bottom-up direction, that is a buy signal. If the green line crosses the price from the top-down, that is a sell signal.

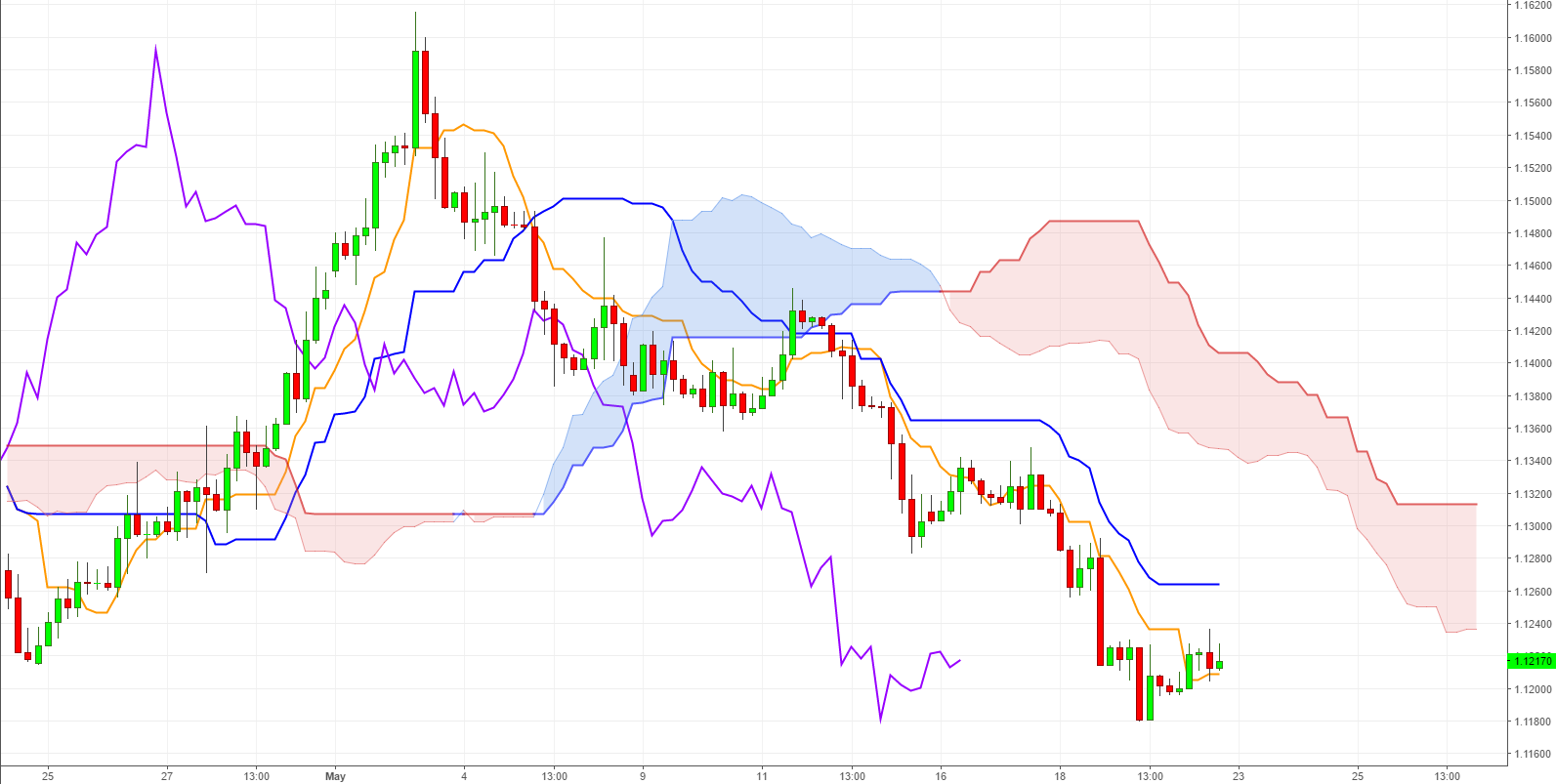
A typical Ichimoku Chart with the analysis forecasting a negative trend for the security as seen by the current price (in candlesticks) trading below the cloud.

== Interpretation ==
In order to interpret the chart, traders think of this technique similarly to a stack of filters and triggers. The clouds, or Kumo, is the area filled in between the two forward spans and is the key to understanding the signals on price direction the chart aims to create. A market price above the cloud would indicate a more favorable outlook for the price of the security, while current market price inside the cloud would signal a fall in value. Another way traders interpret Ichimoku would be a cross of the Tenkan-sen (conversion line) line over the Kijun-sen (base line) which would indicate an increase in the asset's price should it occur above the cloud. However, if the cross happens within the cloud, it's seen as more neutral, and below would suggest the weakest likelihood for a positive price movement. Should the opposite happen, where Tenkan-sen crosses below the Kijun-sen, this would indicate a more bearish move in the price in the same ways. Some experts in the method also require the Chikō Span to chart above the current market price as confirmation of the signals that are being sent.

== Applications and Variations ==
Because the system was developed so many decades ago in the 1930s especially for the Japanese stock market, the standard settings (time periods 9/26/52) are directly tied to the traditional Japanese business calendar of that old era:

- 9 periods (Tenkan-sen): Represented one and a half trading weeks (since people worked 6 days a week back then).
- 26 periods (Kijun-sen): Represented the number of working days in an average month.
- 52 periods (Senkou Span B): Represented two trading months (2 x 26 days).

Today’s business calendar is different in many countries. One and a half trading weeks would be 7.5 days (rounded up to 8 periods). And the number of working days in an average month is around 20.8 days (rounded up to 21 periods).

Therefore a better up-to-date setting for the Ichimoku Kinkō Hyō indicator on the daily time-frame is:

- 8 periods (Tenkan-sen)
- 21 periods (Kijun-sen)
- 42 periods (Senkou Span B)

Others have adapted it to settings like 10/30/60 or 20/60/120 to better suit different assets or markets. A shorter timeframe that the chart looks at, like the 9/26/52 setting, would increase the likelihood of false signals, while a longer setting may increase the amount of time it takes for a signal to be visible on the chart causing a trader to potentially miss a price movement.

Most commonly, Ichimoku charts are used by Equities, Futures, and Foreign Exchange traders who combine Ichimoku signals with other risk management features, like stop-loss trades, that trail the chart's readings.
