= Trix (technical analysis) =

Trix (or TRIX) is a technical analysis oscillator developed in the 1980s by Jack Hutson, editor of Technical Analysis of Stocks and Commodities magazine. It shows the slope (i.e. derivative) of a triple-smoothed exponential moving average. The name Trix is from "triple exponential."

TRIX is a triple smoothed exponential moving average used in technical analysis to follow trends. Positive TRIX values indicate bullish price trends, while negative TRIX values indicate bearish price trends. TRIX crossing zero indicates a trend change. A TRIX signal line, a moving average with a smaller period, is used to anticipate where the TRIX line is headed. TRIX crossing above its signal line implies that the price will likely move higher. TRIX crossing below its signal line implies that the price will likely move lower.

Trix is calculated with a given N-day period as follows:

- Smooth prices (often closing prices) using an N-day exponential moving average (EMA).
- Smooth that series using another N-day EMA.
- Smooth a third time, using a further N-day EMA.
- Calculate the percentage difference between today's and yesterday's value in that final smoothed series.

Like any moving average, the triple EMA is just a smoothing of price data and, therefore, is trend-following. A rising or falling line is an uptrend or downtrend and Trix shows the slope of that line, so it's positive for a steady uptrend, negative for a downtrend, and a crossing through zero is a trend-change, i.e. a peak or trough in the underlying average.

The triple-smoothed EMA is very different from a plain EMA. In a plain EMA the latest few days dominate and the EMA follows recent prices quite closely; however, applying it three times results in weightings spread much more broadly, and the weights for the latest few days are in fact smaller than those of days further past. The following graph shows the weightings for an N=10 triple EMA (most recent days at the left):

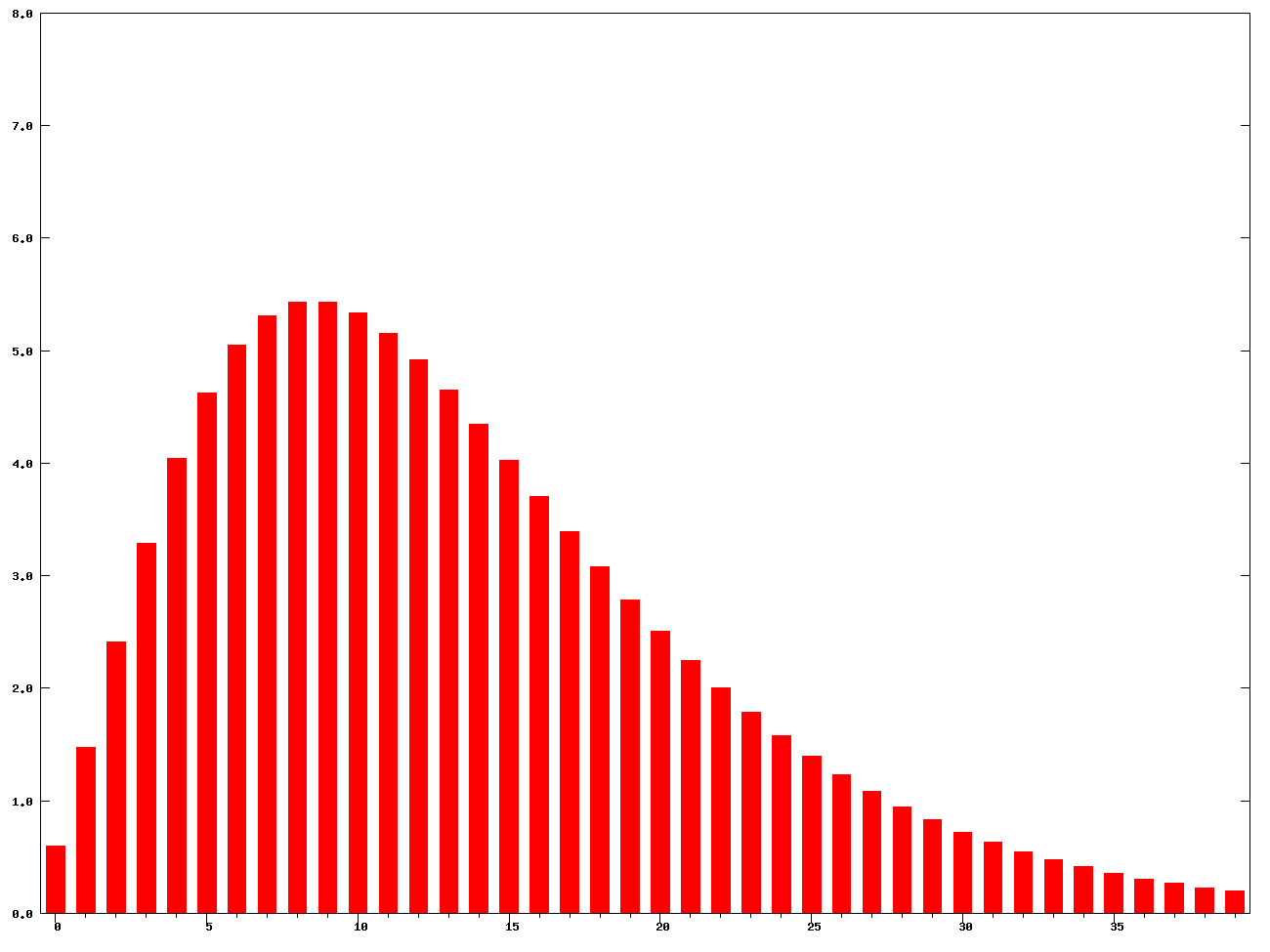
Triple exponential moving average weightings, N=10 (percentage versus days ago)

Note that the distribution's mode will lie with p_{N-2}'s weight, i.e. in the graph above p_{8} carries the highest weighting. An N of 1 is invalid.

The easiest way to calculate the triple EMA based on successive values is just to apply the EMA three times, creating single-, then double-, then triple-smoothed series. The triple EMA can also be expressed directly in terms of the prices as below, with $p_0$ today's close, $p_1$ yesterday's, etc., and with $f = 1 - {2\over N+1} = {N-1\over N+1}$ (as for a plain EMA):

$$TripleEMA_0 = (1-f)^3 (p_0 + 3fp_1 + 6f^2p_2 + 10f^3p_3 + \dots)$$

The coefficients are the triangle numbers, n(n+1)/2. As f is less than 1, the powers $f^n$ decrease faster than the coefficients increase. At a certain point the magnitude of all remaining terms becomes negligible.
