= Trading band =

Financial price range

In finance, a trading band is a range of prices for a commodity or currency, including:

- Currency trading band, a range of prices within which currency exchange rates are controlled
- Keltner channel, a technical indicator, a range of prices above or below a commodity's average price that may signal a changing trend
- Bollinger bands, another technical indicator, a range of prices above and below a commodity's average price that may signal a changing trend

== Use in exchange-rate regimes ==
In foreign-exchange policy, a trading band may refer to a permitted range within which a currency is allowed to fluctuate around a central rate. The International Monetary Fund classifies some exchange-rate arrangements as pegged exchange rates within horizontal bands, where the value of a currency is maintained within stated margins of fluctuation around a fixed central rate.

A prominent example is the European Exchange Rate Mechanism II, under which participating currencies have central rates against the euro and standard fluctuation margins. The European Central Bank notes that participating national central banks may also commit to narrower fluctuation bands than those provided under the mechanism.
