= Flag and pennant patterns =

Financial chart patterns

The flag and pennant patterns are commonly found patterns in the price charts of financially traded assets (stocks, bonds, futures, etc.). The patterns are characterized by a clear direction of the price trend, followed by a consolidation and rangebound movement, which is then followed by a resumption of the trend. They are continuation patterns and form when the asset prices rally or fall sharply.

== Flag pattern ==
The flag pattern is encompassed by two parallel lines. These lines can be either flat or pointed in the opposite direction of the primary market trend. The pole is formed by a line which represents the primary trend in the market. The pattern, which could be bullish or bearish, is seen as the market potentially just taking a "breather" after a big move before continuing its primary trend. The chart below illustrates a bull flag. A bear flag would trend in the opposite direction.

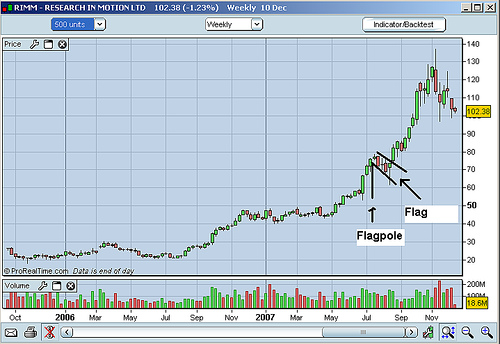

== Pennant pattern ==
A classic pattern for technical analysts, the pennant pattern is identifiable by a large price move, followed by a consolidation period and a breakout. The pattern resembles a flagpole. The pennant phase is identified by an initial large price movement indicating high volume transactions, followed by weaker price movement indicating low volume transactions. Traders earn by capitalizing on the breakout phase. The pennant pattern is identical to the flag pattern in its setup and implications; the only difference is that the consolidation phase of a pennant pattern is characterized by converging trend lines rather than parallel trend lines. The image below illustrates the pennant pattern.

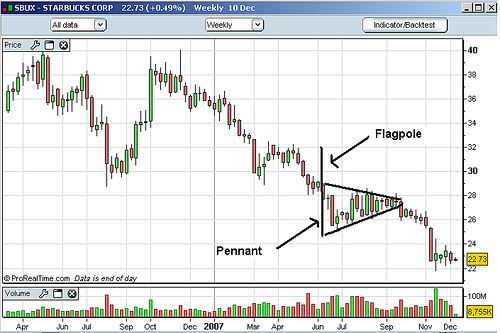
