= Technical Analysis of Stocks & Commodities =

Monthly magazine

Technical Analysis of Stocks & Commodities is an American, Seattle-based monthly magazine about commodity futures contracts, stocks, options, derivatives, and forex. The magazine focuses on trading strategies, technical indicators, and software tools for active traders in equities, futures, crypto, forex and options markets.

== History and profile ==
Technical Analysis of Stocks & Commodities was founded in 1982 by Boeing mechanical engineer Jack Hutson who wanted people to learn about technical analysis. Hutson had a brief foray in the stock market in the late 1960s and bought two additional houses in the 1970s before returning to securities in 1980. Using his engineering and analytic background, he for hours delved into trading concepts by reading books in library. He purchased a personal computer system for $7,500 to allow him to automatically generate a chart that would take hours if created manually. When the software for a specific technical concept did not work, Hutson asked Boeing colleague and math doctorate Anthony Warren to collaborate with him to fix the program. After they corrected the software, a technicians congregation gathering in Toronto invited Hutson to Toronto to introduce his work. To ready himself for the conference, Hutson wrote a paper that became the foundation of Technical Analysis of Stocks & Commodities's inaugural October 1982 issue.

Hutson originally planned to work full-time at Boeing and part-time at the magazine as a supplement to his trading. In a year, Technical Analysis of Stocks & Commodities had 1,500 subscribers and cost $250 for an annual subscription. In 1984, its annual price dropped and subscribers increased to over 10,000. The magazine started occupying 60 to 70 hours of Hutson's time every week, so he resigned from Boeing in 1984. By 1988, it had 12 employees and was headquartered in the building of the no longer existing Fauntleroy Elementary School.

In 2013, the magazine had 60,000 subscribers, and 90% of its articles were written by freelancers.

Technical Analysis of Stocks & Commodities covers global industry trends, prominent people, trading technology, managed funds, and fundamental and technical analysis. The magazine covers the financial markets, with articles on industry issues, current market developments, trading techniques and strategies, and other areas of interest to traders and risk managers. It contains articles, analysis and strategies for derivatives traders and money managers.
