= NVI =

NVI may refer to:

== Computing ==
- nvi, a 1990s text editor
- Non-virtual interface pattern, a software design pattern

== Transport and mail ==
- No value indicator, a non-denominated postage stamp
- Nationale Vliegtuig Industrie, a Dutch aircraft manufacturer; see Frederick Koolhoven
- Avial NV, a Russian airline (2000–2011; ICAO:NVI)
- Navoiy Airport, Uzbekistan (opened 1962; IATA:NVI)

== Other uses ==
- Negative volume index, of financial markets
- Neurological visual impairment
- Nueva Versión Internacional, a 1999 Bible edition in Spanish

== See also ==
- NUI (disambiguation)
- NVIS (disambiguation)
