= Chaikin =

Chaikin is an Ashkenazi Jewish matronymic surname, a variant of Chaykin. Notable people with the surname include:

- Andrew Chaikin (born 1956), American author and science journalist, known for writing A Man on the Moon
- Andrew Chaikin, known by the stage name Kid Beyond, American singer
- Azriel Chaikin (born 1938), Chief Rabbi of the Chabad movement in Ukraine
- Carly Chaikin (born 1990), American actress
- Carol Chaikin, American jazz musician
- Joseph Chaikin (1935–2003), American theater director and playwright
- Linda Chaikin (born 1943), American historical fiction author
- Marc Chaikin, American finance analyst, founder of Chaikin Analytics
- Matt Chaikin, American former drummer for Kommunity FK and Jane's Addiction
- Miriam Chaikin (1924–2015), writer and poet
- Paul Chaikin (born 1945), American physicist and New York University professor
- Sol Chick Chaikin (1918–1991), American trade union organizer
- Valentin Chaikin (1925–2018), Russian speed skater

== See also ==
- Chaiken
