= Volume analysis =

Metric for shares traded over time

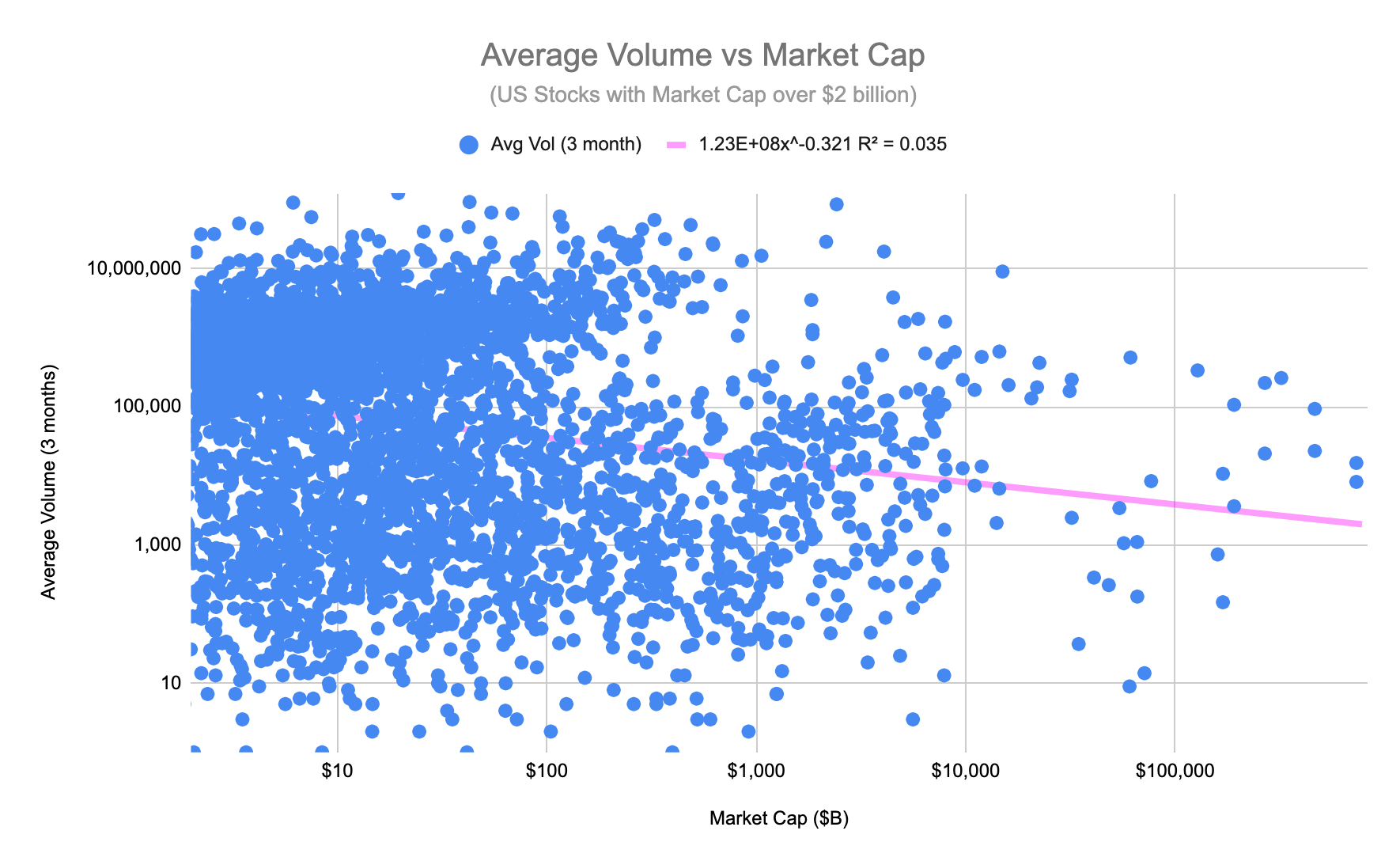
Average Volume (3 months) vs Market Capitalization

Volume Analysis (also referred to as price–volume trend and volume oscillators) is an example of a type of technical analysis that examines the volume of traded securities to confirm and predict price trends. Volume is a measure of the number of shares of an asset (such as a stock or bond) that are traded in a given period of time. As one of the oldest market indicators used for analysis, sudden changes in volume are often the result of news-related events. Commonly used by chartists and technical analysts, volume analysis is centered on the following ideas:

- When the volume of a security is increasing or at a relative peak, the current trend in price is confirmed and is said to have momentum
- When the volume of a security is decreasing or at a relative minimum, the current trend in price is fragile and is said to lack momentum

== Theory ==
Volume analysis is used to confirm and predict price directions. The theory behind volume analysis rests primarily on the assumption that a high trade volume signals market consensus behind the corresponding movement in price, and thus that the trend in price is likely to continue. Conversely, a comparatively low volume is interpreted as an indication that the market does not agree with the current price behavior, and is a possible signal of a price trend reversal. In a more applied context:

- a distinctive increase in price with a distinctive increase in volume might signal the continuation of a bullish trend of a bullish reversal

Conversely,

- a distinctive decrease in price with a distinctive increase in volume might signal the continuation of a bearish trend of a bearish reversal

In addition to analyzing the fluctuations in volume of a single security, analysis is also often performed on the market volume as a whole. In this way, individual trends in an asset's price and volume can be discerned from the trends of the market as a whole.

=== Spikes and blow offs ===
A caveat to the logic presented above is in the case of exceedingly extreme changes in volume, which can be generally defined as five to ten times the normal volume for that period of time. These cases are referred to as exhaustion, because there will often be no one left to participate in the market, and thus the price will stop moving along its previous trajectory. In a more applied context:

- a sharp increase in price with a sharp increase in volume might signal that all bulls have been exhausted, and that the resultant price trend is bearish

Conversely,

- a sharp decrease in price with a sharp increase in volume might signal that all bears have been exhausted, and that the resultant price trend is bullish

=== Liquidity ===
Volume is also a useful metric for determining the liquidity of an asset. Liquidity is a measure of how easily an asset can be bought or sold without dramatically affecting the asset's price. Therefore, a market for a security in which there are many buyers and sellers would feature a large volume and thus high liquidity.

Due to volume's relevance with respect to liquidity, it is used by some traders to form exit strategies, due to the inherent risks of trading an asset with low liquidity. Traders may also form entry or exit strategies based the relative liquidity of an asset by comparing volume to historical averages.

== Applications ==
The theory of volume analysis is employed by traders in several ways:

=== Positive and Negative Volume Index ===
Developed by Paul Dysart in the 1930s, the Positive Volume Index (PVI) and the Negative Volume Index (NVI) incorporate volume into a quantifiable metric that is used to evaluate price reversals. Both the PVI and NVI are functions of the volume and closing price for the previous period of time. The PVI is recalculated when the trading volume increases from the previous period, and the NVI is recalculated when the trading volume decrease from the previous period. These two metrics, when put together, show how volume is affecting the price of a security. A change in PVI indicates that prices are driven by high volumes. A change in the NVI indicates that prices are changing without an effect from volume. Many investors will often follow the NVI more closely than the PVI, a some believe that noise trading is a significant factor in the PVI.

=== Chaikin Money Flow ===
Making the assumption that a price increase comes with an associated increase in volume, the Chaikin Money Flow calculates the corresponding strength of a price move with the closing price is in the upper or lower portion of its range for that period.

If the price close for a period is toward the top of its inter-period range and volume is increasing, the values for this indicator will be high. If the converse, the output values will be low. Because of this nature, the Chaikin money flow is often modeled as a short term oscillator. It is also often used to detect divergence between price and volume.

=== Klinger Volume Oscillator ===
Developed by Stephen Klinger, the Klinger Volume Oscillator is used to predict long-term trends of the flow of money while staying responsive enough to be affected by short term fluctuations in volume. The indicator is a function of the trade volume and price trends for a given security, whole output takes the form of an oscillator. The KVO is the difference between the short- and long-term moving averages. Divergence of these values could signal a price trend reversal.

The KVO is based on the idea of force volume, which itself is a function of the volume, price trend, and temp. Temp is a series of if/then statements involving volume and price. The oscillator is then computed as the exponential moving averages of volume force for different time periods. In this way, the KVO accounts for long-term and short-term price direction as a function of the volume flowing through the security. Volume analysis tools are featured in several trading platforms, such as NinjaTrader, ATAS, or Sierra Chart, which offer indicators like footprint charts, delta, and order flow visualizations.
