= Chaiken =

Chaiken is a surname of Yiddish origin. Notable people with the surname include:

- David Chaiken, computer programmer and developer of X2x
- Ilene Chaiken (born 1957), creator, writer and executive producer of the television series The L Word
- Ilya Chaiken (born 1973), American film director and screenwriter
- Jen Chaiken, American film producer
- Julie Chaiken, American fashion designer
- Shelly Chaiken (born 1949), American psychologist

== See also ==
- Chaikin
- Chaykin
