= Nuis =

Surname list

Nuis is a surname. Notable people with the surname include:

- Aad Nuis (1933–2007), Dutch politician and political scientist
- Kjeld Nuis (born 1989), Dutch speed skater

== See also ==
- Nuis, Netherlands, a village in Groningen
- NUI (disambiguation)
