= Tontine Coffee House =

Coffeehouse in Manhattan, New York

Coordinates: 40°42′20″N 74°00′29″W

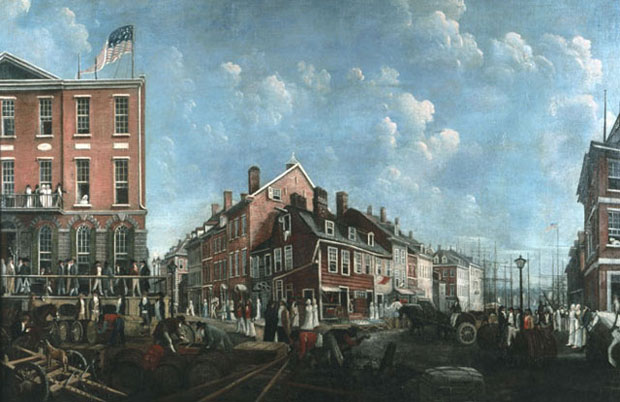
- A 1797 painting by Francis Guy. The building with the American flag is the Tontine Coffee House. Diagonally opposite (southeast corner, extreme right) is the Merchant's Coffee House, where the stockbrokers of the Buttonwood Agreement and others traded before the construction of the Tontine. On the right is Wall Street, leading down to the East River.
- Interactive map of the Tontine Coffee House area

General information
- Opened: 1793
- Demolished: 1855

The Tontine Coffee House was a coffeehouse in Manhattan, New York City, established in early 1793. Situated at 88 Wall Street, on the northwest corner with Water Street, it was built by a group of stockbrokers to serve as a meeting place for trade and correspondence. It was organized as a tontine, a type of investment plan, and funded by the sale of 203 shares of £200 each. The May 17, 1792, creation of the Buttonwood Agreement, which bound its signatories to trade only with each other, effectively gave rise to a new organization of tradespeople.

== History ==
In its prime, the Tontine was among New York City's busiest centers for the buying and selling of stocks and other wares, for business dealings and discussion, and for political transaction. Having had a dual function as a combination club and a meeting room, the coffee house played host to auctions, banquets, and balls, among others. After hours, gambling and securities dealings were had – undertakings that were then deemed less than honest. The coffee house also provided a place for the registration of ship cargo and the trading of slaves. The Tontine was noted as classless; individuals from all social strata met there and collectively engaged in the many civil and economic affairs. John Lambert, an English traveler, wrote in 1807:

The Tontine Coffee House was filled with underwriters, brokers, merchants, traders, and politicians; selling, purchasing, trafficking, or insuring; some reading, others eagerly inquiring the news […] The steps and balcony of the coffee-house were crowded with people bidding, or listening to the several auctioneers, who had elevated themselves upon a hogshead of sugar, a puncheon of rum, or a bale of cotton; and with Stentorian voices were exclaiming, "Once, twice. Once, twice." "Another cent." "Thank ye gentlemen." [...] The coffee-house slip, and the corners of Wall and Pearl-streets, were jammed up with carts, drays, and wheelbarrows [...] Everything was in motion; all was life, bustle and activity...

Political demonstrations and violence were not uncommon at the Tontine Coffee House. In the wake of the French Revolution, fistfights between those respectively sympathetic to the British and the French broke out on a daily basis. An anonymous observer wrote:

Whenever two or three people are gather'd together, it is expected there is a Quarrel and they crowd round, hence other squabbles arise.

On one occasion, French Revolutionists and supporters of the Tammany Hall movement scaled the coffee house and placed a French Liberty Cap on the roof. Several New York publications mentioned the event – in particular, those newspapers with pro-Jacobin or pro–Democratic-Republican slants applauded the perpetrators and encouraged the Tontine's proprietors to allow the Cap to remain. In addition, an onlooker named Alexander Anderson describes conflict between Whigs and Torys at the Tontine in a June 11, 1793, diary entry:

[L]ast night there was an affray at the Tontine Coffee House between Whig and Tory, or to modernize it, aristocrat and democrat.

In December 1793, New York's Columbian Gazetteer complained that "only persons of the same party" would now associate within the Tontine.

Trading at the Tontine Coffee House continued until 1817. The growth of the Tontine's trade proceedings had effected the creation of the New York Stock and Exchange Board (NYSEB) and necessitated a larger venue. The NYSEB is recognized as the precursor to the present-day New York Stock Exchange, the largest stock exchange in the world. The Tontine itself was transformed into a tavern by a John Morse in 1826, and a hotel by Lovejoy & Belcher in 1832. It survived the Great Fire of 1835 and was demolished in the spring of 1855 to make way for a larger Tontine coffee house. The newer building was itself demolished in 1901.

== Notes ==
- Antol, Marie Nadine (2002). Confessions of a Coffee Bean: The Complete Guide to Coffee Cuisine. Square One Publishers, Inc. ISBN 0-7570-0020-7.
- Fisher, Byron (2007). The Supply and Demand Paradox: A Treatise on Economics. BookSurge. ISBN 978-1-4196-6427-4.
- Gilje, Paul (1987). The road to mobocracy: popular disorder in New York City, 1763–1834. UNC Press. ISBN 0-8078-4198-6.
- Hewitt, Robert (Jr.) (1872). Coffee: Its History, Cultivation, and Uses. New York: D. Appleton and Company.
- Nathans, Heather (2003). Early American theatre from the revolution to Thomas Jefferson: into the hands of the people. Cambridge University Press. ISBN 0-521-82508-3.
- Sobel, Robert (2000). The Big Board: A History of the New York Stock Market. Beard Books. ISBN 1-893122-66-2.
- Still, Bayrd (1994). Mirror for Gotham: New York as seen by contemporaries from Dutch days to the present. Fordham University Press. ISBN 0-8232-1529-6.
