= Buttonwood Agreement =

1792 founding document of the New York Stock Exchange

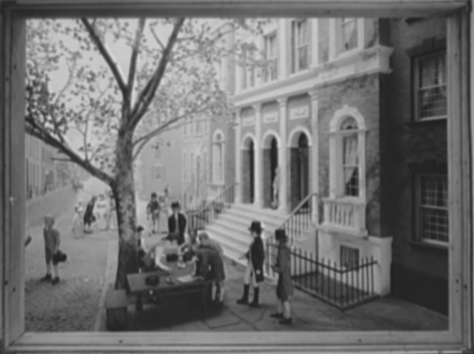
Depiction of traders under the buttonwood tree

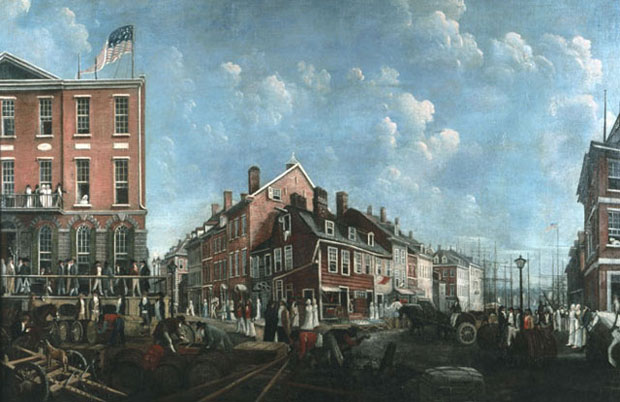
A 1797 painting by Francis Guy. The building with the American flag is the Tontine Coffee House. Diagonally opposite (southeast corner, extreme right) is the Merchant's Coffee House, where the brokers of the Buttonwood Agreement and others traded before the construction of the Tontine. On the right is Wall Street, leading down to the East River.

The Buttonwood Agreement is the founding document of what is now the New York Stock Exchange and is one of the most important financial documents in U.S. history. The agreement organized securities trading in New York City and was signed on May 17, 1792 between 24 stockbrokers outside of 68 Wall Street. According to legend the signing took place under a buttonwood tree where their earliest transactions had occurred. The New York Stock Exchange celebrates the signing of this agreement on May 17, 1792 as its founding.

== History ==
In March 1792, twenty-four of New York's leading merchants met secretly at Corre's Hotel to discuss ways to bring order to the securities business. Two months later, on May 17, 1792, the group signed a document called the Buttonwood Agreement, named after their traditional meeting place under a buttonwood tree – not because it was signed there.

There were too many brokers involved to meet under a tree. Business was conducted in various offices and coffee houses. In 1793, they coordinated their business inside the Tontine Coffee House on the corner of Wall and Water streets.

The document is now part of the archival collection of the New York Stock Exchange.

The site of the Buttonwood Agreement today is commemorated with a plaque on the side of the Wall Street Hotel, at the corner of Wall Street and Pearl Street.

== Document agreement ==
In brief, the agreement had two provisions: 1) the brokers were to deal only with each other, thereby eliminating the auctioneers, and 2) the commissions were to be 0.25%. It reads as follows:

We the Subscribers, Brokers for the Purchase and Sale of the Public Stock, do hereby solemnly promise and pledge ourselves to each other, that we will not buy or sell from this day for any person whatsoever, any kind of Public Stock, at a less rate than one quarter percent Commission on the Specie value and that we will give preference to each other in our Negotiations. In Testimony whereof we have set our hands this 17th day of May at New York, 1792.

== Signers ==
The twenty-four brokers, known as Founding and Subsequent Fathers, who signed the Buttonwood Agreement were (including business location):

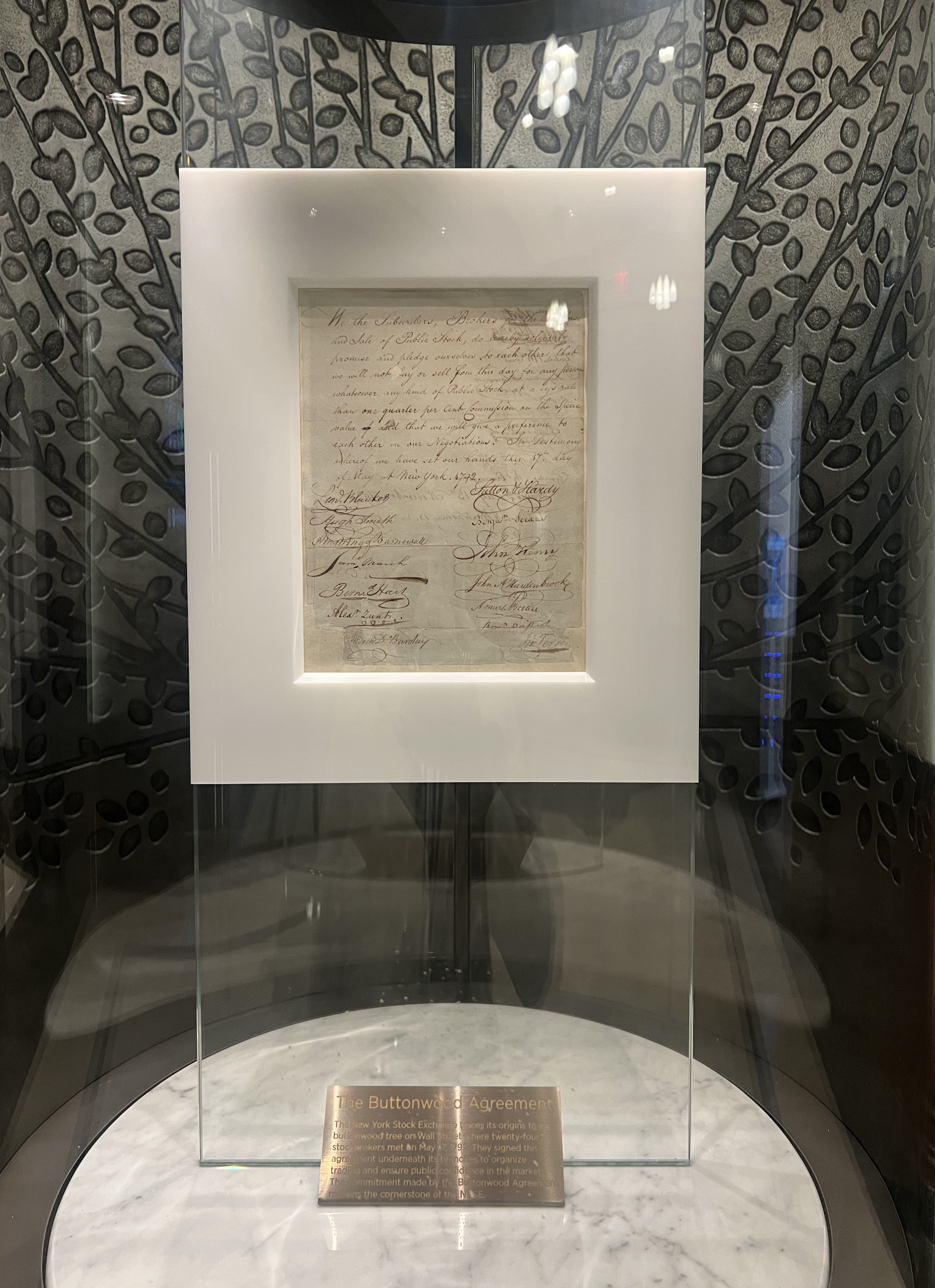
Buttonwood Agreement at NYSE HQ

- Peter Anspach … 3 Great Dock Street
- Armstrong & Barnewall … 58 Broad Street
- Andrew D. Barclay … 136 Pearl Street
- Samuel Beebe … 21 Nassau Street
- G. N. Bleecker … 21 Broad Street
- Leonard Bleecker … 16 Wall Street
- John Bush … 195 Water Street
- John Ferrers … 205 Water Street
- Isaac M. Gomez … 32 Maiden Lane
- Bernard Hart … 55 Broad Street
- John A. Hardenbrook … 24 Nassau Street
- Ephraim Hart … 74 Broadway
- John Henry … 13 Duke Street
- Augustine H. Lawrence … 132 Water Street
- Samuel March … 243 Queen Street
- Charles McEvers Jr. … 194 Water Street
- Julian McEvers … 140 Greenwich Street
- David Reedy … 58 Wall Street (signed November 13, 1794)
- Robinson & Hartshorne … 198 Queen Street (signed November 13, 1794)
- Benjamin Seixas … 8 Hanover Square
- Hugh Smith … Tontine Coffee House
- Sutton & Hardy … 20 Wall Street
- Benjamin Winthrop … 2 Great Dock Street
- Alexander Zuntz … 97 Broad Street
