= Chaykin =

Chaykin (Slavic feminine: Chaykina) is a Jewish matronymic surname derived from the belittling diminutive Chayka of the female given name Chaya. It may also be a Russian surname derived from the word "chaika" "sea gull". The first consonant in the two names is pronounced differently. Variants are Chaikin and Chaiken.

Notable people with the surname include:

- Howard Chaykin (born 1950), American comic book artist and writer
- Konstantin Chaykin (born 1975), Russian watchmaker, inventor and painter
- Maury Chaykin (1949–2010), American-Canadian actor
- Yelizaveta Chaykina

== Fictional characters ==
- Lester Knight Chaykin, protagonist of the 1991 video game Another World
