= Rule 48 =

Rule of the New York Stock Exchange

Rule 48, also known as Exemptive Relief — Extreme Market Volatility Condition, was a mechanism used by the New York Stock Exchange to ease market opening while volatility is high. It may have the effect of pre-empting trading at disrupted prices, as the designated market makers do not have to disseminate price indications prior to the opening bell. It was approved in 2007 and repealed in 2016.

== History ==
Rule 48 was approved by the U.S. Securities and Exchange Commission on December 6, 2007. It was invoked 77 times from 2008 to September 2015, but only used a few times. For example, it was used on January 22, 2008, and May 20, 2010, as well as September 1, 2015. In the aftermath of disorderly trading on August 24, 2015, the NYSE proposed new rules replacing Rule 48 to handle volatility at market opening. These rules were approved by the SEC in July 2016.
