= NVIS =

NVIS can refer to:

- National Vegetation Information System, a geodataset of Australian habitats
- Near Vertical Incidence Skywave, in radio communication
- Night Vision Imaging System, in military optics

== See also ==
- NVI (disambiguation)
