= Negative volume index =

The Negative Volume Index and Positive Volume Index are indicators to identify primary market trends and reversals when using technical analysis to study financial markets.

== History ==
In 1936, Paul L. Dysart, Jr. began accumulating two series of advances and declines distinguished by whether volume was greater or lesser than the prior day's volume. He called the cumulative series for the days when volume had been greater than the prior day's volume the Positive Volume Index (PVI), and the series for the days when volume had been lesser the Negative Volume Index (NVI).

A native of Iowa, Dysart worked in Chicago's LaSalle Street during the 1920s. After giving up his Chicago Board of Trade membership, he published an advisory letter geared to short-term trading using advance-decline data. In 1933, he launched the Trendway weekly stock market letter and published it until 1969 when he died. Dysart also developed the 25-day Plurality Index, the 25-day total of the absolute difference between the number of advancing issues and the number of declining issues, and was a pioneer in using several types of volume of trading studies. Richard Russell, editor of Dow Theory Letters, in his January 7, 1976 letter called Dysart "one of the most brilliant of the pioneer market technicians."

== Dysart's NVI and PVI ==
The daily volume of the New York Stock Exchange and the NYSE Composite Index's advances and declines drove Dysart's indicators. Dysart believed that "volume is the driving force in the market". He began studying market breadth numbers in 1931, and was familiar with the work of Leonard P. Ayres and James F. Hughes, who pioneered the tabulation of advances and declines to interpret stock market movements.

Dysart calculated NVI as follows: 1) if today's volume is less than yesterday's volume, subtract declines from advances, 2) add the difference to the cumulative NVI beginning at zero, and 3) retain the current NVI reading for the days when volume is greater than the prior day's volume. He calculated PVI in the same manner but for the days when volume was greater than the prior day's volume. NVI and PVI can be calculated daily or weekly.

Initially, Dysart believed that PVI would be the more useful series, but in 1967, he wrote that NVI had "proved to be the most valuable of all the breadth indexes". He relied most on NVI, naming it AMOMET, the acronym of "A Measure Of Major Economic Trend."

Dysart's theory, expressed in his 1967 Barron's article, was that "if volume advances and prices move up or down in accordance [with volume], the move is assumed to be a good movement - if it is sustained when the volume subsides". In other words, after prices have moved up on positive volume days, "if prices stay up when the volume subsides for a number of days, we can say that such a move is 'good'". If the market "holds its own on negative volume days after advancing on positive volume, the market is in a strong position".

He called PVI the "majority" curve. Dysart distinguished between the actions of the "majority" and those of the "minority". The majority tends to emulate the minority, but its timing is not as sharp as that of the minority. When the majority showed an appetite for stocks, the PVI was usually "into new high ground" as happened in 1961.

It is said that the two indicators assume that "smart" money is traded on quiet days (low volume) and that the crowd trades on very active days. Therefore, the negative volume index picks out days when the volume is lower than on the previous day, and the positive index picks out days with a higher volume.

== Dysart's Interpretation of NVI and PVI ==
Besides an article he wrote for Barron's in 1967, not many of Dysart's writings are available. What can be interpreted about Dysart's NVI is that whenever it rises above a prior high, and the DJIA is trending up, a "Bull Market Signal" is given. When the NVI falls below a prior low, and the DJIA is trending down, a "Bear Market Signal" is given. The PVI is interpreted in reverse. However, not all movements above or below a prior NVI or PVI level generate signals, as Dysart also designated "bullis" and "bearish penetrations". These penetrations could occur before or after a Bull or Bear Market Signal, and at times were called "reaffirmations" of a signal. In 1969, he articulated one rule: "signals are most authentic when the NVI has moved sideways for a number of months in a relatively narrow range". Dysart cautioned that "there is no mathematical system devoid of judgment which will continuously work without error in the stock market".

According to Dysart, between 1946 and 1967, the NVI "rendered 17 significant signals", of which 14 proved to be right (an average of 4.32% from the final high or low) and 3 wrong (average loss of 6.33%). However, NVI "seriously erred" in 1963-1964 and in 1968, which concerned him. In 1969, Dysart reduced the weight he had previously given to the NVI in his analyses because NVI was no longer a "decisive" indicator of the primary trend, although it retained an "excellent ability to give us 'leading' indications of short-term trend reversals."

A probable reason for the NVI losing its efficacy during the mid-1960s may have been the steadily higher NYSE daily volume due to the dramatic increase in the number of issues traded so that prices rose on declining volume. Dysart's NVI topped out in 1955 and trended down until at least 1968, although the DJIA moved higher during that period. Norman G. Fosback has attributed the "long term increase in the number of issues traded" as a reason for a downward bias in a cumulative advance-decline line. Fosback was the next influential technician in the story of NVI and PVI.

== Fosback's Variations ==
Fosback studied NVI and PVI and in 1976 reported his findings in his classic Stock Market Logic. He did not elucidate on the indicators' background or mentioned Dysart except for saying that "in the past Negative Volume Indexes have always [his emphasis] been constructed using advance-decline data". He posited, "There is no good reason for this fixation on the A/D Line. In truth, a Negative Volume Index can be calculated with any market index - the Dow Jones Industrial Average, the S&P 500, or even 'unweighted' market measures.... Somehow this point has escaped the attention of technicians to date."

The point had not been lost on Dysart, who wrote in Barron's, "we prefer to use the issues-traded data [advances and declines] rather than the price data of any average because it is more all-encompassing, and more truly represents what's happening in the entire market". Dysart was a staunch proponent of using advances and declines.

Fosback made three variations to NVI and PVI:

1. He cumulated the daily percent change in the market index rather than the difference between advances and declines. On negative volume days, he calculated the price change in the index from the prior day and added it to the most recent NVI. His calculations are as follows:

If C_{t} and C_{y} denote the closing prices of today and yesterday, respectively, the NVI for today is calculated by

- adding NVI_{yesterday} (C_{t} - C_{y}) / C_{y} to yesterday's NVI if today's volume is lower than yesterday's, adding zero otherwise,

and the PVI is calculated by:

- adding PVI_{yesterday} (C_{t} - C_{y}) / C_{y} to yesterday's PVI if today's volume is higher than yesterday's, adding zero otherwise.

2. He suggested starting the cumulative count at a base index level such as 100.

3. He derived buy or sell signals by whether the NVI or PVI was above or below its one-year moving average.

Fosback's versions of NVI and PVI are what are popularly described in books and posted on Internet financial sites. Often reported are his findings that whenever NVI is above its one-year moving average there is a 96% (PVI - 79%) probability that a bull market is in progress, and when it is below its one-year moving average, there is a 53% (PVI - 67%) probability that a bear market is in place. These results were derived using a 1941-1975 test period. Modern tests might reveal different probabilities.

Today, NVI and PVI are commonly associated with Fosback's versions, and Dysart, their inventor, is forgotten. It cannot be said that one version is better than the other. While Fosback provided a more objective interpretation of these indicators, Dysart's versions offer value to identify primary trends and short-term trend reversals.

Although some traders use Fosback's NVI and PVI to analyze individual stocks, the indicators were created to track, and have been tested, on major market indexes. NVI was Dysart's most invaluable breadth index, and Fosback found that his version of "the Negative Volume Index is an excellent indicator of the primary market trend". Traders can benefit from both innovations.
