= Marc Chaikin =

Stock analyst

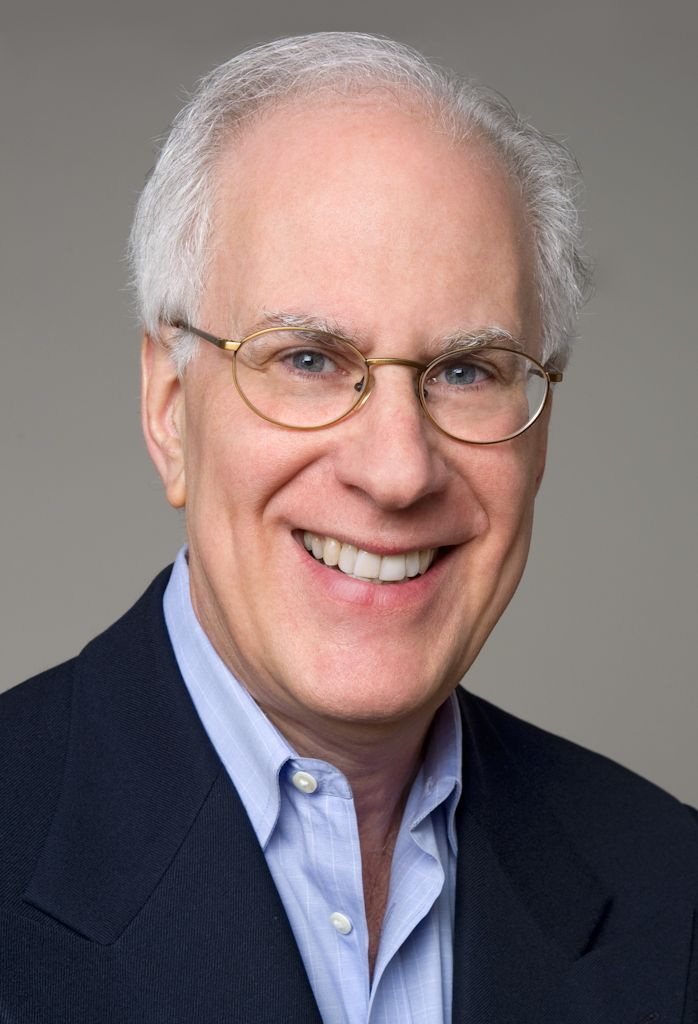
- Occupations: Stock analyst; entrepreneur
- Spouse: Sandy Chaikin

Marc Chaikin is a stock analyst, and founder and CEO of Chaikin Analytics, LLC. He's also the founder of Bomar Securities LP, selling it to Instinet Corp. in 1992. He then went on to become Senior Vice President and Director at Instinet when it was owned by Reuters.com.

== Education and career ==
Marc Chaikin attended Brown University from 1960 to 1964, studying Government and Politics. Chaikin began as a stock broker in 1965. He became head of the options department at Tucker Anthony & R. L. Day in the 1970s. Following his employment there, Chaikin bought a seat on the NYFE, where he traded futures contracts. In 1980 Chaikin began developing proprietary stock market indicators, and in 1982 joined the firm Drexel Burnham Lambert. That year he began hosting a regular segment on the Financial News Network—the original incarnation of CNBC. Later he founded the firm Bomar Securities LP, selling it to Instinet in 1992. Following the sale he was hired as a senior vice-president at the Instinet brokerage house.

Chaikin spent much of his career developing computerized stock selection models for money managers. He is most known for his creation of the first real-time analytics workstation for portfolio managers and other stock traders, proprietary analytics that are currently a key part of the Thomson Reuters institutional workstation. He is especially recognized for his development of the Accumulation/Distribution Line indicator (ADL). Chaikin also developed the Chaikin Volume Accumulator (VAC) indicator. The two major indicators associated with the ADL are the Chaikin Oscillator and the Chaikin Money Flow indicators, both of which have been heavily used on Wall Street since their inceptions.

In the late 2000s, Chaikin started Chaikin Stock Research, in order to provide professional grade stock tools to individual investors. As founder and CEO of Chaikin Stock Research he has appeared on several national news networks including CNBC and Fox Business. In 2011 and 2012 he was noted in the media for his bullish optimism for the Dow Jones Industrial Average and the stock market in general.
