= New York Stock Exchange =

American stock exchange

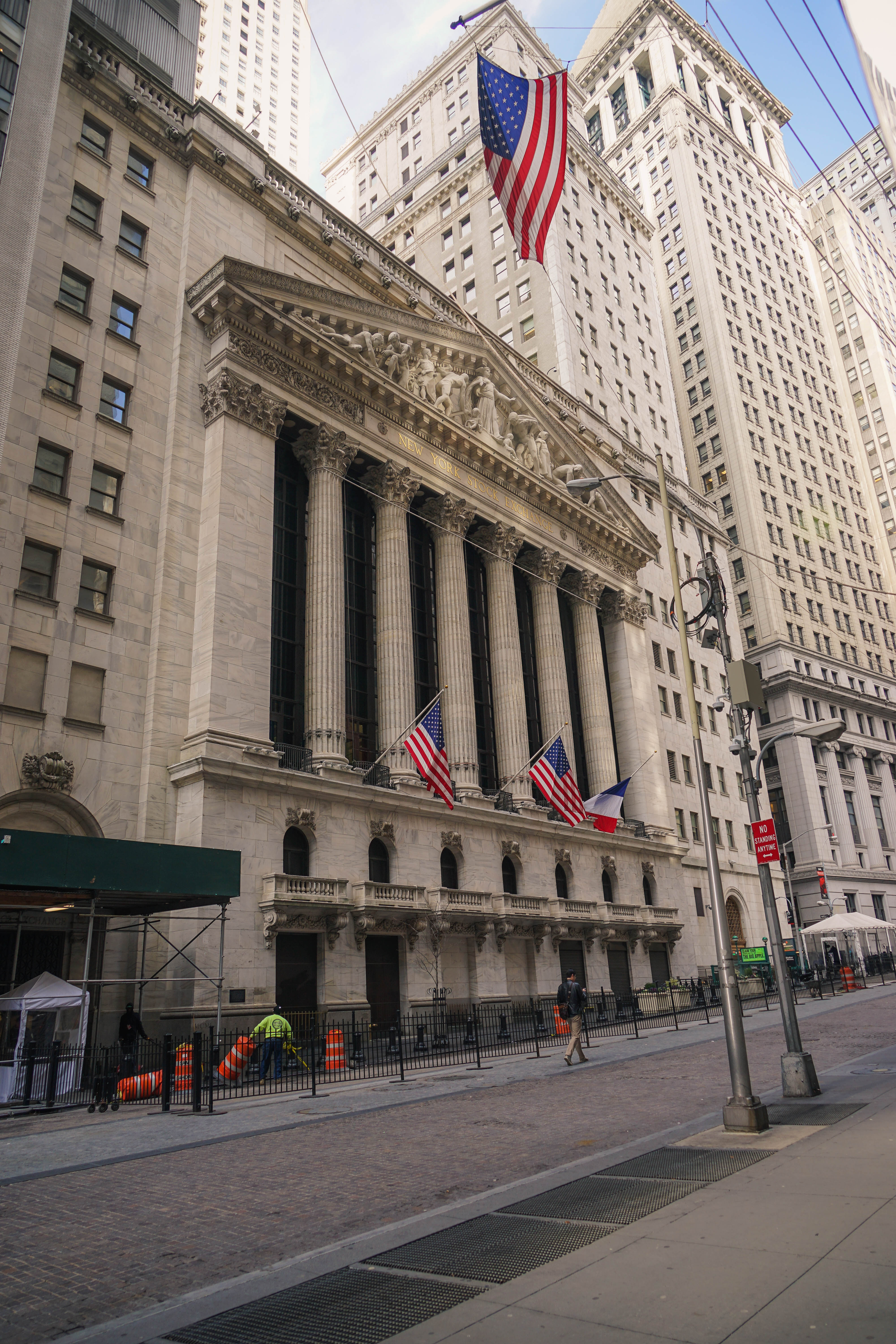
- Type: Stock exchange
- Location: New York City, United States
- Coordinates: 40°42′25″N 74°00′40″W
- Founded: May 17, 1792; 234 years ago
- Owner: Intercontinental Exchange
- Key people: Sharon Bowen (Chair); Lynn Martin (President)
- Currency: United States dollar
- No. of listings: 2,223 (July 2024)
- Market cap: US$44.7 trillion (December 2025)
- Indices: Dow Jones Industrial Average; S&P 500; NYSE Composite
- Website: nyse.com

The New York Stock Exchange (NYSE, nicknamed "the Big Board") is an American stock exchange headquartered at the New York Stock Exchange Building in the Financial District of Lower Manhattan in New York City. It is the second largest stock exchange in the world by market capitalization, exceeding $30 trillion in January 2026. The NYSE is owned by Intercontinental Exchange, an American holding company that it also lists (ticker symbol ICE). Previously, it was part of NYSE Euronext (NYX), which was formed by the NYSE's 2007 merger with Euronext.

== History ==
The earliest recorded organization of securities trading in New York among brokers directly dealing with each other can be traced to the Buttonwood Agreement. Previously, securities exchange had been intermediated by auctioneers who conducted other auctions as well; such as commodities like wheat and tobacco. On May 17, 1792, twenty-four brokers signed the Buttonwood Agreement, which set a floor commission rate charged to clients and bound the signers to give preference to the other signers in securities sales. The earliest securities traded were mostly governmental securities such as War Bonds from the Revolutionary War and First Bank of the United States stock, although Bank of New York stock was a non-governmental security traded in the early days. The Bank of North America, along with the First Bank of the United States and the Bank of New York, were the first shares traded on the New York Stock Exchange.

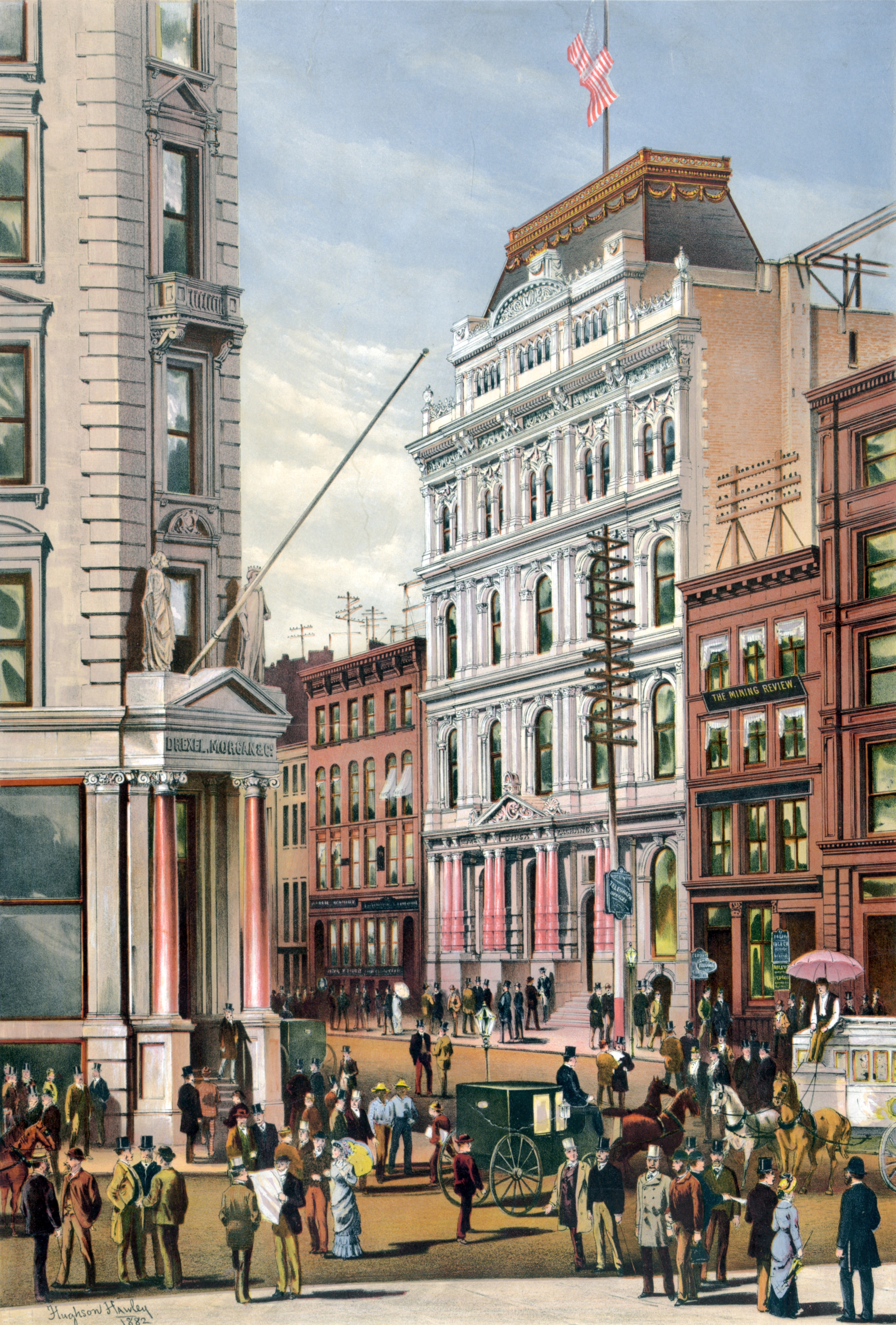
The Stock Exchange at 10–12 Broad Street in 1882.

In 1817, the stockbrokers of New York, operating under the Buttonwood Agreement, instituted new reforms and reorganized. After sending a delegation to Philadelphia to observe the organization of their board of brokers, restrictions on manipulative trading were adopted, as well as formal organs of governance. After re-forming as the New York Stock and Exchange Board, the broker organization began renting out space exclusively for securities trading, which previously had been taking place at the Tontine Coffee House. Several locations were used between 1817 and 1865, when the present location was adopted.

The invention of the electrical telegraph consolidated markets and New York's market rose to dominance over Philadelphia after weathering some market panics better than other alternatives. The Open Board of Stock Brokers was established in 1864 as a competitor to the NYSE. With 354 members, the Open Board of Stock Brokers rivaled the NYSE in membership (which had 533) "because it used a more modern, continuous trading system superior to the NYSE's twice-daily call sessions". The Open Board of Stock Brokers merged with the NYSE in 1869. Robert Wright of Bloomberg writes that the merger increased the NYSE's members as well as trading volume, as "several dozen regional exchanges were also competing with the NYSE for customers. Buyers, sellers and dealers all wanted to complete transactions as quickly and cheaply as technologically possible and that meant finding the markets with the most trading, or the greatest liquidity in today's parlance. Minimizing competition was essential to keep a large number of orders flowing, and the merger helped the NYSE maintain its reputation for providing superior liquidity." The Civil War greatly stimulated speculative securities trading in New York. By 1869, membership had to be capped, and has been sporadically increased since. The latter half of the nineteenth century saw rapid growth in securities trading.

Securities trade in the latter nineteenth and early twentieth centuries was prone to panics and crashes. Government regulation of securities trading was eventually seen as necessary, with arguably the most dramatic changes occurring in the 1930s after a major stock market crash occurred near the beginning of the Great Depression. The NYSE has also imposed additional rules in response to shareholder protection controls, e.g. in 2012, the NYSE imposed rules restricting brokers from voting uninstructed shares.

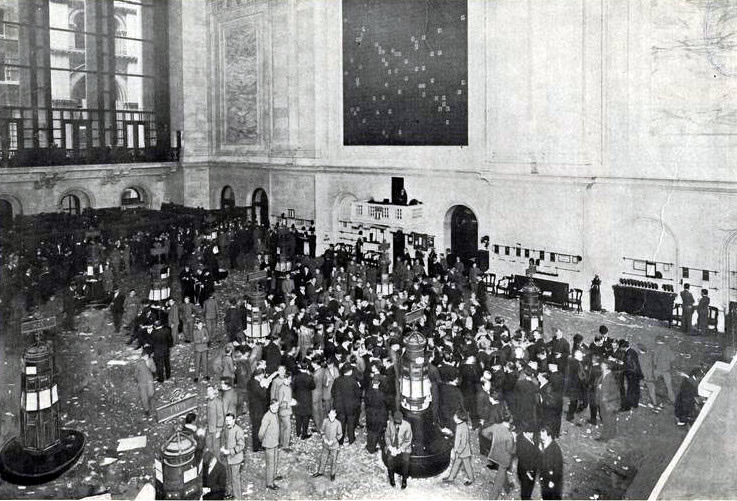
The floor of the New York Stock Exchange in 1908

The Stock Exchange Luncheon Club was situated on the seventh floor from 1898 until its closure in 2006.

On April 21, 2005, the NYSE announced its plans to merge with Archipelago in a deal intended to reorganize the NYSE as a publicly traded company. NYSE's governing board voted to merge with rival Archipelago on December 6, 2005, and became a for-profit, public company. It began trading under the name NYSE Group on March 8, 2006. On April 4, 2007, the NYSE Group completed its merger with Euronext, the European combined stock market, thus forming NYSE Euronext, the first transatlantic stock exchange.

Wall Street is the leading U.S. money center for international financial activities and the foremost U.S. location for the conduct of wholesale financial services. "It comprises a matrix of wholesale financial sectors, financial markets, financial institutions, and financial industry firms" (Robert, 2002). The principal sectors are securities industry, commercial banking, asset management, and insurance.

Prior to the acquisition of NYSE Euronext by the ICE in 2013, Marsh Carter was the Chairman of the NYSE and the CEO was Duncan Niederauer. Currently, the chairman is Jeffrey Sprecher. In 2016, NYSE owner Intercontinental Exchange Inc. earned $419 million in listings-related revenues.

From its opening until August 2000, all stock prices on the New York Stock Exchange were quoted in fractional increments of eighths, based on the 17th century Spanish trading system's practice of using pieces of eight. On August 28, 2000, some stocks were quoted in decimals, and all NYSE stocks were decimalized by the end of 2001.

=== Notable events ===
==== 20th century ====
The exchange was closed shortly after the beginning of World War I (July 31, 1914), but it partially re-opened on November 28 of that year in order to help the war effort by trading bonds, and completely reopened for stock trading on December 12, 1914.

On September 16, 1920, the Wall Street bombing occurred outside the building, killing forty people and injuring hundreds more.

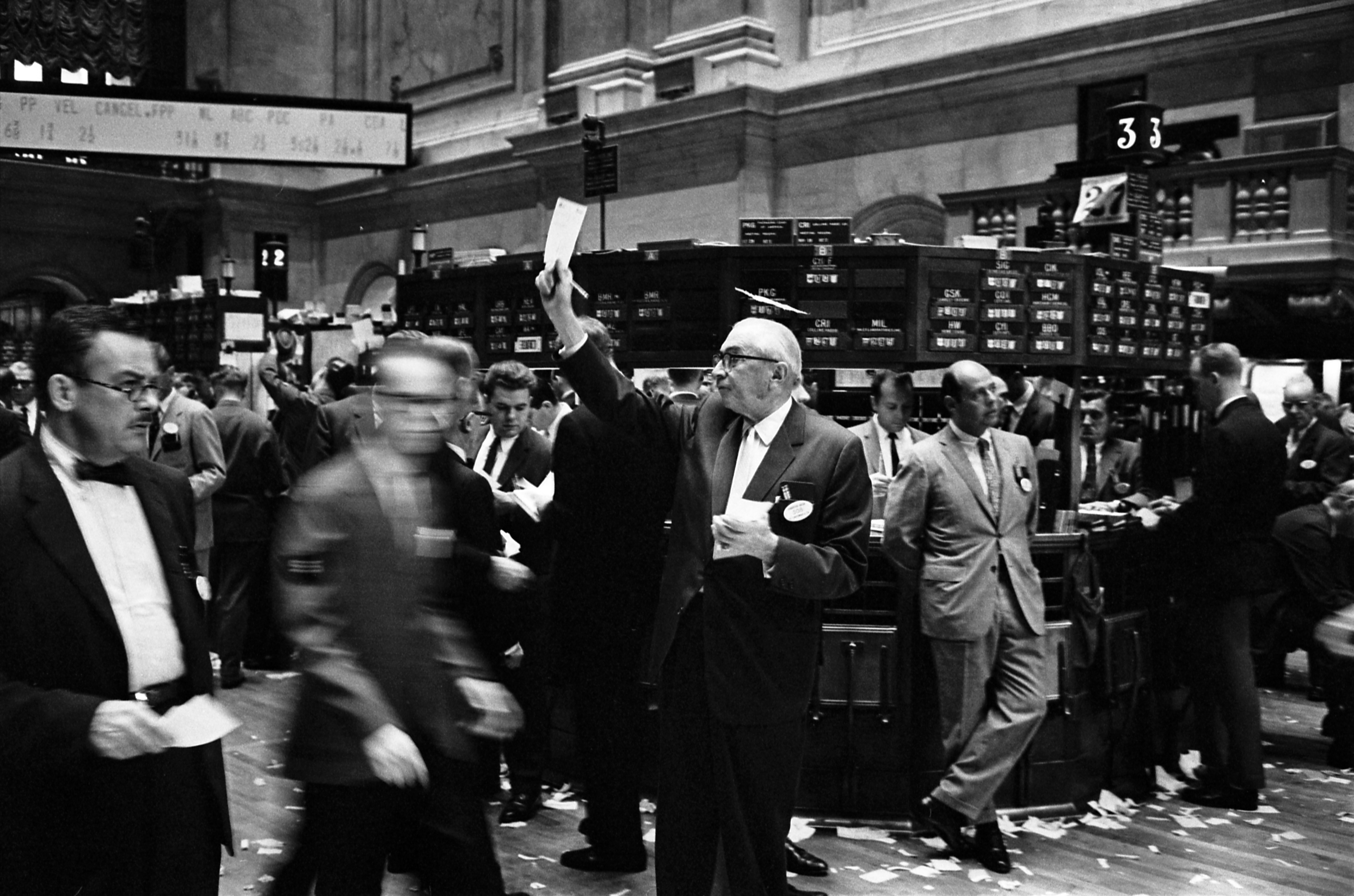
NYSE trade floor in 1963 before the introduction of electronic readouts and computer screens.

The Black Thursday crash of the Exchange on October 24, 1929, and the sell-off panic which started on Black Tuesday, October 29, are often blamed for precipitating the Great Depression. In an effort to restore investor confidence, the Exchange unveiled a fifteen-point program aimed to upgrade protection for the investing public on October 31, 1938.

On October 1, 1934, the exchange was registered as a national securities exchange with the U.S. Securities and Exchange Commission, with a president and a thirty-three-member board. On February 18, 1971, the non-profit corporation was formed, and the number of board members was reduced to twenty-five.

One of Abbie Hoffman's well-known publicity stunts took place in 1967, when he led members of the Yippie movement to the Exchange's gallery. The provocateurs hurled fistfuls of dollars toward the trading floor below. Some traders booed, and some laughed and waved. Three months later the stock exchange enclosed the gallery with bulletproof glass. Hoffman wrote a decade later, "We didn't call the press; at that time we really had no notion of anything called a media event."

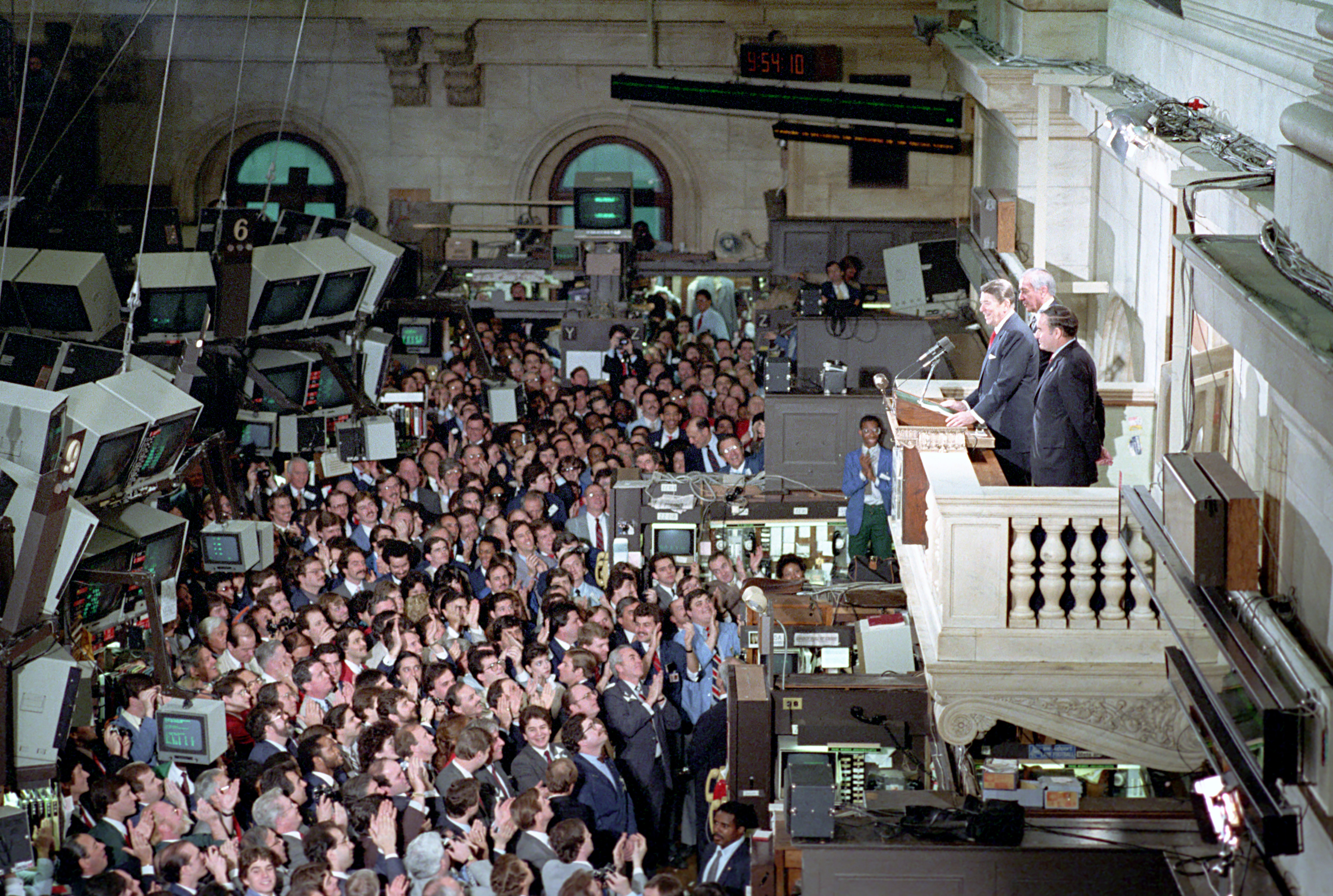
President Ronald Reagan addressing the NYSE in 1985.

On October 19, 1987, the Dow Jones Industrial Average (DJIA) dropped 508 points, a 22.6% loss in a single day, the second-biggest one-day drop the exchange had experienced. Black Monday was followed by Terrible Tuesday, a day in which the Exchange's systems did not perform well and some people had difficulty completing their trades.

Subsequently, there was another major drop for the Dow on October 13, 1989—the Mini-Crash of 1989. The crash was apparently caused by a reaction to a news story of a $6.75 billion leveraged buyout deal for UAL Corporation, the parent company of United Airlines, which broke down. When the UAL deal fell through, it helped trigger the collapse of the junk bond market causing the Dow to fall 190.58 points, or 6.91 percent.

Similarly, there was a panic in the financial world during the year of 1997; the Asian Financial Crisis. Like the fall of many foreign markets, the Dow suffered a 7.18% drop in value (554.26 points) on October 27, 1997, in what later became known as the 1997 Mini-Crash but from which the DJIA recovered quickly. This was the first time that the "circuit breaker" rule had operated.

==== 21st century ====
On January 26, 2000, an altercation during filming of the music video for Rage Against the Machine's "Sleep Now in the Fire", directed by Michael Moore, caused the doors of the exchange to be closed and the band to be escorted from the site by security after the members attempted to gain entry into the exchange.

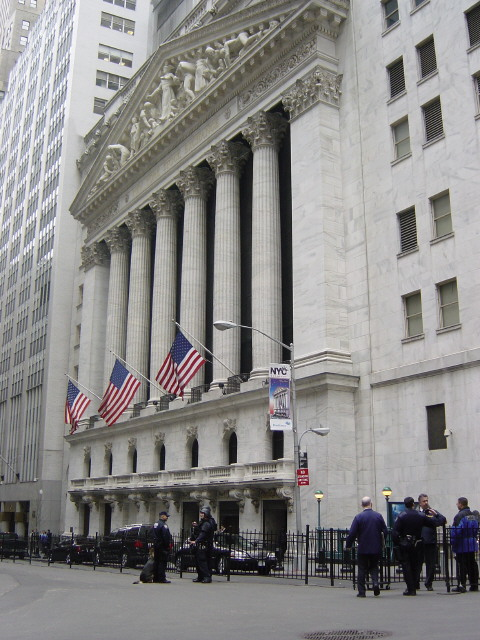
Security after the September 11 attacks

In the aftermath of the September 11 attacks, the NYSE was closed for four trading sessions, resuming on Monday, September 17, one of the rare times the NYSE was closed for more than one session and only the third time since March 1933. On the first day, the NYSE suffered a 7.1% drop in value (684 points); after a week, it dropped by 14% (1,370 points). An estimated $1.4 trillion was lost within five days of trading. The NYSE was only 5 blocks from Ground Zero. The same day it was announced that the exchange and the New York Stock Exchange building would be closed to the general public, a practice that continues to the present day.

On May 6, 2010, the Dow Jones Industrial Average posted its largest intraday percentage drop since the crash on October 19, 1987, with a 998-point loss later being called the 2010 Flash Crash (as the drop occurred for only 36 minutes before rebounding). The SEC and CFTC published a report on the event, although it did not come to a conclusion as to the cause. The regulators found no evidence that the fall was caused by erroneous ("fat finger") orders.

On October 29, 2012, the stock exchange was shut down for two days due to Hurricane Sandy. The last time the stock exchange was closed due to weather for a full two days was on March 12 and 13, 1888.

On May 1, 2014, the stock exchange was fined $4.5 million by the Securities and Exchange Commission to settle charges that it had violated market rules.

On August 14, 2014, Berkshire Hathaway's A Class shares, the highest priced shares on the NYSE, hit $200,000 a share for the first time.

On July 8, 2015, technical issues affected the stock exchange, halting trading at 11:32 am ET. The NYSE reassured stock traders that the outage was "not a result of a cyber breach", and the Department of Homeland Security confirmed that there was "no sign of malicious activity". Trading eventually resumed at 3:10 pm ET the same day.

On May 25, 2018, Stacey Cunningham, the NYSE's chief operating officer, became the Big Board's 67th president, succeeding Thomas Farley. She is the first female leader in the exchange's 226-year history.

In March 2020, the NYSE announced plans to temporarily move to all-electronic trading on March 23, 2020, due to the COVID-19 pandemic. Along with the PHLX and the BSE, the NYSE reopened on May 26, 2020.

== Building ==
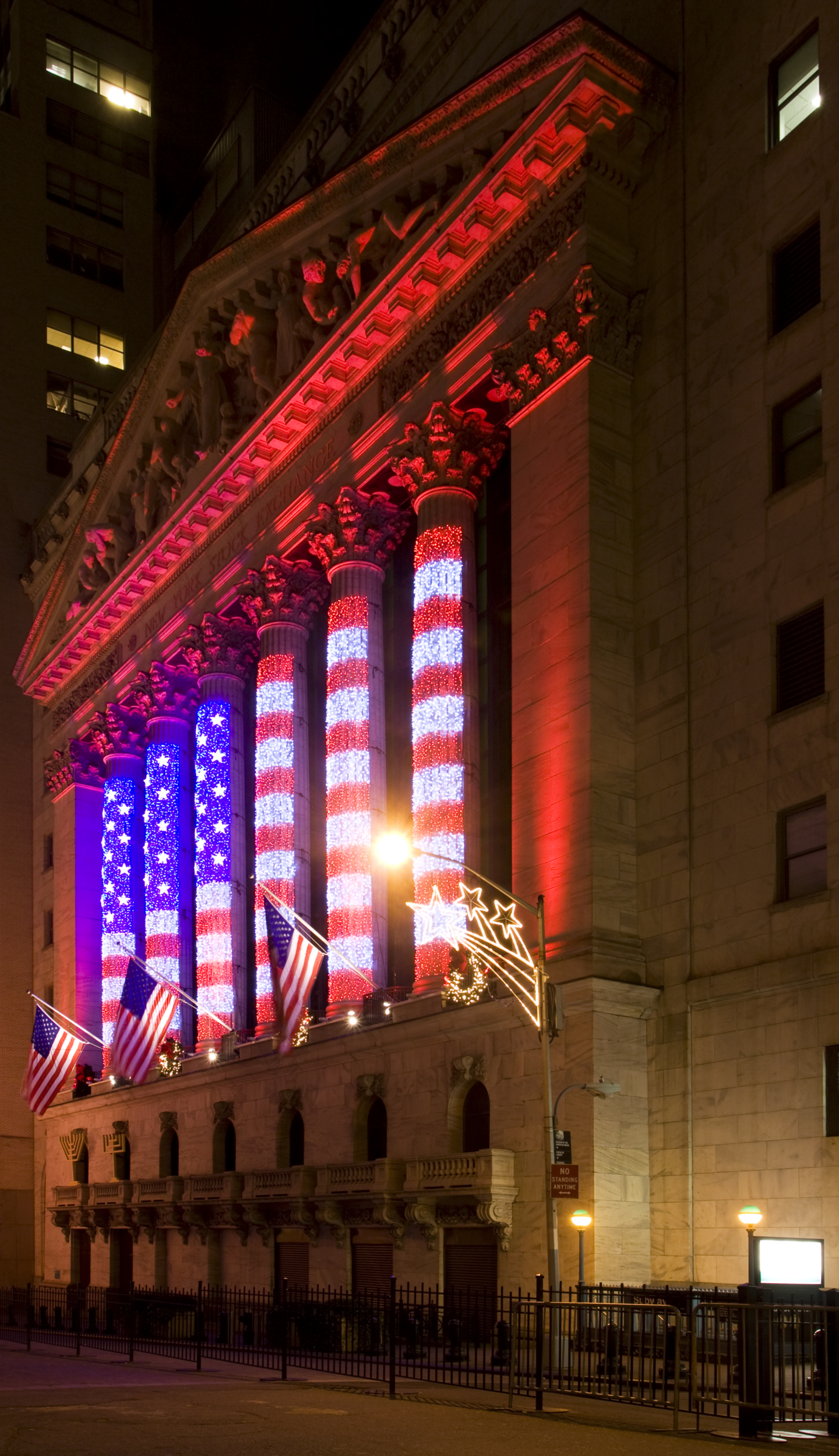
The NYSE Building in December 2008

The main New York Stock Exchange Building, built in 1903, is at 18 Broad Street, between the corners of Wall Street and Exchange Place, and was designed in the Beaux Arts style by George B. Post. The adjacent structure at 11 Wall Street, completed in 1922, was designed in a similar style by Trowbridge & Livingston. The buildings were both designated a National Historic Landmark in 1978. 18 Broad Street is also a New York City designated landmark.

== Official holidays ==
The New York Stock Exchange is closed on New Year's Day, Martin Luther King Jr. Day, Washington's Birthday, Good Friday, Memorial Day, Juneteenth National Independence Day, Independence Day, Labor Day, Thanksgiving, and Christmas. When those holidays occur on a weekend, the holiday is observed on the closest weekday. In addition, the Stock Exchange closes early on the day before Independence Day, the day after Thanksgiving, and Christmas Eve. The NYSE averages about 253 trading days per year.

== Trading ==
The New York Stock Exchange (sometimes referred to as "The Big Board") provides a means for buyers and sellers to trade shares of stock in companies registered for public trading. The NYSE is open for trading Monday through Friday from 9:30 am – 4:00 pm ET, with the exception of holidays declared by the Exchange in advance. (Note: Pre-Opening Session: 2:30 a.m and Opening Session: 4:00 a.m. to 9:30 a.m. ET) Proposals for round-the-clock trading have been considered by NYSE.

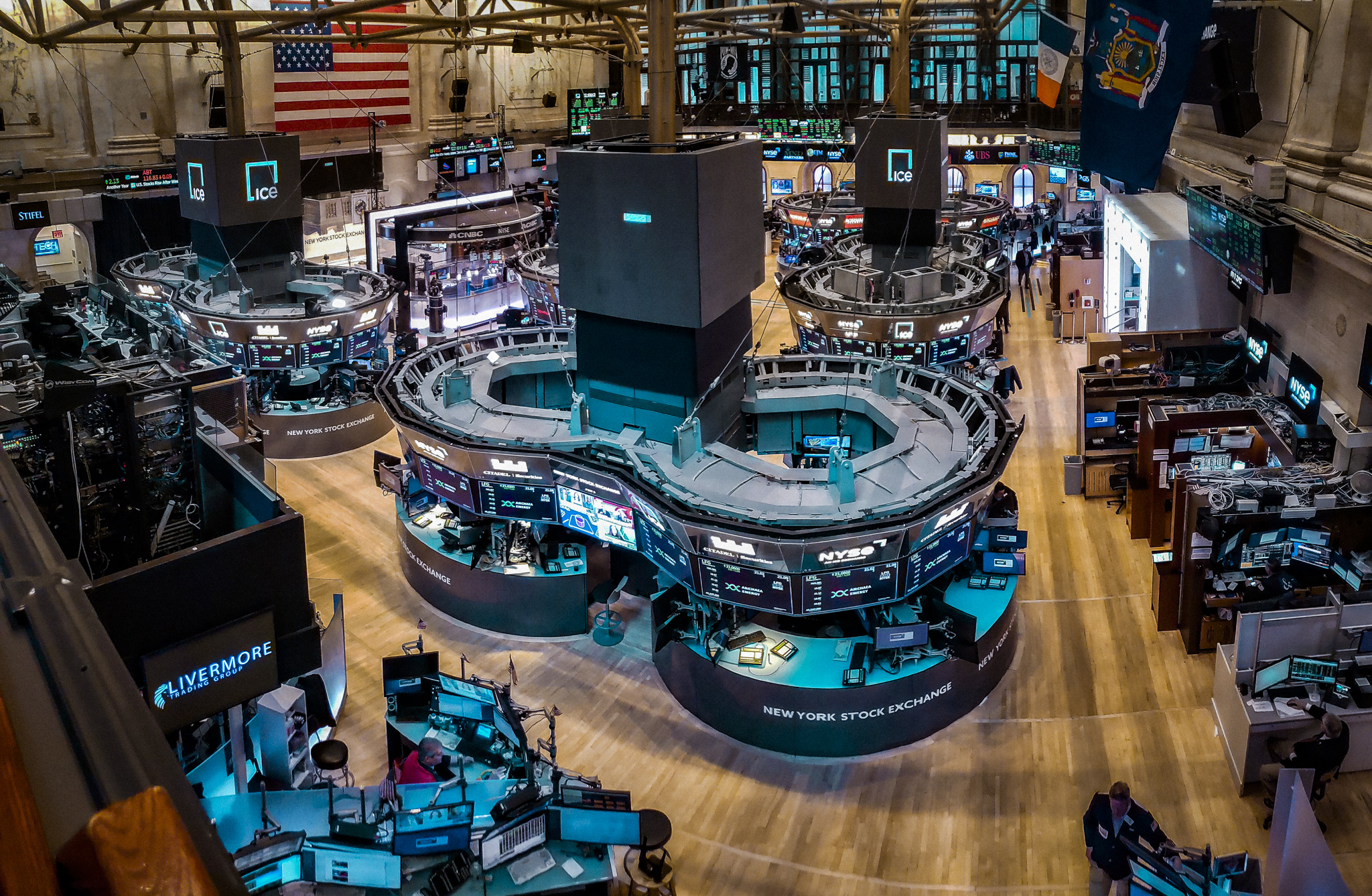
The trading floor of the New York Stock Exchange in March 2022

The NYSE trades in a continuous auction format, where traders can execute stock transactions on behalf of investors. They will gather around the appropriate post where a specialist broker, who is employed by a NYSE member firm (that is, they are not an employee of the New York Stock Exchange), acts as an auctioneer in an open outcry auction market environment to bring buyers and sellers together and to manage the actual auction. They do on occasion (approximately 10% of the time) facilitate the trades by committing their own capital and as a matter of course disseminate information to the crowd that helps to bring buyers and sellers together. The auction process moved toward automation in 1995 through the use of wireless handheld computers (HHC). The system enabled traders to receive and execute orders electronically via wireless transmission. On September 25, 1995, NYSE member Michael Einersen, who designed and developed this system, executed 1000 shares of IBM through this HHC, ending a 203-year process of paper transactions and ushering in an era of automated trading.

As of January 24, 2007, all NYSE stocks can be traded via its electronic hybrid market (except for a small group of very high-priced stocks). Customers can now send orders for immediate electronic execution, or route orders to the floor for trade in the auction market. In the first three months of 2007, in excess of 82% of all order volume was delivered to the floor electronically. NYSE works with US regulators such as the SEC and CFTC to coordinate risk management measures in the electronic trading environment through the implementation of mechanisms like circuit breakers and liquidity replenishment points.

Following the Black Monday market crash in 1987, NYSE imposed trading curbs to reduce market volatility and massive panic sell-offs. Following the 2011 rule change, at the start of each trading day, the NYSE sets three circuit breaker levels at levels of 7% (Level 1), 13% (Level 2), and 20% (Level 3) of the average closing price of the S&P 500 for the preceding trading day. Level 1 and Level 2 declines result in a 15-minute trading halt unless they occur after 3:25 pm, when no trading halts apply. A Level 3 decline results in trading being suspended for the remainder of the day. (The biggest one-day decline in the S&P 500 since 1987 was the 11.98% drop on March 16, 2020.)

=== Floor seats ===
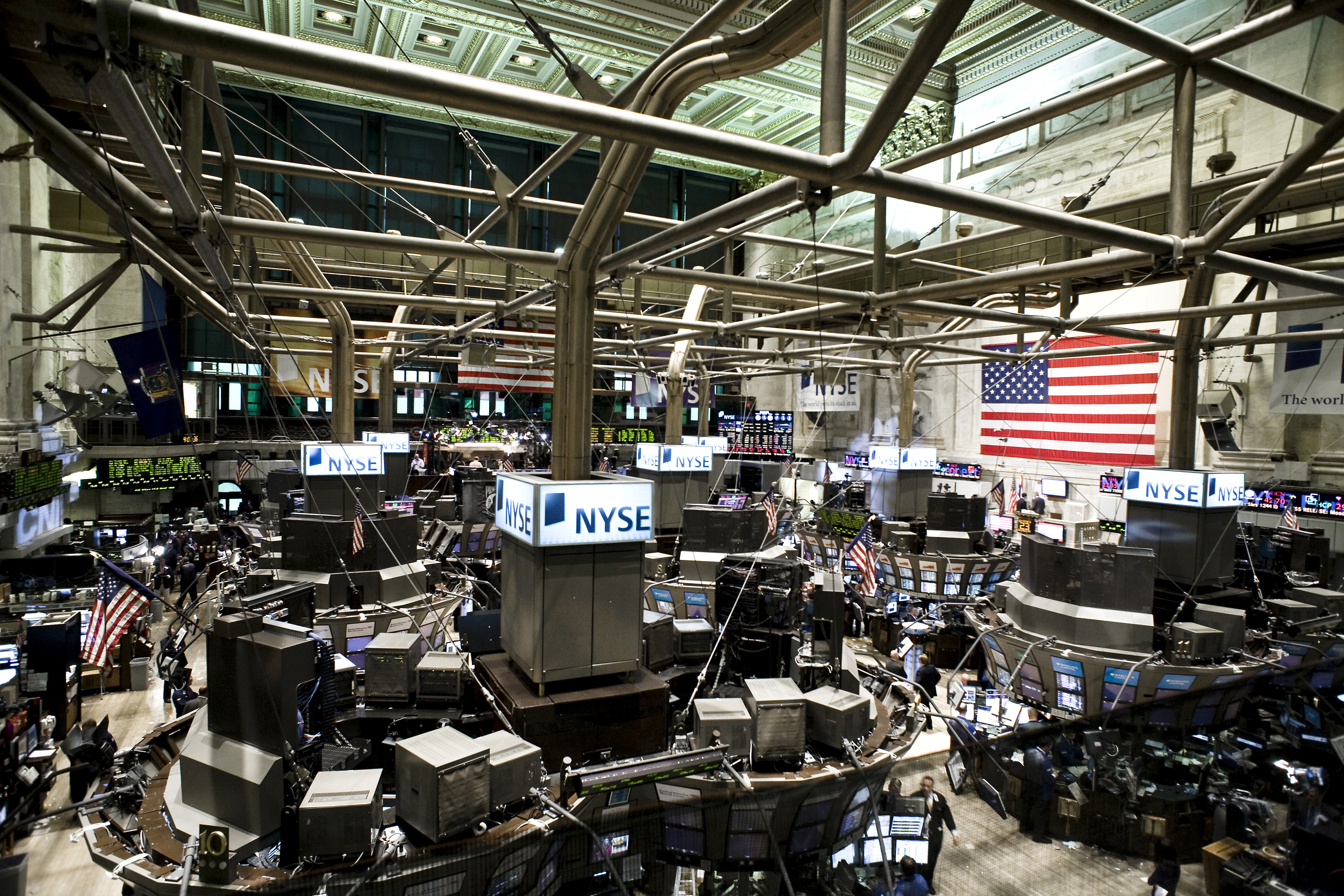
The NYSE trading floor in 2009

Until 2005, the right to directly trade shares on the exchange was conferred upon owners of a limited number of "seats". The term comes from the fact that up until the 1870s NYSE members sat in chairs to trade. In 1868, the number of seats was fixed at 533, and this number was increased several times over the years. In 1953, the number of seats was set permanently at 1,366.

These seats were a sought-after commodity as they conferred the ability to directly trade stock on the NYSE, and seat holders were commonly referred to as members of the NYSE. Seat prices varied widely over the years, generally falling during recessions and rising during economic expansions. In January 1927 the cost of a seat reached a then-record $185,000. The most expensive inflation-adjusted seat was sold in 1929 for $625,000, which, today, would be over six million dollars. In recent times, seats have sold for as high as $4 million in the late 1990s and as low as $1 million in 2001. In 2005, seat prices shot up to $3.25 million as the exchange entered into an agreement to merge with Archipelago and became a for-profit, publicly traded company. Seat owners received $500,000 in cash per seat and 77,000 shares of the newly formed corporation. The NYSE now sells one-year licenses to trade directly on the exchange. Licenses for floor trading are available for $40,000 and a license for bond trading is available for as little as $1,000 as of 2010. Neither are resellable, but may be transferable during a change of ownership of a corporation holding a trading license.

The Barnes family is the only known lineage to have five generations of NYSE members: Winthrop H. Barnes (admitted 1894), Richard W.P. Barnes (admitted 1926), Richard S. Barnes (admitted 1951), Robert H. Barnes (admitted 1972), and Derek J. Barnes (admitted 2003).

=== NYSE Composite Index ===
In the mid-1960s, the NYSE Composite Index (NYSE: NYA) was created, with a base value of 50 points equal to the 1965 yearly close. This was done to reflect the value of all stocks trading at the exchange, in contrast with the then predominant Dow Jones Industrial Average which tracks just 30 stocks. To raise the profile of the composite index, in 2003, the NYSE set its new base value of 5,000 points equal to the 2002 yearly close. Its close at the end of 2013 was 10,400.32.

=== Timeline ===
- In 1792, NYSE acquires its first traded securities.
- In 1817, the constitution of the New York Stock and Exchange Board is adopted. It had also been established by the New York brokers as a formal organization.
- In 1824, the New-York Gas Light Company was listed on the NYSE. Now Consolidated Edison, it is the longest continually listed company on the Exchange.
- In 1863, the name changed to the New York Stock Exchange.
- In 1865, the New York Gold Exchange was acquired by the NYSE.
- In 1867, stock tickers were first introduced.
- In 1885, the 400 NYSE members in the Consolidated Stock Exchange withdraw from Consolidated over disagreements on exchange trade areas.
- In 1896, the Dow Jones Industrial Average (DJIA) is first published in The Wall Street Journal.
- In 1903, the NYSE moves into new quarters at 18 Broad Street.
- In 1906, the DJIA exceeds 100 on January 12.
- In 1907, the Panic of 1907 occurred.
- In 1909, trading in bonds begins.
- In 1915, basis of quoting and trading in stocks changes from percent of par value to dollars.
- In 1920, a bomb exploded on Wall Street outside the NYSE building. Thirty-eight killed and hundreds injured.
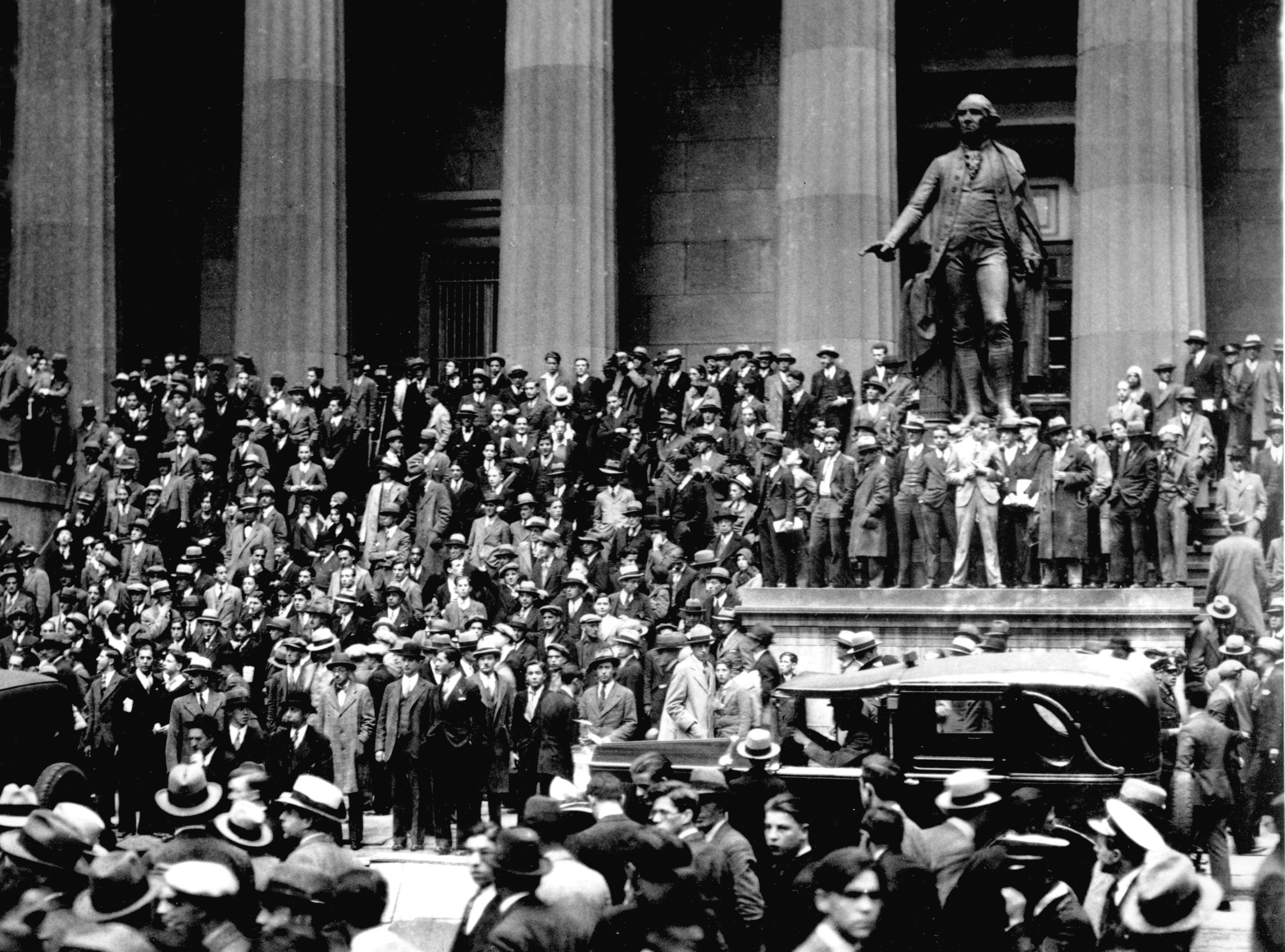
  Crowds gathering outside the New York Stock Exchange on "Black Thursday", October 24, 1929
- In 1923, Poor's Publishing introduced their "Composite Index", today referred to as the S&P 500, which tracked a small number of companies on the NYSE.
- In 1929, the central quote system was established; Black Thursday, October 24 and Black Tuesday, October 29 signal the end of the Roaring Twenties bull market.
- In 1938, NYSE names its first president.
- In 1943, the trading floor is opened to women while men were serving in WWII.
- In 1949, the third longest (eight-year) bull market begins.
- In 1952, Saturday trading hours are eliminated, establishing the five-day trading week.
- In 1954, the DJIA surpasses its 1929 peak in inflation-adjusted dollars.
- In 1956, the DJIA closes above 500 for the first time on March 12.
- In 1957, after Poor's Publishing merged with the Standard Statistics Bureau, the Standard & Poors composite index grew to track 500 companies on the NYSE, becoming known as the S&P 500.
- In 1966, NYSE begins a composite index of all listed common stocks. This is referred to as the "Common Stock Index" and is transmitted daily. The starting point of the index is 50. It is later renamed the NYSE Composite Index.
- In 1967, Muriel Siebert becomes the first female member of the New York Stock Exchange.
- In 1967, protesters led by Abbie Hoffman throw mostly fake dollar bills at traders from gallery, leading to the installation of bullet-proof glass.
- In 1970, the Securities Investor Protection Corporation was established.
- In 1971, NYSE incorporated and recognized as Not-for-Profit organization.
- In 1971, the NASDAQ was founded and competes with the NYSE as the world's first electronic stock market. To date, the NASDAQ is the second-largest exchange in the world by market capitalization, behind only the NYSE.
- In 1972, the DJIA closes above 1,000 for the first time on November 14.
- In 1977, foreign brokers are first admitted to NYSE.
- In 1980, the New York Futures Exchange was established.
- In 1987, Black Monday, October 19, sees the second-largest one-day DJIA percentage drop (22.6%, or 508 points) in history.
- In 1987, membership in the NYSE reaches a record price of $1.5 million.
- In 1989, on September 14, seven members of ACT-UP, The AIDS Coalition to Unleash Power, entered the NYSE and protested by chaining themselves to the balcony overlooking the trading floor and unfurling a banner, "SELL WELCOME", in reference to drug manufacturer Burroughs Wellcome. Following the protest, Burroughs Wellcome reduced the price of AZT (a drug used by people living with HIV and AIDS) by over 30%.
- In 1990, the longest (ten-year) bull market begins.
- In 1991, the DJIA exceeds 3,000.
- In 1995, the DJIA exceeds 5,000.
- In 1996, a real-time ticker was introduced.
- In 1997, on October 27, a sell-off in Asia's stock markets hurts the U.S. markets as well; DJIA sees the largest one-day point drop of 554 (or 7.18%) in history.
- In 1999, the DJIA exceeds 10,000 on March 29.
- In 2000, the DJIA peaks at 11,722.98 on January 14; the first NYSE global index is launched under the ticker NYIID.
- In 2001, trading in fractions (n/16) ends, replaced by decimals (increments of $0.01, see Decimalization); September 11 attacks occur causing NYSE to close for four sessions.
- In 2003, NYSE Composite Index relaunched and value set equal to 5,000 points.
- In 2006, NYSE and ArcaEx merge, creating NYSE Arca and forming the publicly owned, for-profit NYSE Group, Inc.; in turn, NYSE Group merges with Euronext, creating the first trans-Atlantic stock exchange group; DJIA tops 12,000 on October 19.
- In 2007, US President George W. Bush shows up unannounced to the floor about an hour and a half before a Federal Open Market Committee interest-rate decision on January 31; NYSE announces its merger with the American Stock Exchange; NYSE Composite closes above 10,000 on June 1; DJIA exceeds 14,000 on July 19 and closes at a peak of 14,164.53 on October 9.
- In 2008, the DJIA loses more than 500 points on September 15 amid fears of bank failures, resulting in a permanent prohibition of naked short selling and a three-week temporary ban on all short selling of financial stocks; in spite of this, record volatility continues for the next two months, culminating at 5 1/2-year market lows.
- In 2009, the second longest and current bull market begins on March 9 after the DJIA closes at 6,547.05 reaching a 12-year low; DJIA returns to 10,015.86 on October 14.
- In 2013, the DJIA closes above 2007 highs on March 5; DJIA closes above 16,500 to end the year.
- In 2014, the DJIA closes above 17,000 on July 3 and above 18,000 on December 23.
- In 2015, the DJIA achieved an all-time high of 18,351.36 on May 19.
- In 2015, the DJIA dropped over 1,000 points to 15,370.33 soon after open on August 24, 2015, before bouncing back and closing at 15,795.72, a drop of over 669 points.
- In 2016, the DJIA hits an all-time high of 18,873.6.
- In 2017, the DJIA reaches 20,000 for the first time (on January 25).
- In 2018, the DJIA reaches 25,000 for the first time (on January 4). On February 5, the DJIA dropped 1,175 points, the largest point drop in history.
- In 2020, the NYSE temporarily transitioned to electronic trading due to the COVID-19 pandemic.

=== Merger, acquisition, and control ===
In October 2008, NYSE Euronext completed acquisition of the American Stock Exchange (AMEX) for $260 million in stock.

On February 15, 2011, NYSE and Deutsche Börse announced their merger to form a new company, as yet unnamed, wherein Deutsche Börse shareholders would have 60% ownership of the new entity, and NYSE Euronext shareholders would have 40%.

On February 1, 2012, the European Commission blocked the merger of NYSE with Deutsche Börse, after commissioner Joaquín Almunia stated that the merger "would have led to a near-monopoly in European financial derivatives worldwide". Instead, Deutsche Börse and NYSE would have to sell either their Eurex derivatives or LIFFE shares in order to not create a monopoly. On February 2, 2012, NYSE Euronext and Deutsche Börse agreed to scrap the merger.

In April 2011, Intercontinental Exchange (ICE), an American futures exchange, and NASDAQ OMX Group had together made an unsolicited proposal to buy NYSE Euronext for approximately $11 billion, a deal in which NASDAQ would have taken control of the stock exchanges. NYSE Euronext rejected this offer twice, and it was finally terminated after the United States Department of Justice indicated their intention to block the deal due to antitrust concerns.

In December 2012, ICE proposed to buy NYSE Euronext in a stock swap with a valuation of $8 billion. NYSE Euronext shareholders would receive either $33.12 in cash, or $11.27 in cash and approximately a sixth of a share of ICE. Jeffrey Sprecher, the chairman and CEO of ICE, would retain those positions, but four members of the NYSE board of directors would be added to the ICE board.

On January 24, 2023, a glitch in NYSE caused panic because unintentional trade orders were opened and closed in more than 250 securities.

== Opening and closing bells ==
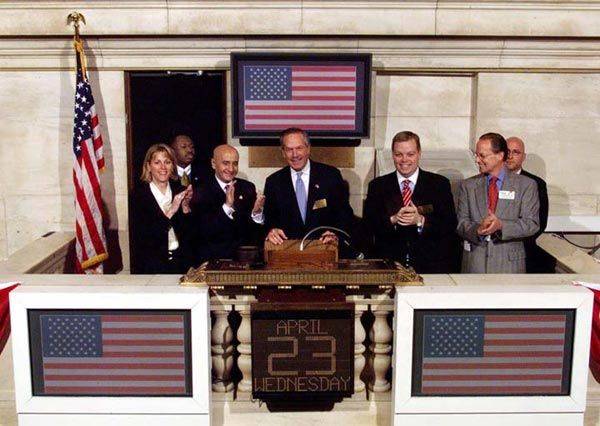
U.S. Secretary of Commerce Donald L. Evans rings the opening bell at the NYSE on April 23, 2003. Former chairman Richard Grasso is also in this picture.

The NYSE's opening and closing bells mark the beginning and the end of each trading day. The opening bell is rung at 9:30 am ET to mark the start of the day's trading session. At 4 pm ET the closing bell is rung and trading for the day stops. There are bells located in each of the four main sections of the NYSE that all ring at the same time once a button is pressed. There are three buttons that control the bells, located on the control panel behind the podium which overlooks the trading floor. The main bell, which is rung at the beginning and end of the trading day, is controlled by a green button. The second button, colored orange, activates a single-stroke bell that is used to signal a moment of silence. A third, red button controls a backup bell which is used in case the main bell fails to ring.

The ringing of the bells is usually accompanied with applause and is often done by VIPs and celebrities (see pictures and the section "Notable bell-ringers").

=== History ===
The signal to start and stop trading was not always a bell; a gavel was the original signal, which is still utilized alongside the bell. However, the gavel is frequently damaged. During the late 1800s, the NYSE decided to switch the gavel for a gong to signal the day's beginning and end. After the NYSE changed to its present location at 18 Broad Street in 1903, the gong was switched to the bell format that is currently being used. The bell itself was produced by Bevin Brothers in East Hampton, Connecticut, which is known colloquially as "Bell Town" for its history of bell foundries and metal toy manufacturing.

A common sight today is the highly publicized events in which a celebrity or executive from a corporation stands behind the NYSE podium and pushes the button that signals the bells to ring. Due to the amount of coverage that the opening/closing bells receive, many companies coordinate new product launches and other marketing-related events to start on the same day as when the company's representatives ring the bell. It was only in 1995 that the NYSE began having special guests ring the bells on a regular basis; prior to that, ringing the bells was usually the responsibility of the exchange's floor managers.

=== Notable bell-ringers ===
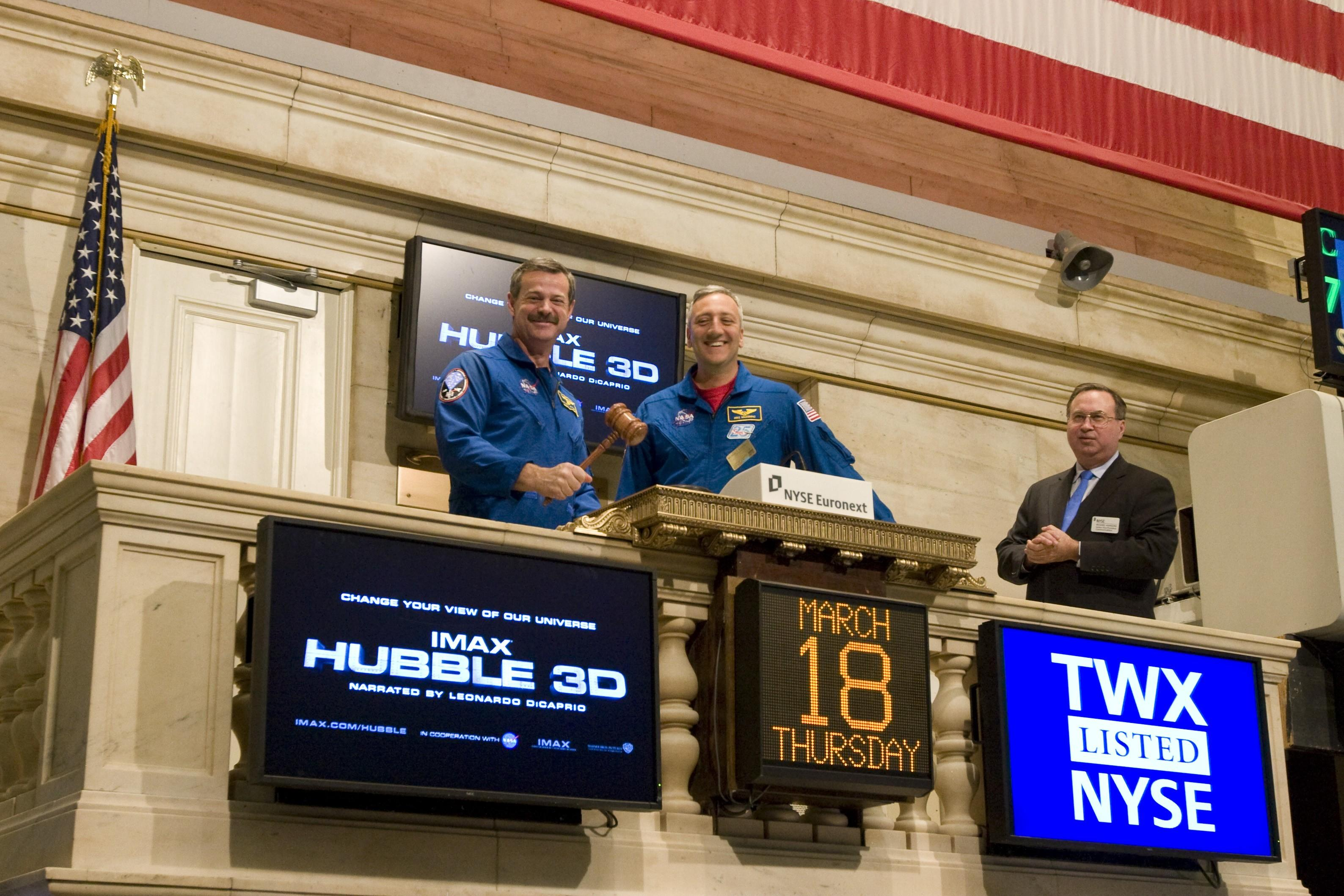
NASA astronauts Scott Altman and Mike Massimino (representing Time Warner, parent company of Warner Bros. Pictures, distributor of the 2010 documentary Hubble) wields the gavel for the 'closing bell'.

Many of the people who ring the bell are business executives whose companies trade on the exchange, usually to announce new products, acquisitions, mergers or public offerings. However, there have also been many famous people from outside the world of business that have rung the bell, such as the Mayor of New York City Rudy Giuliani and the President of South Africa Nelson Mandela. Two United Nations Secretaries General have also rung the bell. On April 27, 2006, Secretary-General Kofi Annan rang the opening bell to launch the United Nations Principles for Responsible Investment. On July 24, 2013, Secretary-General Ban Ki-moon rang the closing bell to celebrate the NYSE joining the United Nations Sustainable Stock Exchanges Initiative. President-Elect Donald Trump rang the bell on December 12, 2024, after being named the Time Person of the Year.

Celebrities that have rung the bell include athletes such as Joe DiMaggio of the New York Yankees and Olympic swimming champion Michael Phelps, entertainers such as rapper Snoop Dogg, members of ESPN's College GameDay crew, singer and actress Liza Minnelli, members of the rock band Kiss, and the members of Rain: A Tribute to The Beatles.

In addition there have been many bell-ringers selected for their public contributions, such as members of the New York City Police Department and New York City Fire Department following the September 11 attacks, members of the United States Armed Forces serving overseas, and participants in various charitable organizations.

Several fictional characters, like mascots of companies and characters from movies and television or toys made by companies listed on the exchange, have rung the bell as well, including Mickey Mouse, the Pink Panther, Mr. Potato Head, the Aflac Duck, Gene and Jailbreak of The Emoji Movie, and Darth Vader.

== See also ==
- Aftermath of the September 11 attacks
- Economy of New York City
- Economy of the United States
- List of American Exchanges
- List of stock exchange mergers in the Americas
- List of presidents of the New York Stock Exchange
- List of stock exchange trading hours
- Rule 48
- Series 14 exam
- Trading day
- U.S. Securities and Exchange Commission
- List of stock exchanges in the Americas
- List of stock market crashes and bear markets
