= NUI =

NUI as an acronym may refer to:

- National University of Ireland
- Natural User Interface
- Normally unmanned installation

Nui may refer to:

- Nui (atoll), a group of islands in Tuvalu
  - Nui (football club)
- Nui, Iran, a village in West Azerbaijan Province
- Nui Harime, a character in the Japanese anime series Kill La Kill

== See also ==
- Niue, a South Pacific island nation
