= Nuy =

Nuy نوي
- Village
- Location within Iran
- Coordinates: 37°13′05″N 44°52′20″E
- Country: Iran
- Province: West Azerbaijan
- County: Urmia
- Bakhsh: Silvaneh
- Rural District: Margavar

Population (2006)
  - Total: 610
- Time zone: UTC+3:30 (IRST)
  - Summer (DST): UTC+4:30 (IRDT)

Nuy (Persian: نوي, also Romanized as Nūy; also known as Nū'ī) is a village in Margavar Rural District, Silvaneh District, Urmia County, West Azerbaijan Province, Iran. At the 2006 census, its population was 610, in 104 families.
