= Julie Chaiken =

American fashion designer

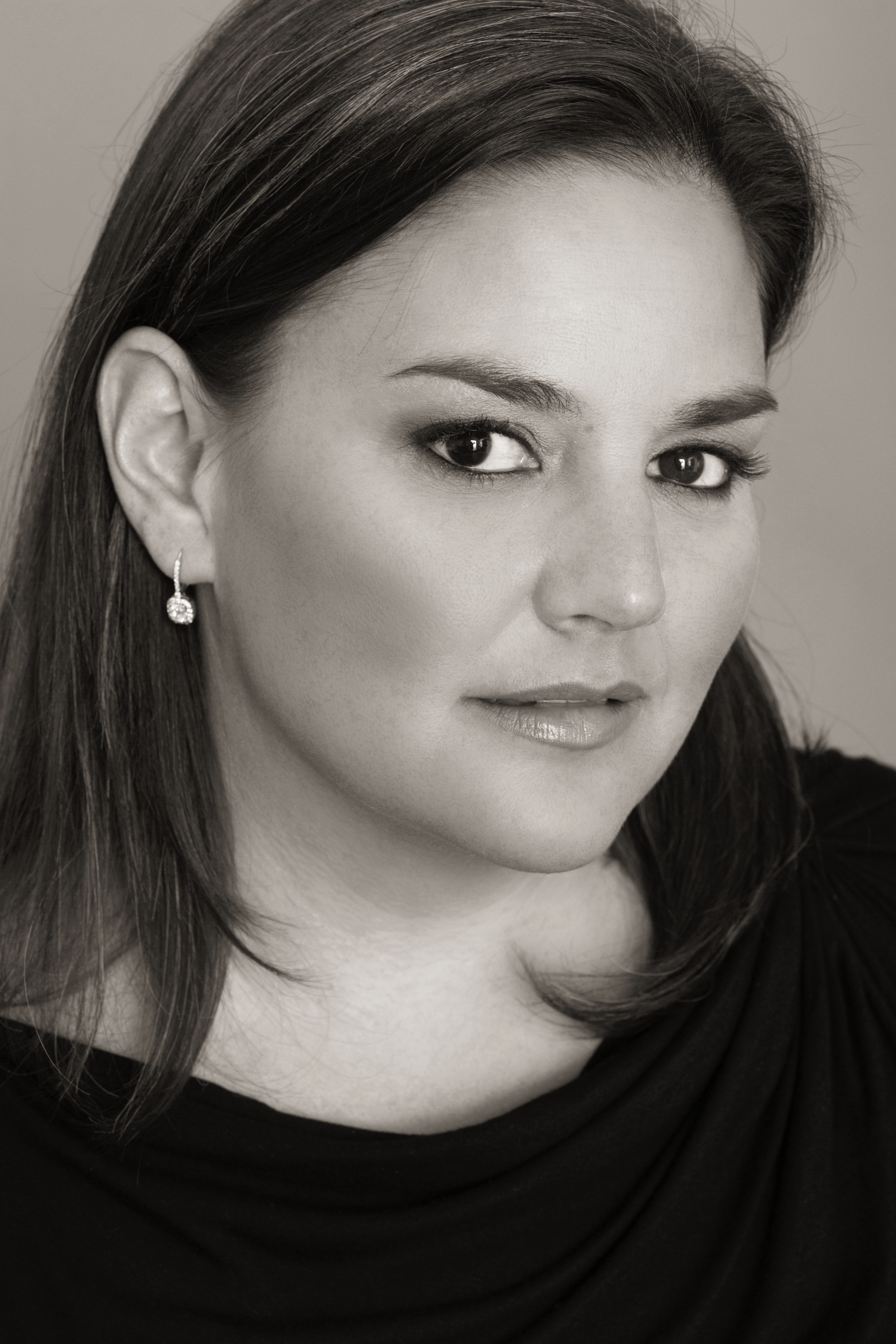
- Born: Detroit, Michigan, United States
- Education: University of California, Los Angeles; New York University Stern School of Business
- Occupation: Entrepreneur

Julie Chaiken is an American entrepreneur and fashion designer. She is best known as the founder of Chaiken, a San Francisco-based clothing line.

== Early life and education ==
Chaiken, who was born in Detroit, grew up in Northern California, the daughter of Carole Chaiken, who raced, bred, and trained horses, and Donald Chaiken, a real estate developer. She attended high school in Lafayette, California, and received a BA in history from the University of California, Los Angeles, in 1989.

Her interest in entertainment prompted Chaiken to move to New York City following graduation; she worked in the original programming department at the USA Network before deciding to pursue an MBA. Enrolling at the New York University Stern School of Business, Chaiken earned an MBA in corporate finance in 1993.

== Career ==
In 1994, recognizing the then-limited clothing options available to fashion-forward women, Chaiken teamed with a friend, Pamela Capone, to found Chaiken and Capone. Chaiken and Capone's first offering included a successful line of pants, which were described as "revolutionizing the pants market."

Initially, Capone focused on design while Chaiken focused on the business and business strategy. In 1998, she bought out Capone; by 1999, the line was being carried in more than 400 boutiques and high-end retailers, including Barneys New York, Saks Fifth Avenue, and Nordstrom. Chaiken, while primarily focused on growing the company, subsequently expanded her role as CEO to include clothing and accessory design.

In 2001, at the request of Chaiken clients including Cindy Crawford and Vendela, Chaiken created a maternity line, Chaiken With Child. Chaiken and Capone's signature pants, with elastic in the waistband, and an "emphatic lack of ugly front pouches," were successful and orders at high-end department mandated wide production. The Chaiken with Child spring collection in 2012 represented 15% of Chaiken and Capone's overall sales.

In 2008, Chaiken—a single mother of two—went on a two-year hiatus. Returning to the company in 2010, she reconfigured her late-1990s dress line Anonymity to include all categories and relaunched it through QVC. A ready-to-wear collection returned to the market in 2010 and, although successfully relaunched as Chaiken and Capone, the company became known as simply Chaiken in 2012.

In 2014, she was honored as a "Woman to Watch" by Jewish Women International.

In 2015, she retired from fashion to focus on her family and her philanthropic work.

== Philanthropy ==
Chaiken served eight years on the board of directors for the Center for Reproductive Rights, an international non-profit organization which uses the law to advance reproductive freedom as a fundamental human right that all governments are legally obligated to protect, respect, and fulfill. Chaiken is also on the board of The Chaiken Family Foundation. She is currently the Leadership Council Co-Chair for Planned Parenthood Federation of America.

She is a founding board member of The Weekend To Be Named Later, which she co-organized with Nancy Lublin, the founder of Dress for Success. LinkedIn's Reid Hoffman, also a co-organizer, describes the event as a "Franklin-inspired gathering of ambitious friends, to brainstorm ways to change the world."

== Personal life ==
Although frequently in New York, Chaiken lives in Marin County in Northern California. She has two children.
