= NYSE Composite =

Stock market index

The NYSE Composite is a stock market index covering all common stock listed on the New York Stock Exchange, including American depositary receipts, real estate investment trusts, tracking stocks, and foreign listings. It includes corporations in each of the ten industries listed in the Industry Classification Benchmark. It uses free-float market cap weighting.

Over 2,000 stocks are covered in the index, of which over 1,600 are from United States corporations and over 360 are foreign listings; however foreign companies are very prevalent among the largest companies in the index: of the 100 companies in the index having the largest market capitalization (and thus the largest impact on the index), more than half (55) are non-U.S. issues.

The index was originally given a value of 50 points, based on the market closing on December 31, 1965, and is weighted by the number of shares listed for each issue. It was re-introduced in January 2003 with a value of 5,000 points. The NYSE Composite outperformed the Dow Jones Industrial Average, the Nasdaq Composite, and the S&P 500 in 2004, 2005, and 2006 and closed above the 10,000 level for the first time on June 1, 2007. The NYSE Composite set a closing high of 10,311.61 on October 31, 2007, but failed to pass the intra-day high of 10,387.17 it reached in trading on October 11, 2007. On September 29, 2008, continuing troubles in the financial sector culminated in a loss of more than 8%. On November 20, 2008, the index plummeted below 5,000 to a multi-year bear market low near 4,650. Its lifetime low (as currently calculated) stands at 347.77 points, reached in October 1974.

After a gradual and volatile recovery since 2009, the index finally set fresh nominal records at the end of 2013, closing at an all-time high of 10,406.77 on December 31.

In addition to the overall composite, there are separate indices for industrial, transportation, utility, and financial corporations.

== Record values ==
Category	All-time highs	
Closing	24,075.12	Monday, July 6, 2026
Intraday	24,159.60	Tuesday, July 7, 2026

== Annual returns ==
Year	Index at year end	Change in index
1999	6,876.10	9.15%
2000	6,945.57	1.01%
2001	6,236.39	−10.21%
2002	5,000.00	−19.83%
2003	6,440.30	28.81%
2004	7,250.06	12.57%
2005	7,753.95	6.95%
2006	9,139.02	17.86%
2007	9,740.32	6.58%
2008	5,757.05	−40.89%
2009	7,184.96	24.80%
2010	7,964.02	10.84%
2011	7,477.03	−6.11%
2012	8,443.51	12.93%
2013	10,400.33	23.18%
2014	10,839.24	4.22%
2015	10,143.42	−6.42%
2016	11,056.90	9.01%
2017	12,808.84	15.84%
2018	11,374.39	−11.20%
2019	13,913.03	22.32%
2020	14,524.80	4.40%
2021	17,164.13	18.17%
2022	15,184.31	−11.53%
2023	16,852.89	10.99%
2024	19,097.10	13.32%
2025	22,003.93	15.22%

== See also ==
- Nasdaq Composite
- Value Line Composite Index
