= Francis Guy =

British-American painter

- Born: c. 1760; London, England
- Died: 1820; Brooklyn, New York City
- Occupation: Painter

Francis Guy (c. 1760–1820) was an English-born American painter. Mostly remembered for his topographic views of Brooklyn, Guy is today highly regarded as one of America's earliest and most important landscape artists.

== Biography ==
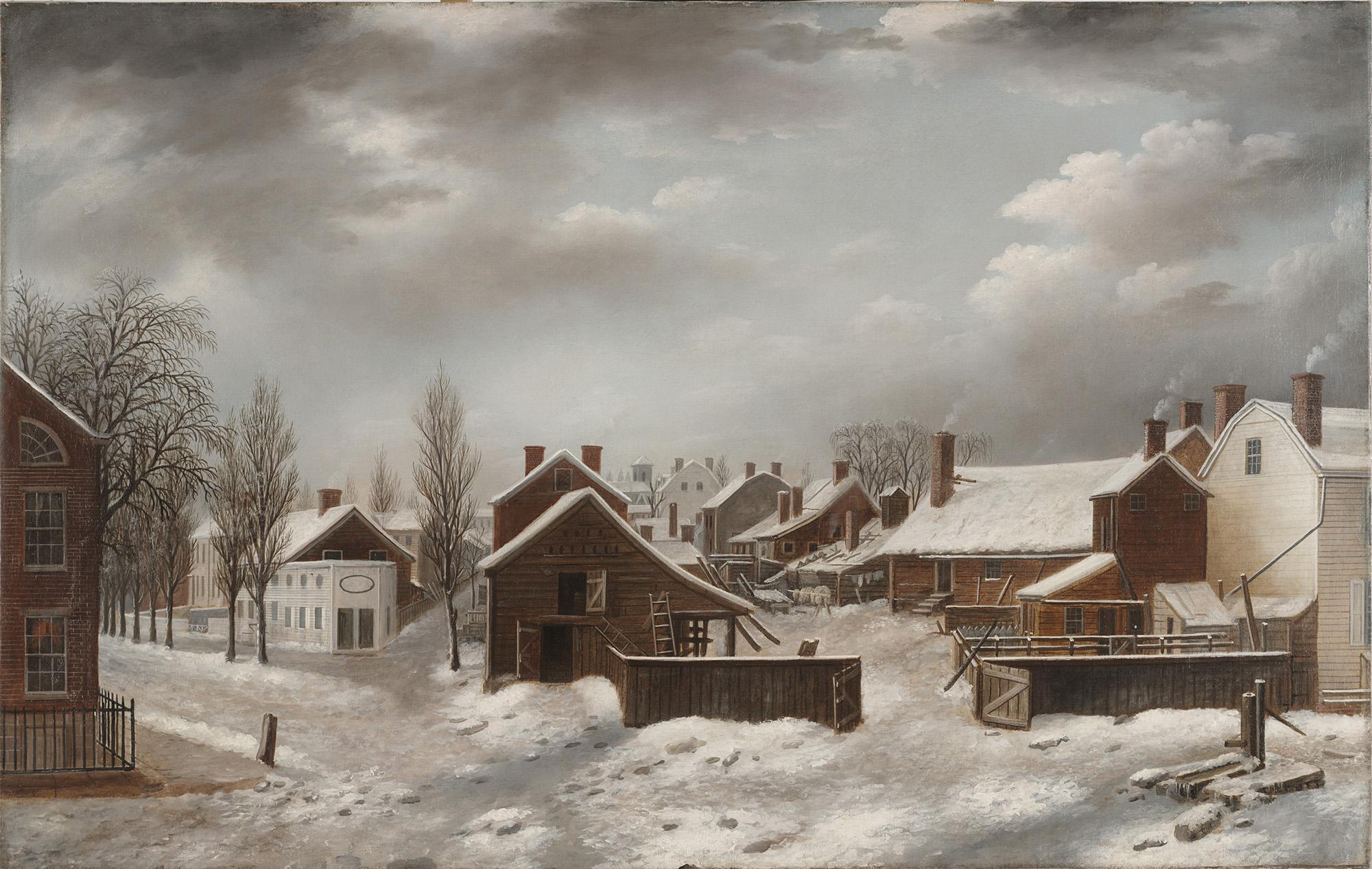
Winter Scene in Brooklyn

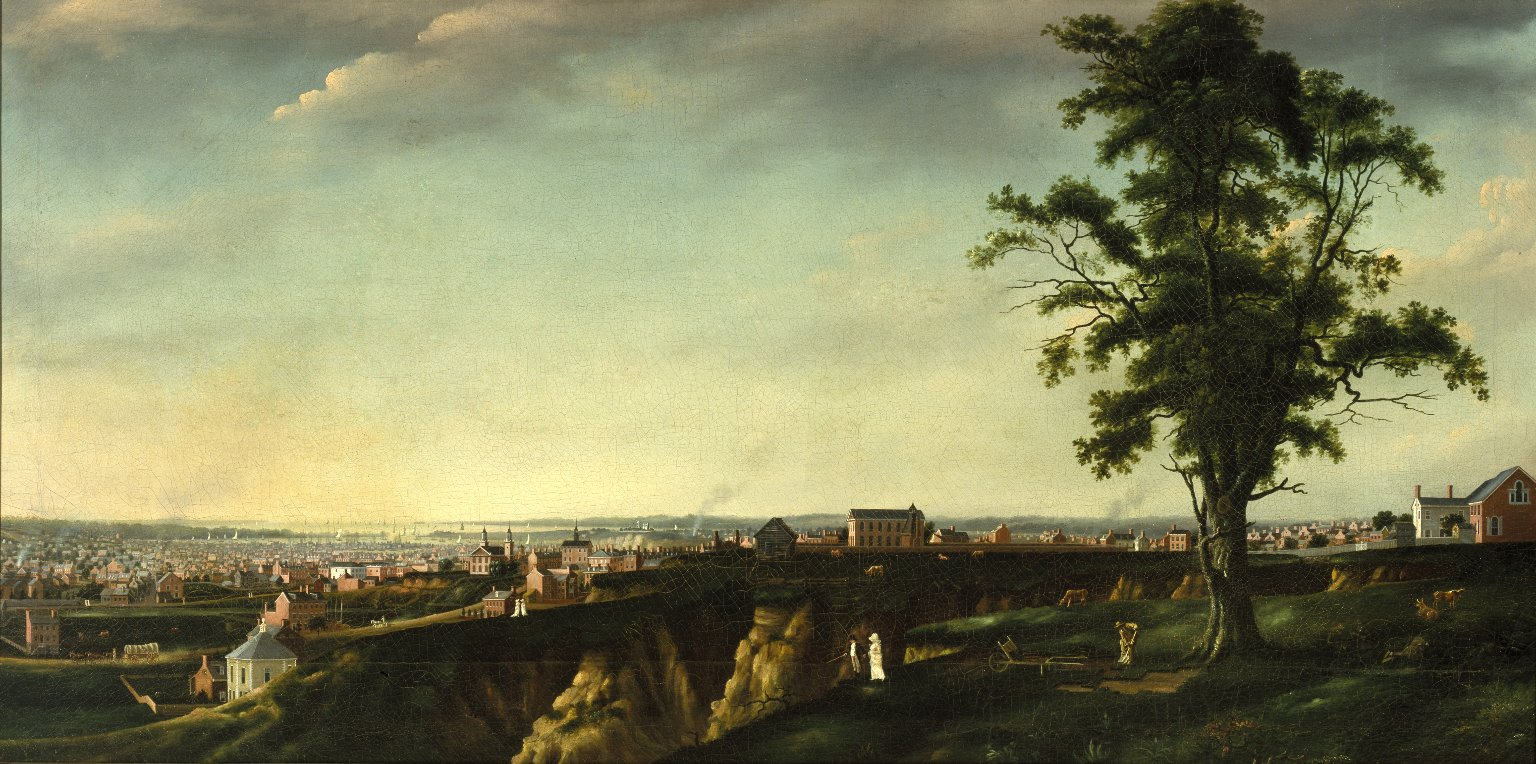
View of Baltimore from Chapel Hill, 1802–03, oil on canvas, Brooklyn Museum

Guy participated in the family business as a London silk dyer before he moved to the United States in September 1795, where he intended to continue his career. He lived briefly in New York and Philadelphia and by 1798 had settled in Baltimore. After a fire destroyed his business in 1799 in Baltimore, Guy decided to devote himself to painting. Although he had no formal art education, Guy was able to learn by himself, with the help of patrons like Robert Gilmor. Robert Gilmor was one of Baltimore’s noted early art collectors, who allowed Guy to copy his pictures. In Baltimore, Guy worked with wealthy clientele creating landscapes of country estates and later he became known for depicting the everyday activities of Baltimore's citizenry. Guy then moved to Brooklyn in 1817, where he stayed until his death in 1820.

The type of landscape paintings Guy produced was relatively new to American art. Indeed, during the colonial period American artists usually depicted idealized subjects chosen from European artistic models rather than painting from nature. Guy died before the completion of the very ambitious exhibition he had planned at the Shakespeare Club in Brooklyn in 1820.

== Bibliography ==
- Brooklyn Museum exhibition: Picturing Place: Francis Guy's Brooklyn, 1820
- Dallas Museum of Art: http://dallasmuseumofart.org:8080/emuseum/view/objects/asitem/search$0040/0?t:state:flow=bc60b99f-65ae-49c9-a7bb-8f85adcc1f6a
