= MultiCharts =

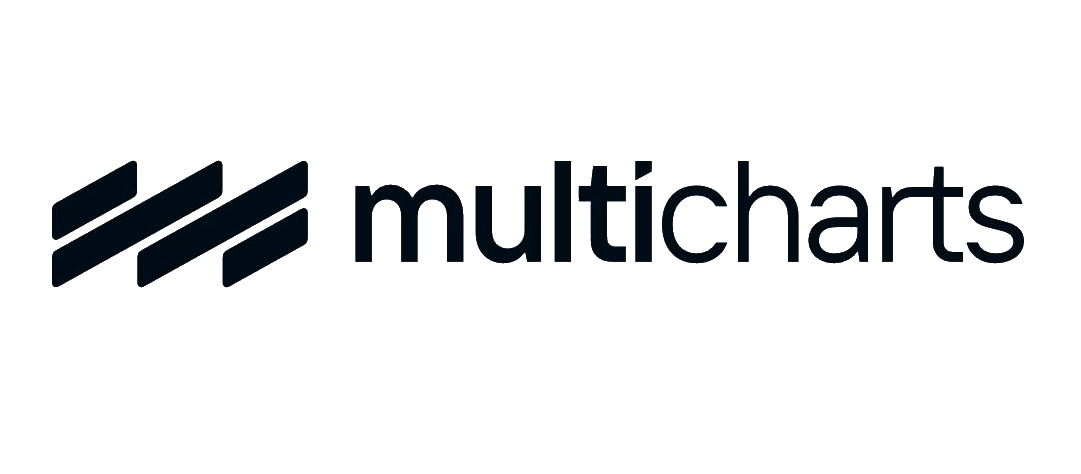
- Developer: MCT Limited
- Stable release: 15.0.28437 / September 2, 2025; 5 months ago
- Operating system: Windows
- Type: Technical analysis software
- License: Proprietary
- Website: multicharts.com

MultiCharts is a Windows-based application which is designed, sold and distributed by MCT Limited. The company is based in Gibraltar. MultiCharts is an electronic trading platform and technical analysis software for analyzing the financial markets and performing trade execution. It uses a proprietary programming language called PowerLanguage.

== MultiCharts Analysis and Trading Platform ==
MultiCharts is a professional electronic trading platform for individual and corporate traders. The platform provides the means to receive market data, perform technical analysis, and send and manage orders to a broker, both manually and automatically. MultiCharts supports multiple data feeds and brokers , and provides the ability to receive market data from a variety of data providers and brokers (i.e. the broker does not also have to be a data provider). The platform comes with a number of publicly available technical indicators and trading systems, which are written in PowerLanguage.

=== PowerLanguage ===
PowerLanguage is very similar to EasyLanguage, which was created and produced by TradeStation. The platform is capable of "understanding" EasyLanguage files, meaning that the files do not need to be converted to another format prior to being used in the platform. Users may write their own indicators and trading systems, copy and paste EasyLanguage script from another source, or import EasyLanguage files (supported file extensions are ELD, ELA and ELS). Protected EasyLanguage files cannot be imported, unless they are unlocked first.

=== QuoteManager ===
The platform includes an organizational tool for data management called the QuoteManager, which saves any loaded data to the local hard drive. This allows the user to examine the data, edit it, delete it, or add to it from some other data source. The database files can be copied to another drive for backing up, or other analytic purposes.

=== Strategy Backtesting ===
The platform supports different modes of backtesting, which is a method used for testing theories about market behavior by applying them to historical data. It is possible to apply a technical indicator or a trading strategy to only one instrument or to a portfolio of instruments at the same time. For portfolio analysis users must use a separate module called the Portfolio Backtester, which comes with the platform.

=== Automated Trading ===
The platform is capable of algorithmic trading, which means that program generated orders are automatically sent to a broker after being triggered by a PowerLanguage script.

=== Discretionary Trading ===
The platform allows the user to generate an order manually (outside of writing, compiling and applying a script to an instrument). Orders can be generated via a vertical ladder style Depth of Market interface, or directly from a market data chart. Discretionary order execution features were introduced in version 7.4 Beta and higher

=== Market Scanner ===
A Market Scanner is a feature also known as a "screener", "radar screen", or "quote board" in other trading software. A scanner is an Excel-like table consisting of many cells that simultaneously display real-time streaming quotes, prices and other market information.

MultiCharts describe their Real-Time Market Scanner as being useful for monitoring, researching, and organizing the stock symbols the user is interested in. Where a single chart gives the user details about one stock symbol, the scanner feature enables the user to view opportunities among many symbols.

== Third Party Add-ons ==
A large number of third-party developers sell add-on extensions for MultiCharts. Since MultiCharts is a development platform, a custom script can be written, called a trading system or trading strategy. If a trader has an idea that needs to be developed, he/she can either write his/her own strategy in PowerLanguage or have his trading system developed by third-party developers.

== Versions ==
The latest version is 15 Release 8. The latest version of MultiCharts .Net version is 15 Release 8.

=== Release history ===
- MultiCharts 15 (March 5, 2024)
- MultiCharts 14 (October 12, 2020)
- MultiCharts 12 (July 8, 2018)
- MultiCharts 11 (August 10, 2017)
- MultiCharts 10 (November 22, 2016)
- MultiCharts 9 (October 62, 2014)
- MultiCharts64 8.7 (July 1, 2013)
- MultiCharts 8.7 (July 1, 2013)
- MultiCharts64 8.5 (February 28, 2013)
- MultiCharts 8.5 (February 28, 2013)
- MultiCharts64 8.0 (June 19, 2012)
- MultiCharts 8.0 (June 19, 2012)
- MultiCharts 7.4 (January 11, 2012)
- MultiCharts 6.01 (August 9, 2010)
- MultiCharts 5.5 (September 10, 2009)
- MultiCharts 5.0 Gold (May 23, 2009)
- MultiCharts 4.0 (October 22, 2008)
- MultiCharts 3.1 (June 25, 2008)
- MultiCharts 3.0 (April 15, 2008)
- MultiCharts 2.1 (September 18, 2007)
- MultiCharts 2.0 (February 18, 2007)
- MultiCharts 1.9 (March 11, 2006)
- MultiCharts 1.8 (November 15, 2005)
- MultiCharts 1.7 (September 16, 2005)
- MultiCharts 1.6 build 50328 (June 28, 2005)
- MultiCharts 1.5 build 50309 (May 9, 2005)
- MultiCharts 1.1 build 40713 (July 13, 2004)

Complete release history along with details for each release can be found here

== Recognition, Reviews & Awards ==
The MultiCharts platform has received recognition from the following third party industry participants:

=== Trade2Win Members Choice Awards ===
In the period spanning from 2008 to 2011 the program has received several awards from the Trade2Win online discussion forum community, including "Best Professional Trading Platform and "Best Software for US Intra-Day Traders".

=== Technical Analysis of Stocks & Commodities ===
Independent reviews of the MultiCharts platform were included in the Technical Analysis of Stocks & Commodities magazine on the following edition:

==== September 2010 citation ====
"MultiCharts is highly flexible trading software designed to let you have choices. This is without doubt the most robust software when it comes to interfacing with datafeeds. MultiCharts is price competitive and definitely one you ought to consider when looking at trading platforms."

==== May 2008 citation ====
"My experiences with MultiCharts have been very favorable, and it's no different with this new and improved version. After seeing the portfolio backtesting features at work, I have to reiterate that the developers put a lot of thought into this product."

=== Traders Magazine ===
Independent reviews of the MultiCharts platform were included in the Traders' magazine on the following edition: "In the modern age of electronic trading, every person who wants to become a trader needs appropriate tools to collect market data, analyse that data and place orders. A new trader has a difficult choice – there are literally hundreds of trading schools, third-party indicators and trading platforms on the market. This article will focus on MultiCharts, a well-established trading platform, but one which remains relatively unknown to mainstream traders."

== See also ==
- List of electronic trading platforms
- List of financial market information services
