= Louis B. Mendelsohn =

- Occupation(s): Chairman & CEO
- Employer(s): Vantagepoint ai, LLC
- Title: CEO

Louis B. Mendelsohn is chairman and chief executive officer of Vantagepoint ai, LLC which he founded in 1979 to develop technical analysis trading software for self-directed traders. His work primarily deals in Artificial Intelligence and Intermarket Analysis to the financial markets.

== Career ==
Mendelsohn has been interviewed live on national radio and television numerous times, including CNN, Bloomberg Television, and CNBC. He has also authored four books on the financial markets, including:

- Trend Forecasting with Technical Analysis: Unleashing the Hidden Power of Intermarket Analysis to Beat the Market, released in December 2000;
- Trend Forecasting with Technical Analysis: Predicting Global Markets with Intermarket Analysis, released in 2008;
- Forex Trading Using Intermarket Analysis: Discovering Hidden Market Relationships That Provide Early Clues For Price Direction, released in March 2006; and
- Supercharged Trading with Artificial Intelligence, released in 2018.

=== Patents ===
On May 14, 2013 the U.S. Patent and Trademark Office awarded Mendelsohn patent 8442891, entitled "Intermarket analysis". Later that year he was awarded a related patent on October 15, 2013 (patent 8560420) entitled “Calculating predictive technical indicators".

== Bibliography ==
- Trend Forecasting With Intermarket Analysis: Predicting Global Markets With Technical Analysis, Marketplace Books, 2008, ISBN 1-59280-332-6
- Forex Trading Using Intermarket Analysis: Discovering Hidden Market Relationships That Provide Early Clues For Price Direction, Marketplace Books, 2006, ISBN 1-59280-295-8
- Trend Forecasting with Technical Analysis: Unleashing the Hidden Power of Intermarket Analysis to Beat the Market, Marketplace Books, 2000, ISBN 1-59280-295-8
- Virtual Trading, Jess Lederman & Robert A. Klein, editors, Probus Publishing, 1995, ISBN 1-55738-812-1, Chapter 5, Synergistic Market Analysis: Combining Technical, Fundamental, and Intermarket Analysis Using Artificial Intelligence.
- High Performance Futures Trading – Power Lessons from the Masters, Joel Robbins, editor, Probus Publishing Company, 1990, ISBN 155738-149-6, Chapter 24, Designing and Testing Trading Systems: How to avoid costly mistakes.
- Trade Your Way to Financial Freedom (second edition), Van K. Tharp, McGraw-Hill, 2007, ISBN 978-0-07-147871-7, Chapter 5, Intermarket Analysis
- Techno Fundamental Trading, Philip Gotthelf, Probus Publishing, 1995, ISBN 1-55738-541-6, Chapter 8, Pattern Recognition, Neural Networks and related Science.
- Technical Analysis of the Financial Markets, John J. Murphy, New York Institute of Finance, 1999, ISBN 0-7352-0066-1, Chapter 17, The Link Between Stocks and Futures; Intermarket Analysis.
- Trading Chicago Style – Insights and strategies of today’s top traders, Neal T. Weintraub, McGraw-Hill, 1999, ISBN 0-07-069632-2, Chapter 13, Louis Mendelsohn: No Market’s an Island, Mendelsohn’s “Method Behind the Madness”.
- The Trader’s & Investor’s Guide to Commodity Trading Systems, Software and Databases, William T. Taylor, Probus Probus Publishing, 1986, ISBN 0-917253-41-8, Chapter 7, ProfitTaker.
- “Market Wrap with John Bollinger”, Financial News Network, September 5, 1986.
- “Profit Taking with Mendelsohn” Interview, Technical Analysis of Stocks & Commodities magazine, August, 1988.
- Supercharged Trading with Artificial Intelligence: The Secret to Success in Today's Financial Markets, 2018.
