= Kst =

KST may refer to:

- Korea Standard Time
- Koren Specific Technique, a new age chiropractic technique
- Korps Speciale Troepen, a Dutch special forces unit.
- KST oscillator, a stock market indicator
- Kantonsschule Stadelhofen, a college in Zürich, Switzerland
- Kst (software), a plotting and data viewing program
- Kay Susan Tayo!
- West Papua National Liberation Army, referred to as the Kelompok Separatis Teroris by the Indonesian government following its designation as a domestic terrorist organization in 2021.
