= Fungibility =

Interchangeability of a commodity

In economics and law, fungibility is the property of something whose individual units are considered fundamentally interchangeable with each other.

For example, the fungibility of money means that a $100 bill (note) is considered entirely equivalent to another $100 bill, or to twenty $5 bills and so on, and therefore a person who borrows $100 in the form of a $100 bill can repay the money with another $100 bill, with twenty $5 bills and so on. Non-fungible items are not considered substitutable in the same manner, even if essentially identical.

Fungibility is an important concept in finance and commerce, where financial securities, currencies and physical commodities such as gold and oil are normally considered fungible. Fungibility affects how legal rights, such as the ownership of assets in custody and the right to receive goods under a contract, apply in certain circumstances, and it thereby simplifies trading and custody.

Fungibility refers only to the equivalence and indistinguishability of each unit of a commodity or other thing with other units of the same thing, and not to the ability to easily trade it for something else or the equivalence of two things in value.

== The nature of fungibility ==
=== Physical goods ===
Fungible goods include gold, other precious metals, crude oil and many agricultural products. The fungibility of these goods facilitates their trading as commodities. In many cases, fungibility within a type of good is divided by grade and quality. For example, crude oil is divided into Brent Crude, West Texas Intermediate and other grades, which are not all fungible with each other.

The legal recognition of fungibility is limited. Units of a single model of a product (a model of microwave or a toy, for example) would not generally be treated as fungible even though identical, as there is no trading in the product and no context in which two units might be considered legally interchangeable. Diamonds and other gems are not considered fungible because their varying cuts, colors, grades, and sizes make each one unique. Even if two could be found to be almost indistinguishable or of equal value, they are not considered fungible with each other because diamonds as a class are not recognised as fungible.

The fungibility of a type of good can sometimes depend on context. Although gold is generally fungible, in whatever form it exists, a unique item such as a gold statuette would not be considered fungible with the same weight of gold in some other form.

=== Securities and currencies ===
The traditional definition of a security, which includes shares, bonds and similar financial instruments, is a "fungible, negotiable instrument". An "instrument" refers to its status as a legal document and "negotiable" means that the owner can transfer it with good title, even though it itself may have had defective title.

Fungibility in securities is most evident in dematerialised securities, which include shares and bonds traded in public markets. These take the form of securities whose ownership is evidenced on a register, or (from the perspective of the ultimate beneficial owner) accounted for in the books of a financial intermediary such as a broker or custodian. The securities do not have any physical form, and the fungibility of the individual shares or bonds is therefore inherent in the registered nature of the securities. If a brokerage account shows that a person holds 50 shares, and another 50 are transferred to that person so that the account now shows 100 shares, it is no longer possible (or conceptually meaningful) to separately identify the original 50 shares and the new 50 shares.

Currencies typically operate in a similar way, taking the form of an entry in a bank account denoting a total amount, rather than individually identifiable units.

Coins and paper bills (notes) do take physical form. However, their form of fungibility is different to that of other physical items, because it rests on the legal status of the currency rather than its physical form. A $10 bill is fungible with two $5 bills even though they are physically different, but is not fungible with a fake $10 bill even though it is physically close to identical.

=== Cryptocurrencies ===
Cryptocurrencies are usually considered to be fungible, where one coin is equivalent to another. Their fungibility operates similarly to that of registered and dematerialised securities.

As with other fungible things, there can be exceptions. After a major breach in Japanese exchange Coincheck, token developers for cryptocurrency NEM added a special flag to hacked coins to indicate they are not to be traded or used, meaning that that hacked coins were no longer fungible with other coins.

Non-fungible tokens (NFTs) are similar to units of blockchain currency, except that they are connected to unique digital files, so that individual tokens can be considered to have a meaningful distinction from others. This distinguishability allows NFTs to have unique use cases, such as their use as blockchain gaming assets, digital collectibles, to indicating ownership of fine art or real assets, used to facilitate decentralized finance loans, and to earn reward tokens.

=== Relationship between fungibility and liquidity ===
Fungibility is distinct from liquidity. A good is fungible if one unit of the good is equivalent to another unit of the same good, whereas a good is said to be liquid if it can be easily exchanged for money or a different good. In practice, fungibility greatly facilitates liquidity.

Not all fungible assets are liquid, however. Shares in private companies are not generally liquid, as transfers are usually severely restricted, but individual shares of a class are nevertheless fungible with each other.

=== Other legal aspects ===
==== United States ====
In legal disputes in the United States, when one party is compelled to remedy another party as the result of a ruling or adjudication, the appropriate legal remedy may depend on the fungibility of the underlying right, obligation or property interest that is intended to be restored. Depending on whether the interests of the aggrieved party are fungible, which is a determination made by the trier of fact, the appropriate remedy may change. For example, a court may require specific performance (an equitable remedy) as a remedy for breach of contract, instead of the more favored remedy of monetary damages.

==== Belgium ====
Belgium has adopted fungibility for its domestic central securities depository CIK (later Euroclear Belgium), which was set up in 1967–1968. According to royal decree No. 62, issued on 10 November 1967, depositors of fungible securities have the rights of co-ownership. This change was fundamental to the development of Euroclear, by then beginning to process Eurobonds and build systems.

== Other uses of the term ==
The concept of fungibility has been applied in other fields by way of analogy.

=== Tasking ===
"Fungibility" has been used to describe certain types of tasks that can be broken down into interchangeable pieces that are easily parallelized and are not interdependent on the other pieces. For example: If a worker can dig one meter of depth of a ditch in a day, and a ten-meter area of ditch needs to be dug, that worker can either be given ten days to complete the entire project or nine more workers can be hired to work side by side (parallelized) for a single day. Each worker can complete their piece of the project without interfering with the other workers, and more importantly, each worker is not dependent on the results of any of the other workers to complete their share of the total project.

On the other hand, non-fungible tasks tend to be highly serial in nature and require the completion of earlier steps before later steps can even be started. For example, if the above example instead needed a ten meter deep ditch with a width of one meter, likely only one worker could dig at a time within the one meter width, the rest would need to wait their turn to dig. The subsequent turns form a series of non-fungible tasks, where the first meter of depth must be dug before the second, and so on. (As a side note, the workers would be fungible, as in this hypothetical they all can dig the same one meter of depth per day, so the order of which worker digs on which day makes no difference, and you could use the same worker for the 10 serial tasks.)

As another example of a serial task that is non-fungible, suppose there was a group of nine newly pregnant women. After one month, these women would have experienced a total of nine months of pregnancy, but a complete baby would not have been formed.

=== Quantum physics ===
Oxford University theoretical physicist David Deutsch has adopted the term "fungible" to describe the physical nature of quantum particles and universes within the quantum multiverse, where, by virtue of being identical in all respects, different particles chaotically divide or combine as a result of physical interactions from a common fungible fund in superposition.

== See also ==
- Currency
- Interchangeable parts
- Substitute good
