= RMO =

RMO may refer to:

- Chișinău International Airport, Moldova; IATA airport code RMO
- Racemethorphan
- Rahul Mohindar oscillator
- Regional Mathematical Olympiad, the second stage in India for selection to India's IMO team
- Regimental Medical Officer
- Resident Medical Officer
- Rijksmuseum van Oudheden
- RMO (cycling team)
- RMO (Norwegian resistance)
- Rocky Mountain oysters
