= Open interest =

Total number of unsettled contracts

Open interest (also known as open contracts or open commitments) refers to the total number of outstanding derivative contracts that have not been settled (offset by delivery).

For each buyer of a futures contract there must be a seller. From the time the buyer or seller opens the contract until the counter-party closes it, that contract is considered 'open'.

Open interest also gives key information regarding the liquidity of an option. If there is no open interest for an option, there is no secondary market for that option. When options have large open interest, they have a large number of buyers and sellers. An active secondary market will increase the odds of getting option orders filled at good prices. All other things being equal, the larger the open interest, the easier it will be to trade that option at a reasonable spread between the bid and ask.

== As a confirming indicator ==
An increase in open interest along with an increase in price is said by proponents of technical analysis to confirm an upward trend. Similarly, an increase in open interest along with a decrease in price confirms a downward trend. An increase or decrease in prices while open interest remains flat or declining may indicate a possible trend reversal.

The relationship between the prevailing price trend and open interest can be summarized by the following table:

Price	Open Interest	Interpretation
Rising	Rising	Market is strong
Rising	Falling	Market is weakening
Falling	Rising	Market is strengthening
Falling	Falling	Market is weak

== See also ==
- Open interest (futures)
