= Monex Group =

Japanese financial services company

Monex Group, Inc. マネックスグループ株式会社
- Type: Public
- Traded as: TYO: 8698
- Industry: Financial services
- Founded: 5 April 1999
- Headquarters: Tokyo, Japan,
- Area served: Worldwide
- Products: Online trading, Brokerage firm, Cryptocurrency, Foreign exchange, Alternative Investment
- Subsidiaries: Monex Inc (aka Monex Securities), Tradestation, Monex Boom, Coincheck
- Website: http://www.monexgroup.jp/

Monex Group, Inc. (マネックスグループ株式会社, Manekkusu Guru-pu Kabushiki-gaisha) is a financial services company based in Tokyo, Japan. Monex Inc., its main subsidiary, engages in online securities trading, with approximately 2 million accounts. In 2010, Monex made ORIX Securities Corporation a wholly owned subsidiary through a share exchange, making ORIX Corporation its largest shareholder with a 22.5% stake. TradeStation, its US subsidiary, provides securities, options, futures and cryptocurrency trading services. In April 2018, Monex Group acquired Coincheck, one of Japan's largest crypto exchanges.

== History ==
=== Founding and early years (1999–2003) ===
Monex, Inc. was founded on April 5, 1999, by Oki Matsumoto, a former Goldman Sachs general partner, in partnership with Sony Corporation. Matsumoto, who had been the youngest General Partner at Goldman Sachs in 1994 at the age of 30, sought to leverage emerging internet technology to democratize access to Japan's capital markets for individual investors.

=== Expansion and consolidation (2004–2013) ===
In 2004, Monex merged with Nikko Beans, Inc. (a subsidiary of Nikko Cordial Corporation), establishing the holding company Monex Beans Holdings, Inc. The new holding company was listed on the First Section of the Tokyo Stock Exchange the following year. The company was renamed Monex Group, Inc. in July 2008.

Monex Group expanded internationally by acquiring Boom Securities (H.K.) Limited and its group companies in Hong Kong in 2010, gaining a foothold in the Asia-Pacific securities market. In the same year, the company integrated ORIX Securities Corporation as a wholly owned subsidiary through a share exchange, making ORIX Corporation the largest shareholder with a 22.5% stake and establishing Monex as an equity method affiliate of ORIX.
