= Rahul Mohindar oscillator =

The Rahul Mohindar oscillator (RMO) is a type of technical analysis indicator developed by Rahul Mohindar of Viratech India. It detects trends in financial markets, and is designed to work on open-high-low-close charts for a wide variety of securities including stocks, commodities and forex.

This analysis is most notably included in version 10 of the MetaStock technical analysis program.
