= EasyLanguage =

Proprietary programming language

- Filename extensions: .eld

Influenced by
- Pascal

EasyLanguage is a proprietary programming language that was developed by TradeStation and built into its electronic trading platform. It is used to create custom indicators for financial charts and also to create algorithmic trading strategies for the markets. External DLL's can be referenced using EasyLanguage which greatly extends its functionality.

The language was originally intended to allow creation of custom trading strategies by traders without specialized computer training. Simple practical commands may consist of regular English words, which makes some of the basic elements of EasyLanguage more intuitive to learn than more complex programming languages.

Example:

- Plain English: "If the close is greater than the high of 1 day ago, then buy 100 shares at market."
- EasyLanguage: "if the Close > the High[1] then Buy 100 shares next bar at market;"

While rudimentary commands can be executed using plain language expressions, computer programming experience is generally required to take full advantage of the more sophisticated algorithmic features of Object Oriented EasyLanguage (OOEL), which has been influenced by Object Pascal, C#, and C++ and makes extensive use of classes and dynamic-link libraries.
