= Open interest (futures) =

Open interest (futures) is the number of "open" contracts or open interest of derivatives in the futures market. Open interest in a derivative is the sum of all contracts that have not expired, been exercised or physically delivered. Moreover, the open interest is the number of long positions or, equivalently, the number of short positions.

Open interest is used as a technical indicator as it is a measure of market activity. Little or no open interest means there is no one opening positions, or nearly all the positions have been closed. High open interest means there are many contracts still open and means that new or additional money coming into the market.
