= Coincheck =

Japanese bitcoin wallet and exchange service

- Founded: Tokyo, Japan (August 2014)
- Headquarters: Tokyo, Japan
- Area served: Japan
- Owner: Monex
- Founders: Koichiro Wada; Yusuke Otsuka
- Products: Bitcoin exchange and wallet service
- Website: Official website

Coincheck is a Japanese bitcoin wallet and exchange service headquartered in Tokyo, Japan, founded by Koichiro Wada and Yusuke Otsuka. It operates exchanges between bitcoin, ether and fiat currencies in Japan, and bitcoin transactions and storage in some countries.

In April 2018, Coincheck was acquired by Monex Group for 3.6 billion yen. (US33.4 million)

== History ==
Coincheck started in August 2014 and is operated by Coincheck, inc. (previously ResuPress, inc) (founded in 2012). There were then more than 2,200 merchants using their bitcoin payment solution, just in Japan. Coincheck is a member of JBA (Japan Blockchain Association) and is actively helping to build the Japanese bitcoin community's usage standards with the government.

Coincheck partnered with SEKAI to support Chinese, Hong Kong, and Taiwan investors to buy Japanese real estate with bitcoin.

=== 2018 hacking incident ===
In January 2018, Coincheck was hacked and approximately 500 million NEM tokens ($530 million) were stolen. The currency was transferred through a total of nineteen accounts, one of which was found to have no connection to the hacker.

The hack led two of Japan's cryptocurrency trade groups to merge into a new self-regulatory organization. The Financial Services Agency took administrative action by ordering Coincheck to improve its security practices, but did not order the exchange to shut down, citing concern for the protection of its users. Coincheck initially announced that it might not be able to compensate all users affected by the hack, but later stated that it would repay all 260,000 affected users in Japanese yen using its own capital. As of February 2021, the Tokyo Public Prosecutors Office had charged 31 individuals for their involvement in transactions involving stolen NEM tokens. In total, these individuals converted around 18.8 billion yen worth of stolen coins into other cryptocurrencies.

After the hack, Coincheck temporarily suspended trading and reimbursed its customers for their losses. The company also implemented new security measures, including enhanced KYC (know your customer) procedures, a review of its management system, and strengthened internal controls.
