= ESignal =

Windows-based application

eSignal
- Developer: Intercontinental Exchange
- Stable release: ver. 21.4 / January 2024
- Operating system: Windows
- Standard: .page .efs
- Type: Technical analysis program
- License: proprietary
- Website: www.esignal.com

eSignal, a Windows-based analysis application for investors and traders. Allows to use JavaScript as the basis for the scripting language EFS that programmers and traders can use for building custom indicators. This, in effect, includes eSignal users in the base from which to draw programmers for writing indicators.

== Advertisement for the company ==
eSignal provides streaming, real-time market data, news and analytics. The other products offered under the eSignal brand include eSignal, Advanced GET, eSignal OnDemand,

eSignal, Advanced GET, couples eSignal's market data, back testing and trading strategy tools with a proprietary set of indicators, including the Elliott Oscillator, eXpert Trend Locator and False Bar Stochastic and many others. Its rules-based set-ups include the signature Advanced GET Type 1 and 2 trades.
