= Intermarket analysis =

In finance, intermarket analysis refers to the study of how "different sectors of the market move in relationships with other sectors." Technical analyst John J. Murphy pioneered this field.
