= TradeStation =

American electronic trading platform

- Type: Corporation (TradeStation Group. Inc)
- Industry: Financial services
- Founded: 1982; 44 years ago (formed as Omega Research, Inc.)
- Headquarters: Plantation, Florida, United States
- Key people: John Bartleman (president)
- Products: Electronic trading platform
- Services: Broker, Stockbroker
- Parent: Monex Group
- Website: tradestation.com

TradeStation Group, Inc. is the parent company of online securities and futures brokerage firms and trading technology companies. It is headquartered in Plantation, Florida, and has offices in New York; Chicago; Richardson, Texas; London; Sydney; and Costa Rica. TradeStation is best known for the technical analysis software and electronic trading platform it provides to active traders and certain institutional trader markets. TradeStation Group was a Nasdaq GS-listed company from 1997 to 2011, until it was acquired by Monex Group, a Tokyo Stock Exchange-listed parent company of one of Japan's leading online securities brokerage firms.

== History ==
TradeStation was founded in 1982 by brothers William (Bill) and Rafael (Ralph) Cruz. The company focused on developing software tools that enabled traders without formal programming backgrounds to design, test, and automate trading strategies. During this period, Omega Research developed EasyLanguage, a proprietary scripting language intended to simplify the creation and testing of trading systems. Because Tradestation is a development platform, a custom trading program can be developed called a trading system or trading strategy.

In 1987, Omega Research released System Writer, a software product that allowed users to develop and back-test trading strategies using historical market data. This was followed in 1989 by System Writer Plus, which expanded charting and analytical capabilities.

The company introduced TradeStation, its flagship trading platform, in 1991. In the mid-1990s, Omega Research expanded its product offerings, including the launch of OptionStation in 1996, an options analysis tool. In 1997, the company completed an initial public offering and became listed on the Nasdaq National Market.

By the late 1990s, Omega Research began shifting toward internet-based services. In 1999, it launched RadarScreen, a market-scanning application, and acquired Window On WallStreet, later introducing WindowOnWallStreet.com as an online charting and analytics service. In 2000, the company released TradeStation 6, an internet-based trading platform, and acquired the direct-access brokerage Onlinetrading.com, which was subsequently renamed TradeStation Securities, Inc.

In 2001, Omega Research reorganized its corporate structure, with TradeStation Group becoming the publicly traded parent company, and the Nasdaq trading symbol changing from OMGA to TRAD. During the early 2000s, TradeStation integrated its trading software with brokerage services, enabling combined back-testing, order generation, and trade execution for securities and futures markets. By 2004 and 2005, the firm became a self-clearing equities and options brokerage.

TradeStation expanded internationally in 2006, when its UK subsidiary received authorization from the Financial Conduct Authority as an introducing broker. In 2011, TradeStation Group was acquired by the Japanese financial services company Monex Group.

== Corporate structure ==
TradeStation Group, Inc.'s principal operating subsidiaries are TradeStation Securities, Inc. and TradeStation Technologies, Inc. TradeStation Group is a wholly owned subsidiary of Monex Group, Inc., one of Japan's largest online financial services providers.

TradeStation Securities, Inc. is a member of the New York Stock Exchange (NYSE), Financial Industry Regulatory Authority (FINRA), Securities Investor Protection Corporation (SIPC), Depository Trust & Clearing Corporation (DTCC), Options Clearing Corporation (OCC) and the National Futures Association (NFA). It is a licensed securities broker-dealer and a registered futures commission merchant, and is also a member of the Boston Options Exchange, Chicago Board Options Exchange, Chicago Stock Exchange, International Securities Exchange and NASDAQ OMX. The company's technology subsidiary, TradeStation Technologies, Inc., develops and offers strategy trading software tools and subscription services. Its London-based subsidiary, TradeStation International Ltd., a Financial Services Authority-authorized brokerage firm, introduces the UK and other European accounts to TradeStation Securities, Inc.

Monex Group, Inc. provides online investment and trading services for retail and institutional customers around the world through its subsidiaries, including Monex, Inc. in Japan, TradeStation in the U.S. and Europe, and Monex Boom in Hong Kong.

Its main subsidiary, Monex Inc., one of Japan's largest online securities brokerages, provides financial services to its nearly one million individual investors. Monex Group's services also cover M&A advisory, debt and equity underwriting, asset management focusing on alternative investments, investment education, and other investment banking functions in Japan.

== TradeStation analysis and trading platform ==
The TradeStation analysis and trading platform is a professional electronic trading platform for financial market traders. It provides extensive functionality for receiving real-time data, displaying charts, entering orders, and managing outstanding orders and market positions. Although it comes with a large number of pre-defined indicators, strategy components, and analysis tools, individuals can modify and customize existing indicators and strategies, as well as create their own indicators and strategies using TradeStation's proprietary object-oriented EasyLanguage programming language. Traders can also access hundreds of TradeStation-compatible products created by independent third-party developers through the TradeStation TradingApp Store, as well as access strategy trading ideas submitted by the TradeStation community in the EasyLanguage Library.

TradeStation supports the development, testing, optimizing, and automation of all aspects of trading. Trading strategies can be back-tested and refined against historical data in simulated trading before being traded "live". TradeStation can be used either as a research and testing tool or as a trading platform.

== See also ==
- List of electronic trading platforms
