= MetaStock =

- Developer: MetaStock
- Stable release: V18 / 14 February 2022; 4 years ago
- Operating system: Microsoft Windows
- Type: Technical analysis program
- Website: www.metastock.com

MetaStock is a proprietary computer program originally released by Computer Asset Management in 1985. It is used for charting and technical analysis of stock (and other asset) prices. It has both real-time and end-of-day versions. MetaStock is a product of Innovative Market Analysis.

== Early history ==
In 1982 Steve Achelis started a company named Computer Asset Management to develop financial and technical analysis software for personal computers. Computer Asset Management was renamed Equis International in 1989. Achelis’ first software application, written for the Apple II+, was The Financial Package which calculated various financial planning metrics. The Market Mood Monitor was released in 1984 and was eventually renamed The Technician. The Technician, written for the IBM PC, helped investors analyze and chart broad market conditions using sentiment, momentum, and monetary indicators. MetaStock 1.0 was released in 1986. Both MetaStock and The Technician received PC Magazine’s Editor’s Choice award in April 1986.

While The Technician analyzed broad market conditions, MetaStock analyzed individual securities (stocks, futures, mutual funds, etc.). In response to the increasing demand for real-time analysis of prices, MetaStock RT was released in July 1992. MetaStock RT received live, real-time quotes from Data Broadcasting’s Signal data feed. In 1995, MetaStock 5.0 was released for the Microsoft Windows 3.1 operating system. Later that year, MetaStock added support for the Reuters DataLink end-of-day data feed. This relationship with Reuters led to Reuters purchasing Equis International and its MetaStock software in 1996. In 1998, MetaStock was released for the Reuters Quotron data feed and in 2001 for the Reuters 3000 Xtra electronic trading platform. In June 2013, Thomson Reuters sold MetaStock to Innovative Market Analysis.

== Versions ==
Major releases	Year released	Operating system
MetaStock 1.0	1985	DOS
MetaStock 2.0	1987	DOS
MetaStock 3.0	1989	DOS
MetaStock 4.0/4.5 RT	1992	DOS
MetaStock 5.0	1995	Windows 3.1
MetaStock 6.0	1996	Windows95/NT
MetaStock 6.5	1997	Windows95/NT
MetaStock 6.5 for Quotron	1998	Windows95/NT
MetaStock 6.5 for Reuters Terminal	1998	Windows95/98/NT
MetaStock 7.0	1998	Windows95/98/NT
Reuters MetaStock Pro 7.1	2001	Windows95/98/NT/2000
MetaStock 8.0	2002	Windows 2000/XP
MetaStock 9.0	2004	Windows 2000/XP
MetaStock 10.0	2006	XP
MetaStock 10.1	2007	XP/Vista
MetaStock 11.0	2008	Windows XP/Vista/7
MetaStock 12.0	2012	Windows XP/Vista/7/8
MetaStock 13.0	2013	Windows XP/Vista/7/8
MetaStock 14.0	2015	Windows 7/8
MetaStock 15.0	2016	Windows 7/8/10
MetaStock 16.0	2018	Windows 7/8/10
MetaStock 17.0	2019	Windows 7/8/10
MetaStock 18.0	2022	Windows 10/11
MetaStock 19.0	2024	Windows 10/11
