= List of hedge funds =

Below is a list of notable hedge funds.

== Largest hedge fund firms ==
Below are the 20 largest hedge funds in the world ranked by discretionary assets under management (AUM) as of mid-2025. Only assets in private funds following hedge fund strategies are counted. Some of these managers also manage public funds and offer non-hedge fund strategies.

The data for this table comes from Pensions & Investments with data compiled as of June 2025.

| Rank | Firm | Headquarters | AUM as of June 2025 (millions of USD) |
|---|---|---|---|
| 1 | Bridgewater Associates | (United States) Westport, CT | $78,000 |
| 2 | Millennium Management, LLC | (United States) New York, NY | $77,518 |
| 3 | Elliott Investment Management | (United States) West Palm Beach, FL | $76,100 |
| 4 | Citadel LLC | (United States) Miami, FL | $67,586 |
| 5 | Man Group | (United Kingdom) London, UK | $66,500 |
| 6 | D. E. Shaw & Co. | (United States) New York, NY | $60,417 |
| 7 | AQR Capital | (United States) Greenwich, CT | $51,000 |
| 8 | Two Sigma | (United States) New York, NY | $51,000 |
| 9 | Goldman Sachs Asset Management | (United States) New York, NY | $48,000 |
| 10 | Renaissance Technologies | (United States) East Setauket, NY | $46,000 |
| 11 | Marshall Wace | (United Kingdom) London, UK | $36,795 |
| 12 | Wellington Management Group | (United States) Boston, MA | $36,421 |
| 13 | Davidson Kempner Capital Management | (United States) New York, NY | $35,140 |
| 14 | Capula Investment Management | (United Kingdom) London, UK | $31,900 |
| 15 | Brevan Howard | St Helier, Jersey | $31,224 |
| 16 | GoldenTree Asset Management | (United States) New York, NY | $31,000 |
| 17 | Pacific Investment Management Co. | (United States) Newport Beach, CA | $30,100 |
| 18 | BlackRock | (United States) New York, NY | $28,577 |
| 19 | Ruffer | (United Kingdom) London, UK | $25,392 |
| 20 | D1 Capital Partners | (United States) New York, NY | $23,100 |

== Notable hedge fund firms ==
=== Americas ===
- Acadian Asset Management
- Adage Capital Management
- Alphadyne Asset Management
- AlphaSimplex Group
- Altimeter Capital
- Angelo Gordon
- Appaloosa Management
- AQR Capital Management
- Archegos Capital Management
- Assured Investment Management
- Atlantic Investment Management
- Aurelius Capital Management
- Avenue Capital Group
- Baker Brothers Advisors
- Balyasny Asset Management
- Beach Point Capital Management
- Bracebridge Capital
- Bridgewater Associates
- Canyon Capital Advisors
- Capstone Investment Advisors
- Citadel LLC
- Coatue Management
- D1 Capital Partners
- Davidson Kempner Capital Management
- Deerfield Management
- D. E. Shaw & Co.
- Discovery Capital Management
- Dragoneer Investment Group
- Ellington Management Group
- Elliott Investment Management
- Engineers Gate
- ESL Investments
- ExodusPoint Capital Management
- Farallon Capital
- Fortress Investment Group
- Garda Capital Partners
- GCM Grosvenor
- Glenview Capital Management
- GoldenTree Asset Management
- Graham Capital Management
- Gramercy Funds Management
- Greenlight Capital
- Harbinger Capital
- HBK Investments
- Highbridge Capital Management
- Highfields Capital Management
- Himalaya Capital
- Hudson Bay Capital Management
- Jain Global
- JANA Partners LLC
- K2 Advisors
- King Street Capital Management
- Lighthouse Investment Partners
- Lone Pine Capital
- Magnetar Capital
- Marathon Asset Management
- Maverick Capital
- Millennium Management, LLC
- Moore Capital Management
- OrbiMed
- Ospraie Management, LLC
- PanAgora Asset Management
- Pantera Capital
- Paulson & Co.
- PDT Partners
- Perceptive Advisors
- Pershing Square Capital Management
- Quantum Fund
- RA Capital Management
- Renaissance Technologies
- Revere Capital Advisors
- Saba Capital Management
- Schonfeld Strategic Advisors
- Scion Asset Management
- Sculptor Capital Management
- Silver Point Capital
- SkyBridge Capital
- SPX Capital
- Squarepoint Capital
- Statar Capital
- Sylebra Capital
- TGS Management
- Third Point Management
- Tiger Global Management
- Touradji Capital Management
- Trian Partners
- Tudor Investment Corporation
- Tsai Capital
- Two Sigma
- Universa Investments
- ValueAct Capital
- Verition Fund Management
- Viking Global Investors
- Voloridge Investment Management
- Walleye Capital
- Waterfall Asset Management
- Wellington Management Company
- WorldQuant
- Wynnefield Capital
- Voleon Group
- York Capital Management

=== Asia-Pacific ===
- BFAM Partners
- Dymon Asia
- Greenwoods Asset Management
- High-Flyer
- Hillhouse Capital Group
- Lingjun Investment
- Maso Capital
- Minghong Investment
- Navigator Global Investments
- Oasis Management
- Perseverance Asset Management
- Pinpoint Asset Management
- Platinum Asset Management
- Quantedge
- Segantii Capital Management
- SPARX Group
- Tybourne Capital Management
- Ubiquant
- Value Partners
- Yanfu Investments

=== EMEA ===
- AKO Capital
- Aspect Capital
- BlueCrest Capital Management
- Brevan Howard
- Capital Fund Management
- Capula Investment Management
- Caxton Associates
- Cheyne Capital
- CQS
- Egerton Capital
- Eisler Capital
- G-Research
- GLG Partners
- GSA Capital
- Lansdowne Partners
- LMR Partners
- Man Group
- Marshall Wace
- Pharo Management
- Qube Research & Technologies
- Rokos Capital Management
- Ruffer Investment Company
- Scipion Capital
- Systematica Investments
- The Children's Investment Fund Management
- Toscafund Asset Management
- Winton Group

== See also ==
- List of private-equity firms
- Boutique investment bank
- List of venture capital firms
- Sovereign wealth fund
- List of exchange-traded funds
