= Quantitative fund =

Investment fund using mathematical methods

A quantitative fund is an investment fund that relies on systematic, data-driven methods, such as mathematical models, statistical techniques, AI, and machine learning, to make investment decisions, rather than fundamental human analysis. These funds are often referred to as systematic funds, and many employ factor investing strategies such as value and momentum, which are widely studied in academic finance.

== Investment approach ==
An investment process is considered quantitative when investment management is fully based on the use of mathematical and statistical methods to make investment decisions. If investment decisions are based on fundamental analysis and human judgement, the process is classified as fundamental. A typical quantitative process can be divided into three components:

- Input system: Providing all necessary inputs such as market data and rules (see financial data vendor);
- Forecasting engine: Generating estimations for risks, returns and other parameters;
- Portfolio construction engine: portfolio composition using optimizers or a heuristics-based system (see Portfolio optimization and Mathematical tools).

Quantitative portfolio managers and quantitative analysts typically have backgrounds in mathematics, statistics, computer science, or often combined with training in finance or economics. Many quantitative specialists have a PhD in Financial Economics, Engineering or Mathematics. Their work involves applying statistical models and optimization methods to identify and exploit systematic patterns in financial markets using the latest academic insights. These strategies range from high-frequency trading, which relies on rapid execution and short holding periods, to factor-based approaches that target longer-term risk premia.

== History ==
Hedge funds have been a key driver of quantitative fund growth since the 1980s, with early pioneers like Renaissance Technologies employing mathematical models for systematic trading, as detailed in the book More Money than God. Over subsequent decades, quantitative methods expanded beyond hedge funds, with large asset managers like BlackRock and Dimensional launching quantitatively managed mutual funds and exchange-traded funds (ETFs). While equity strategies historically dominated, fixed-income and multi-asset quantitative funds have gained traction, fueled by AI and alternative data.

By the mid-2010s, assets in quantitatively managed funds (including mutual funds and ETFs) were estimated in the hundreds of billions of U.S. dollars. Vanguard reported in 2006 that quantitative strategies accounted for ~16% of U.S. actively managed assets, up from 13% in 2003, a share estimated to have grown to ~20% by 2024. By 2024, global quant fund AUM reached approximately $2–3 trillion, with quant hedge funds alone managing ~$1.2-1.5 trillion (25-30% of total hedge fund AUM of $4.5-4.9 trillion), driven by performance gains and inflows.

== Quantitative Fund Strategies ==
There are essentially countless strategies that quantitative funds can use, as there are a multitude of market interrelations that can be analyzed, modeled, and acted upon. The most famous ones include:

- Statistical arbitrage - A market-neutral approach that exploits short-term mispricings between related securities using statistical models; often executed at high frequency.
- Momentum following - A strategy that buys assets with recent positive returns and sells those with negative ones, based on probability of persistence of trends.
- Mean reversion - Assumes prices revert to historical averages; trades are executed or placed when assets deviate significantly from typical levels.
- Market making - Involves continuously quoting bid and ask prices to provide liquidity, profiting from the spread while managing inventory risk.
- Factor investing - Targets systematic sources of return such as value ratios, momentum, or low volatility through systematic rules-based portfolio construction.
- Volatility arbitrage - Exploits differences between implied and realized volatility, typically using options and delta-based hedging techniques.
- Predictive Price Volatility Modeling - Uses statistical or machine learning models to forecast future volatility, informing trading, hedging, and facilitation risk management.
- Algorithmic news-based trading - Applies sentiment analysis of news and textual data to generate trading signals and react quickly to new information (leveraging high-frequency trading).
- Cross-asset quant strategies - Identifies and trades based on statistically relevant relationships across asset classes (e.g. equities, bonds, FX, commodities) based on macro or relative value signals.

These strategies are most often combined, rather than used independently and are heavily leveraged by major quant trading shops, which significantly contributes to colossal daily trading volumes and instantaneous market inefficiencies worldwide, as these enterprises tap into financial markets globally and leverage these and other strategies at a massive scale.

It is also worth noting that mean reversion is often not a separate strategy on its own, but rather incorporated into other ones, such as arbitrage or momentum following, as quant traders assume that prices will eventually converge (which constitutes basis for statistical arbitrage), or that temporary micro price spikes or lumps will momentarily revert (which is often assumed in many sub-strategies of momentum-based trading).

== Performance ==
Many quantitative funds have achieved strong long-term risk-adjusted returns by exploiting systematic factors like value, momentum, low volatility, and quality. However, several factors underperformed from 2018 to 2020, a period dubbed the "quant winter." Since 2021, a "quant thaw" has driven a rebound, with quant hedge funds posting ~10-17% returns in 2024, led by equity quant and multi-strategy approaches, bolstered by AI/ML advancements and favorable market conditions.

== Fund structures ==
Quantitative strategies are implemented through several types of investment vehicles:

- Hedge funds: The first quantitative funds were offered as hedge funds and not available to the general public. They typically seek absolute returns with relatively few constraints and may use leverage, short selling, and derivatives.
- Mutual funds: With the increasing popularity of quant investing, quant strategies were also wrapped into mutual funds. Quantitative mutual funds generally aim to deliver alpha on top of a benchmark index, such as a broad stock market index.
- Exchange traded funds (ETFs): Quantitative strategies have also been introduced in ETFs. Many are designed to track systematic or rules-based indices and are often described as smart-beta products. More recently, actively managed ETFs have been launched that apply quantitative models while retaining daily liquidity and transparency requirements.

Hedge funds generally have the greatest flexibility, employing approaches such as market neutral strategies, statistical arbitrage, or high-frequency trading. ETFs are typically more constrained, though the growth of active ETF structures has broadened the ways in which quantitative strategies can be delivered.

== Notable firms ==
The following firms are known for their quantitative funds.

- Acadian Asset Management
- AlphaSimplex Group
- AQR Capital
- Arrowstreet Capital
- Bridgewater Associates
- Capital Fund Management
- Capula Investment Management
- Citadel LLC
- D. E. Shaw & Co.
- Dimensional Fund Advisors
- Engineers Gate
- Geode Capital Management
- GSA Capital
- Jane Street Capital
- Jupiter Asset Management
- Lingjun Investment
- LSV Asset Management
- Man Group
- Millennium Management, LLC
- Minghong Investment
- PanAgora Asset Management
- PDT Partners
- Point72 Asset Management
- Renaissance Technologies
- Robeco
- Squarepoint Capital
- Quantedge
- Qube Research & Technologies
- Systematica Investments
- TGS Management
- Two Sigma
- Ubiquant
- Voleon Group
- Voloridge Investment Management
- Winton Group
- WorldQuant
- Yanfu Investments

The largest asset managers such as "big three" BlackRock, State Street, and Vanguard also offer quantitative funds to investors.

== See also ==
- Quantitative investing
- Factor investing
- Value investing
- Momentum investing
- Low-volatility investing
- Systematic trading
- Smart beta
