= 130–30 fund =

A 130–30 fund or a ratio up to 150/50 is a type of collective investment vehicle, often a type of specialty mutual fund, but which allows the fund manager simultaneously to hold both long and short positions on different equities in the fund. Traditionally, mutual funds were long-only investments. 130–30 funds are a fast-growing segment of the financial industry; they should be available both as traditional mutual funds, and as exchange-traded funds (ETFs). While this type of investment has existed for a while in the hedge fund industry, its availability for retail investors is relatively new.

A 130–30 fund is considered a long-short equity fund, meaning it goes both long and short at the same time. The "130" portion stands for 130% exposure to its long portfolio and the "30" portion stands for 30% exposure to its short portfolio. The structure usually ranges from 120 to 20 up to 150–50 with 130–30 being the most popular and is limited to 150/50 because of Reg T limiting the short side to 50%.

== Mathematics and etymology ==
A 130–30 fund, or more generally a 1X0/X0 fund, gives ordinary investors a taste of an investing strategy that has been popular among hedge funds, lightly regulated investment pools for institutions and high-net-worth individuals. Like other "long-short" mutual funds, the 130–30 funds have traditional "long" holdings of stocks but also sell other stocks "short" in a bet that prices will fall. In a short sale, investors sell borrowed shares with the hope of repurchasing them later at a lower price.

130–30 funds work by investing, say, $100 in a basket of stocks. They then short $30 in stocks that they believe to be overvalued. Proceeds from that short sale are then used to purchase an additional $30 in stocks thought to be undervalued. The name reflects the fact that the manager ends up with $130 invested in traditional long positions and $30 invested short. A common strategy is to use a traditional index, such as the S&P 500 or NASDAQ-100, and then rate the stocks comprising that index by a proprietary method; the top stocks would be held long, the bottom stocks short.

== Comparison with other investment vehicles ==
130–30 strategies share three investment techniques with hedge funds; they are allowed to use short selling, they are leveraged vehicles and they typically have a performance-linked compensation. There are also vast differences, firstly they do not seek absolute returns regardless of the performance of the market. Instead 130–30 strategies aim at outperforming an index or another benchmark just like a traditional investment fund. Johnson et al. (2007) argue that despite the similarities to hedge funds, a 130–30 strategy is more like a long-only strategy because it is managed to a benchmark and has a 100% exposure to the market. Therefore, a 130–30 strategy's performance should be evaluated similar to a long-only strategy and compared with its benchmark. Market exposure is also called beta, and 100% exposure equals a beta of one. For this reason, both long-only and 130–30 are often referred to as beta-one strategies. In contrast, hedge funds with a market-neutral long-short strategy, by definition, have a beta of zero. Secondly, 130–30 funds are typically regulated under the jurisdiction of traditional investment funds, and for this reason they are allowed to market themselves to the general public. This, in combination with the fact that the risk and return profile of 130–30 structures is similar to the long-only framework, makes them suitable to attract long-only money.

The primary purpose of the 130–30 funds is to tap into the large pool of assets allocated to long-only managers, while the primary rationale of the strategy is to attempt to construct more efficient portfolios by allowing limited short selling. The world's 500 largest long-only fund managers have a total of assets under management of $63.7 trillion. In comparison, global hedge fund assets are estimated to $2.48 trillion, or 3.9% of that. It is obvious that the long-only funds manage a large chunk of money that everyone is interested in. The global assets of 130–30 funds are in perspective very small, approximately $53.3 billion. Nevertheless, the fund segment is growing rapidly; assets increased with 78.5% over the first nine months of 2007. The fee structure of 130–30 funds is, as mentioned above, closer related to that of hedge funds than that of long-only funds. In general, the performance fee is on average very similar to the hedge fund average, while the management fee is typically lower, and in-between long-only and hedge funds.

The trade-off between long-only, 130–30 and market neutral long-short funds depends on two factors: (1) If one has a neutral or negative market view and does not want any beta exposure, then one should invest into a market neutral long-short hedge fund. However, if one has a positive market view and wants beta exposure, then one should invest into either a long-only or 130–30 strategy. (2) If one believes that the fund manager can generate alpha from the short leg, then it is better to invest into a 130–30 strategy rather than a long-only strategy. However, if one believes, that the manager cannot generate alpha from short selling or that the higher gross exposure of a 130–30 fund is unbearable, then one should invest into a long-only strategy.

The greater part of hedge funds describe themselves as market neutral long-short equity strategies. The purpose of all market neutral long-short funds is to run an absolute-return strategy. Consequently, the aim of the investment strategy is to produce profits regardless of market direction. Many hedge funds and market neutral long-short funds were started following the last bear market from 2000 to 2002, endorsed by a prolonged bear market that sparked interest in absolute returns and the separation of alpha and beta management. The worldwide growth in hedge funds was driven by three factors: the equity bear market; investor interest in absolute returns due to heavy losses and the flow of top talent into those hedge funds notching up absolute returns. Typically, market neutral long-short funds will have a beta exposure between 30% net long to 10% net short. Since market neutral long-short returns often move in a different direction from the overall market, it can help investors to diversify their portfolios. In neutral or bear market scenarios, the advantages of market neutral long-short are prevailing. In bull markets, market neutral long-short strategies tend not to be able to generate better returns than other investment strategies. In comparison, it would be advantageous to invest into a 130–30 fund in a strong bull market. The main obvious similarity between these strategies and 130–30 is that both strategies have both long and short positions. Market neutral hedge funds typically charge a performance fee, in line with most 130–30 funds. On the other hand, they are not managed to an index, but instead use the risk-free interest rate as their benchmark.

The holy grail of alpha hunting and absolute returns is a zero-sum game, producing winners and losers. A fact that often seems to be overlooked is that performance fees, besides aligning the interest of fund managers with investors, also attain top talent. Since alpha is difficult to extract, the single most important factor of active management is the talent of the fund manager. According to a hedge fund survey in 2005, the three key risks for the fund segment is overcrowding, poor returns and mis-pricing. In effect, the argument is that due to overcrowding the alpha available for capture by hedge funds has to spread over more funds, resulting in lower returns. Furthermore, the study concluded that two in three pension funds believe that worldwide overcapacity will drive down the returns. These risks are also noteworthy for 130–30 strategies. As an asset class, hedge funds have recorded an annual return of 10.7% since 1994, according to CSFB/Tremont, which tracks about 400 hedge funds. That is marginally ahead of the S&P 500's annual gains over the period of 10.4%. In this perspective, beta seems to offer rather attractive risk-adjusted returns over time. Conclusively, one could argue that it might be desirable to invest in a strategy that can offer both beta and the potential upsides of long-short strategies in terms of alpha generation. Nevertheless, 130–30 is first and foremost not competing with market neutral long-short funds as an investment vehicle. Instead, they should be viewed as an alternative to long-only funds, where managers can use short selling as a possible additional source of alpha.

== Exchange-traded funds (ETFs) ==
Credit Suisse developed the 130/30 index. In partnership with Andrew Lo of MIT and AlphaSimplex Group, Philip Vasan formerly of Credit Suisse and now BlackRock and Pankaj Patel formerly of Credit Suisse and now Cirrus Research launched the first passive and investible 130/30 Equity index to compare performance of 130–30 fund. They also created the first and only 130/30 ETF in partnership with ProShares.

ProShares Large Cap Core Plus that track the performance of the Credit Suisse 130/30 Large Cap Index (CSM). The performance of the index matches their study published in The Journal of Portfolio Management.

They have applied for a patent for the 130/30 index. They received the Jacobs Levy Award: The Tenth Annual Bernstein Fabozzi / Jacobs Levy Award Awards of Excellence for Outstanding Article 130/30: The New Long-Only, Appearing in The Journal of Portfolio Management, Winter 2008.
