= Vasan =

Vasan may refer to:

== Businesses and organizations ==
- Vasateatern, also called Vasan, a private theater in Stockholm, Sweden

== People ==
=== With the surname ===
- Anjana Vasan (born 1987), Indian-Singaporean actress
- Ashwin Vasan (born 1980), American physician and epidemiologist
- G. K. Vasan (born 1964), Indian politician
- K. S. Vasan, Indian politician
- Nina Vasan (born 1984), American psychiatrist and author
- Philip Vasan, American banker
- S. S. Vasan (1904–1969), Indian writer, journalist, filmmaker, and businessman

=== With the given name ===
- Vasan Sitthiket (born 1957), Thai artist

== See also ==
- Vazan (disambiguation)
