= Claudio Cisullo =

Swiss entrepreneur and investor

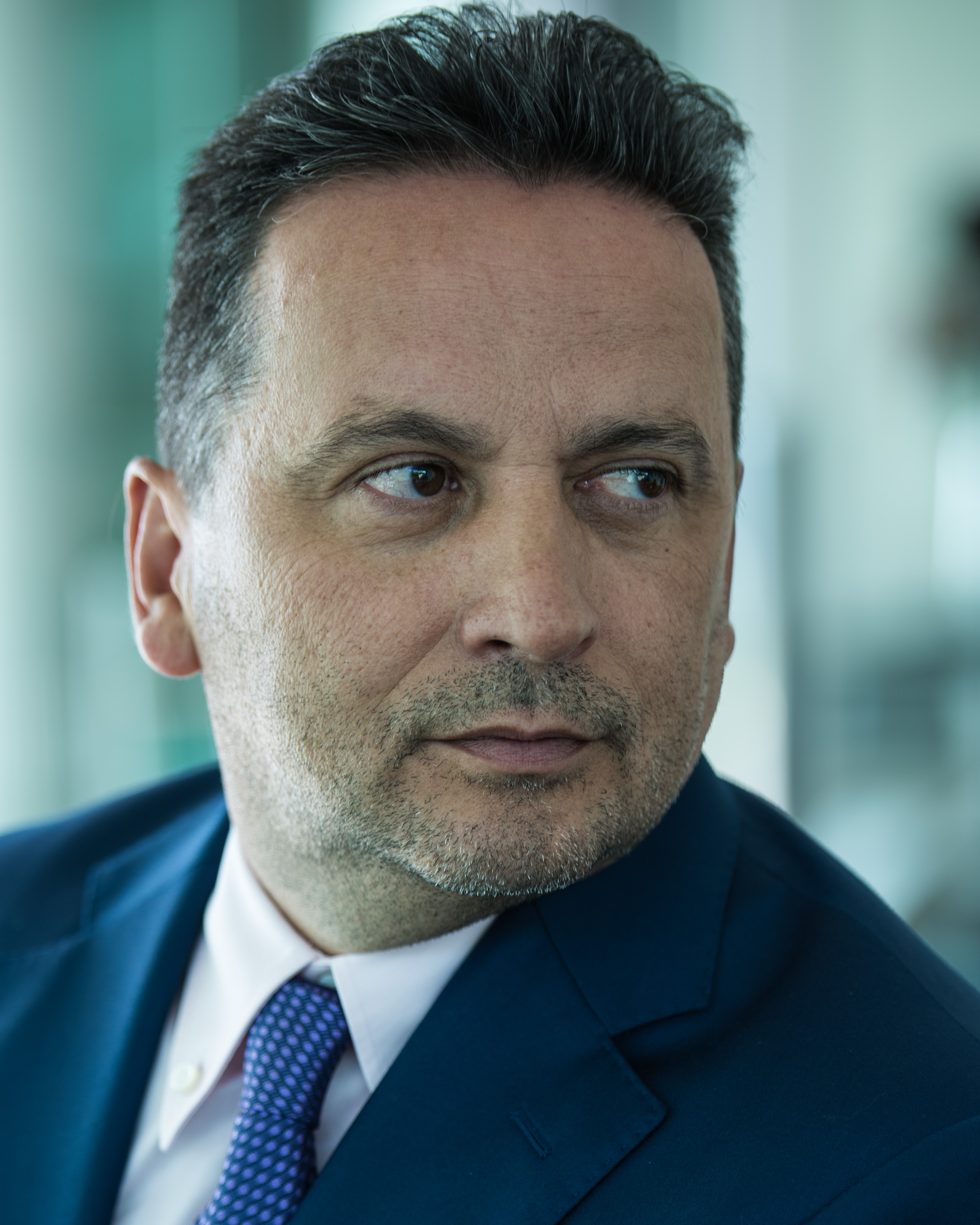
- Born: 14 May 1964 (age 62)

Claudio Cisullo (born May 14, 1964) is a Swiss serial entrepreneur and investor with Italian roots. He is founder and Chairman of his family office CC Trust Group AG and is also founder and Executive Chairman of the globally active procurement services provider Chain IQ Group AG. Claudio Cisullo ranks among the 300 wealthiest people in Switzerland.

== Education ==
Following a technical education, Claudio Cisullo completed various advanced trainings in business and administration at the University of St. Gallen.

== Career ==
Since 1984, Claudio Cisullo has founded a total of 26 companies in various business fields.

Claudio Cisullo is Chairman and owner of CC Trust Group AG, which he founded in 1997 as a family office and as an investment and management company. Their scope of activities includes private equity, corporate development, management, and consultancy, both in our home market and internationally.

In 2014, Cisullo founded Chain IQ Group AG and has since held the position of Executive Chairman.

He is the founder and Chairman of "The Circle", an international networking platform (club) for billionaires.

== Mandates ==
While directing the investment activities of CC Trust Group, Claudio Cisullo holds multiple mandates as strategy advisor and Board Member of several international organizations. He is a member of the Board of Directors of Ringier AG, one of the biggest European media companies, since 2013 and he is a member of the Foundation Board of the Law and Economics Foundation for the promotion of the degree of "Master in Law and Economics" at the University of St. Gallen. In 2017, he founded ACC Investments SRL and in 2019 ACC One Holding AG, two companies in property development and management, both of which he serves as Chairman. In May 2021, he was elected as Chairman of the Board of Directors of the Romanian award-winning, premium segment, green property developer One United Properties. Claudio Cisullo has been a shareholder and Member of the Board of Directors of One United Properties since 2020 and has recently become the third largest shareholder of the company.

Selected previous mandates

- Member of the Board of Directors of Swiss Entrepreneurs Foundation
- Member of the Board of Directors of the New York Center for Global Enterprise.
- Member of the Board of Directors of Ringier Axel Springer Schweiz AG
- Member of the Board of Directors of Admeira AG
- Chairman of the Commercial Advisory Board of the Laureus Foundation Switzerland
- Chairman of the Industrialization Advisory Board of UBS AG
- Member of the Board of the Sauber F1 Team
- Vice Chairman of the Board of Directors of Marquard Media AG
- Member of the Board of Trigram Global Macro Fund (Hong Kong)
- Member of the Board of Directors of Swisscom IT Services, a subsidiary of Swisscom
- Chairman of the Advisory Board of the International Alpine Symposium (Interlaken, Switzerland)
- Member of the Advisory Board of Swiss Post (Bern, Switzerland)
- Momber of the Board TM Transport & Management Holding Ltd.
- Member of the European Advisory Board of Hewlett Packard Europe
- Member of the Board of Corporate Express Holding USA (Denver) and Corporate Express Europe Holding Ltd. (Regensdorf, Switzerland)

== Private life ==
Claudio Cisullo was born in Switzerland in 1964 as the son of Italian immigrants. He is the father of three daughters.
