= Alamouti =

Alamouti (Persian: الموتی) is a Persian surname. Notable people with the surname include:

- Kaveh Alamouti (born 1954), British-Iranian investment banker
- Noureddin Alamouti, Iranian judge and politician
- Reza Alamouti, Iranian politician and activist
- Siavash Alamouti (born 1962), Iranian-American engineer
