= Yan Huo =

Chinese-born financier (born 1968)

- Born: 1968 (age 57–58); China
- Education: Fudan University; Princeton University
- Occupations: Co-founder, Capula Investment Management
- Spouse: Iris Huo

Yan Huo (Chinese: 霍焱) (born 1968) is a businessman and philanthropist. He is the managing partner and chief investment officer of Capula Investment Management.

== Early life and education ==
Yan was born in the Beijing in 1968. He received a bachelor's degree in physics from Fudan University and, in 1993, earned a PhD in electrical engineering from Princeton University.

== Career ==
After graduating from Princeton, Huo joined JPMorgan, where he worked in research before building and leading the firm's fixed-income proprietary trading team. In 2005, he co-founded London-based Capula Investment Management with Masao Asai.

In 2018, Huo earned £36.4 million, half of what he received in 2017. He is a trustee of Fudan University and Princeton University. In December 2023, he was elected to the board of the Metropolitan Museum of Art.

== Philanthropy ==
In 2009, Huo set up the Huo Family Foundation with a mission to support education, communities and the pursuit of knowledge. Recipients of donations have included The Old Vic theatre, the Tate gallery, the Royal National Theatre, the Natural History Museum and the London Symphony Orchestra. In 2022, the foundation gave grants of $7m to five London museums and galleries. The Foundation gave £4.3 million to recipients including the Royal Academy of Arts, the British Museum, the Royal Opera House and the National Gallery in 2024. Since its inception, the Foundation has pledged over $100m to charitable causes.

In December 2020 Huo became a signatory of the Giving Pledge, affirming his commitment to giving the majority of his wealth to charitable causes. In July 2025, Huo signed a joint letter published in The Telegraph ahead of the Giving and Impact Summit, urging the government to explore ways of simplifying the giving process, to encourage a culture of giving among emerging philanthropists.

From 2017 to June 2026, Huo was a trustee of Princeton University. He funded the Huo Pavilion, three galleries dedicated to Asian art, at the University's new Art Museum. In 2025, Huo was co-chair at the University's "Many Minds, Many Stripes" conference, an alumni event. On June 4, 2026, it was announced that Huo was the beneficiary behind a previously anonymous donation to found Princeton University's formerly-named New College West in 2022, which would now be named Huo College in his honor.

== Personal life ==
Huo donated £200,000 to the British Conservative Party during the 2019 United Kingdom general election. Huo donated £50,000 to the Conservative Party in 2020. According to The Times, Huo's net worth was £1.215 billion as of 2023.
