= Louis Bacon =

American hedge fund manager and billionaire (born 1956)

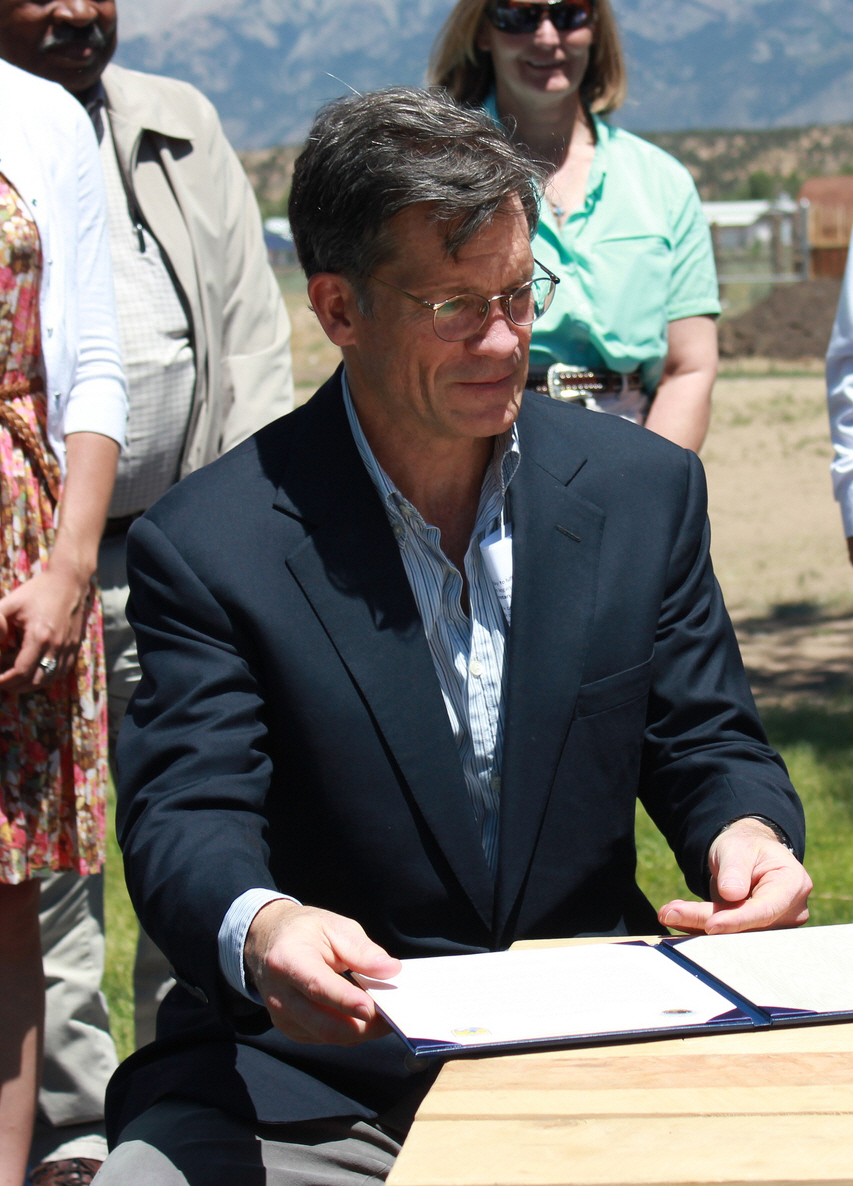
- Bacon in 2012
- Born: Louis Moore Bacon; July 25, 1956 (age 70); Raleigh, North Carolina, US
- Education: Middlebury College; Columbia University
- Occupation: Hedge fund manager
- Years active: 1989–
- Known for: Founder and CEO, Moore Capital Management
- Spouses: Cynthia Pigott (m. 1986; div. 2002) Gabrielle Sacconaghi (m. 2007; div. 2022) Sarah Woodhead Bacon (m. 2025)
- Children: 7

Louis Moore Bacon (born July 25, 1956) is an American investor, hedge fund manager, and philanthropist. He is the founder and chief executive of Moore Capital Management.

As of February 2024, Forbes estimated his net worth at US$1.5 billion.

== Early life ==
Bacon was born in Raleigh, North Carolina, on July 25, 1956. His father, Zachary Bacon Jr., founded real estate company Bacon & Co. and later led Prudential Financial’s and Merrill Lynch’s real estate efforts in North Carolina.

Bacon graduated from Episcopal High School in Alexandria, Virginia. He attended Middlebury College in Vermont where he received his BA in American literature, graduating in 1979. Bacon met Walter Frank while he was working on a fishing boat on Long Island. He was given a job clerking at the specialist firm Walter N. Frank & Co during the summers of his college years. He subsequently received his MBA degree in finance at Columbia Business School in 1981.

While at Columbia, Bacon traded commodities using a low interest loan he had received. During the first three semesters, he lost money and was forced to borrow money from his father to pay for necessities. He turned a profit during his fourth semester.

== Investment career ==
After receiving his MBA, Bacon joined the sales and trading program at Bankers Trust. Later he left the firm and returned to Walter N. Frank & Co. where he traded currencies. Bacon took a job on the floor of the New York Cotton Exchange, working as a "runner". Bacon later worked as a broker and trader of financial futures at Shearson Lehman Brothers and eventually became the senior vice president for their futures trading division.

In 1987 Bacon founded Remington Trading Partners. His market insights allowed him to profit during the market crash and subsequent rebound. In 1989, Bacon used his middle name when he founded Moore Capital Management LLC; in 1990 he founded Moore Global Investments, using $25,000 inherited from his family.

In 2006, Forbes magazine ranked Bacon as the 746th richest person in the world; in 2011 it ranked him as the 736th richest man. In 2010, the Denver Post reported that Bacon's net worth of $1.6 billion ranked him as the 238th richest American. In March 2010 Forbes Magazine estimated Bacon's net worth to be $1.5 billion, and ranked him as the 655th richest person in the world.

In December 2013, Bacon purchased Taos Ski Valley from the Blake family, who had owned it since 1954.

As of March 2022, Bacon holds a substantial interest in EV startup, Fisker Inc. with Bacon's Moore Capital Management holding 8.45 million Fisker shares.

== Lawsuits ==
=== Libel suit ===
In May 2011, Bacon obtained a court order in Great Britain, where he owned property, compelling the Wikimedia Foundation, WordPress and the Denver Post to reveal the identity of anonymous persons who allegedly defamed him on their websites. The court granted Bacon's application to serve a Norwich Pharmacal Order by email against these websites. Bacon sought the order so that he could launch defamation proceedings against online commenters he alleged to have posted libelous material about him on these websites.

In May 2011, the High Court in London granted Bacon a court order to obtain information from the Wikimedia Foundation, The Denver Post, and WordPress as to the identities of internet users alleged to have defamed him by their postings. Legal experts suggested compliance with the orders was unlikely, given the US tradition of freedom of speech, and the fact that US courts typically required "actual evidence or sufficient allegations of libel" before granting similar orders.

Legal experts did not believe the order was enforceable in the United States because of its policy related to freedom of speech. Initially, the Foundation agreed to give the information to Bacon's solicitors, but later said it would cooperate only with a court order in the U.S., saying "Please note that we do not comply with foreign subpoenas absent an immediate threat to life or limb." Automattic, which owns WordPress, said Bacon would need a court order but agreed to remove any defamatory material from its websites.

=== Peter Nygård lawsuits ===
He was in a legal dispute with Canadian fashion executive Peter Nygård for several years in regards starting with a dispute over their adjoining properties in The Bahamas. From 2007 onwards, the dispute escalated to include 16 legal actions between Nygård and Bacon and their associates. In 2005, Nygård installed a large concrete slab on Bacon's property and then Bacon sought and obtained a court injunction to remove it. In 2007, Bacon, installed industrial-grade speakers at the edge of his property and pointed them at Nygård's house. In the summer of 2010, Bacon's house was raided by Bahamian police, leading to the confiscation of the speakers. Bacon claimed it was the work of Nygård, who denied this.

In early 2019, it was reported that Nygård had filed a complaint with the U.S. Federal Court in Manhattan alleging that Bacon had violated sections of the Racketeer Influenced and Corrupt Organizations Act. Vanity Fair reported that Nygård also used fake news sites to smear Bacon. In January 2015, Bacon filed a defamation lawsuit against Nygård over these claims. A New York State Supreme Court judge awarded Bacon more than $203 million on May 5, 2023, in damages. The court order said that Nygård had conducted a global smear campaign over almost a decade, saying that it was “a deliberate plan by Nygård to personally and professionally destroy Bacon's reputation.” On November 7, 2024, the New York State Supreme Court Appellate Division, First Department, vacated the judgment entered against Nygård, citing improperly served court documents while Nygård was imprisoned for an unrelated felony. A state court judge in Manhattan ruled that Nygård had not provided any factual evidence to support his defaming statements against the plaintiff, on December 22, 2025, resolving the decade-long suit in favor of Bacon.

== Personal life ==
In 1986, Bacon married Cynthia Pigott, a former Newsweek magazine staff reporter. They divorced in 2002, after having had four children together.

In 2002, Bacon obtained Austrian citizenship, via a special provision for those who have made notable achievements for Austria. The decision was criticized, as no achievement by Bacon on behalf of Austria was then documented.

In 2007, he married Gabrielle Sacconaghi in Manhattan. They resided in Oyster Bay, New York. They divorced in 2022, after having three children together.

In November 2007, Bacon purchased the Trinchera Ranch in Costilla County, Colorado, from the Forbes family. The 171,400-acre (694 km^{2}) property sold for $175 million. In 2010, Bacon purchased the Orton Plantation in North Carolina, which was built in 1735 by an ancestor, Roger Moore, son of James Moore.

Bacon married Sarah Woodhead in March 2025. He has an older brother, Zack.

== Political and economic views ==
Bacon contributed £500,000 to Britain's Conservative Party between 2010 and 2016. Bacon also served as a fundraiser for American politician Mitt Romney, who was elected governor of Massachusetts and later ran for president. In 2015, Bacon donated $1 million to a Super PAC supporting the presidential candidacy of Jeb Bush.

== Wealth ==
In 1991, Bacon was 20th on the list of Financial World's Top 100 Wall Street Earners list.

== Philanthropy ==
In 1992, Bacon created The Moore Charitable Foundation (MCF) to provide financial support to nonprofit organizations that work to preserve and protect wildlife habitat and improve water systems. Bacon has donated more than one million dollars to the environmental non-profit organization Riverkeeper.

In June 2012, United States Secretary of Interior Ken Salazar and United States Fish and Wildlife Service Director Daniel M. Ashe announced Bacon intends to donate a conservation easement totaling approximately 90,000 acres in the Sangre de Cristo Mountains bordering the San Luis Valley in Colorado. This easement will provide the founding tract for the proposed new Sangre de Cristo Conservation Area.

Bacon owns the Trinchera Blanca Ranch located in the San Luis Valley. The Trinchera section of the ranch is currently protected by an easement administered by Colorado Open Lands. The new conservation easement Bacon intends to donate is to protect Blanca – thus protecting all 172,000 acres of land.

In addition to his work in Colorado, Bacon has helped preserve and protect environmentally sensitive land in New York, North Carolina, and the Bahamas. His key conservation projects include:

- Robins Island, Long Island, New York: After purchasing the "Jewel of the Peconic" in 1993, Bacon secured the permanent protection of the land through a conservation easement and set about restoring a natural habitat that had been deteriorating for 300 years.
- Cow Neck Farm, Long Island, New York: Bacon's Cow Neck Preserve, LLC purchased the farm in 1998 and donated a 540-acre conservation easement to the Peconic Land Trust, thus preventing development and ensuring the protection of the area's habitat.
- Lyford Cay, Bahamas: Bacon is involved with the environmental restoration of Lyford Cay.
- Chiriquí, Panama: Bacon opposes an industrial development in Chiriquí on Panama's Pacific coast, near the western city of David, where a controversial new port, Puerto Barú, has been proposed by Ocean Pacific Investments, backing an alternative site, Puerto Armuelles. At issue is the local ecosystem, since the proposed port site is amid the channels that house 25% of Panama’s mangrove forests, the dense roots of which fortify coastlines, shelter marine and coastal species, and extract significant carbon. Bacon's charitable foundation funded an impact analysis which estimated a $30 million toll over two decades on the local environment.

== Legacy and awards ==
In 2008, he was inducted into Institutional Investors Alpha's Hedge Fund Manager Hall of Fame.

He is the 2013 recipient of the Audubon Medal, given in recognition of outstanding achievement in the field of conservation and environmental protection. In 2016, Bacon received a Theodore Roosevelt Conservation Partnership's Lifetime Conservation Achievement Award for authorizing conservation easements on more than 210,600 acres in the US.
