= SPX Capital =

Brazilian investment firm

- Company type: Private
- Industry: Investment management
- Founded: 2010 (16 years ago)
- Founders: Rogério Xavier; Bruno Pandolfi; Daniel Schneider
- Headquarters: Rio de Janeiro, Brazil
- Key people: Rogério Xavier (Chairman)
- Products: Hedge funds Alternative investments
- AUM: US$12 billion (January 2024)
- Number of employees: 140 (2019)
- Website: spxcapital.com

SPX Capital (SPX) is a Brazilian investment management firm headquartered in Rio de Janeiro. It has a focus on global macro although it also has strategies in both traditional and alternative investment asset classes. It is one of the biggest independent fund managers in Brazil.

== History ==
SPX was co-founded in 2010 by former Banco BBM employees Rogério Xavier, Bruno Pandolfi and Daniel Schneider. The firm's name is an acronym formed from Schneider, Pandolfi and Xavier. The company initially focused on global macro strategies based on fundamental analysis which the three co-founders built during their time at Banco BBM. In 2012, another Banco BBM employee, Leonardo Linhares joined SPX to lead its equity strategies.

In February 2019, two managers left SPX, causing the market to speculate about the reason of departure.

In May 2021, The Carlyle Group entered a partnership agreement with SPX to enter the Brazilian market. Members of Carlyle's team would join SPX to establish its private equity strategy. It would become a subadvisor to Carlyle's $776 million buyout fund focused on South America. At the same time, It also entered a partnership agreement with Cyrela Commercial Properties to create a joint venture that would invest in real assets.

In November 2022, the SPX Raptor fund - a more aggressive version of the firm's flagship global macro fund, Nimitz reported a 11% loss. It had been the firm's best performing fund for the past two years and this was its first double-digit monthly loss since its inception in December 2010. Main contributors were rates and foreign currency bets. In July 2023, SPX apologized to its Raptor funholders as its perform for the first half of the year was 9.7% which was lower than all of its peers. Xavier stated it was caused by bullish bets on Brazil with Luiz Inácio Lula da Silva being elected. However the leader's rhetoric led to a sharp selloff in Brazil securities. However other SPX funds such as its equities strategy had a return of 12.8% in the same timeframe which was the best performance among its peers. Overall SPX had a return of 4.9% for the first half of 2023.

In February 2023, SPX, XP Inc. and several other asset management firms were appointed as committee members to represent Lojas Americanas bondholders after the company filed for bankruptcy, days after 20 billion reais ($3.9 billion) of "accounting inconsistencies" were discovered.

The company has expanded outside Brazil by setting up additional offices in other countries and has also diversified its investment strategies.
