= Kaveh Alamouti =

British-Iranian investment banker

- کاوه الموتی
- Born: 12 October 1954 (age 71)
- Education: Imperial College London (BSc); London Business School (MBA, PhD)
- Occupations: Trader, investment manager
- Employer(s): Salomon Brothers; Tokai Bank; Optimum Asset Management; Moore Capital Management; Citadel Asset Management Europe
- Known for: Founder of Optimum Asset Management

Kaveh Alamouti (Persian: کاوه الموتی; born 12 October 1954) is an Iranian-British trader. Alamouti holds a BSc in Engineering from the Imperial College London, and an MBA and a PhD in Finance from the London Business School, where he went on to serve as a member of the Faculty of Finance and Accounting.

In 1983 he joined Salomon Brothers.

Alamouti joined Tokai Bank in 1990 to establish an arbitrage group operating on a global basis. He was responsible for managing the overall risk and profitability of the Tokai Bank Europe Group in fixed income, foreign exchange, equities, credit spreads, and emerging markets. There he served as Senior Managing Director of the Tokai Bank Europe and Head of Trading for the Tokai Bank Europe Group.

Alamouti established Optimum Asset Management in November 1999 to engage in asset management on a global basis. Following this, he was a Trader and Portfolio Manager at Moore Capital Management.

Between 2008 and 2014, Alamouti served as the Chief Executive Officer at Citadel Asset Management Europe.
