= Highfields Capital Management =

Hedge fund firm

Highfields Capital Management LP
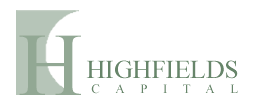
- Company type: Limited Partnership
- Industry: Hedge funds
- Founded: June 15, 1998; 27 years ago
- Headquarters: Boston, Massachusetts, U.S.
- AUM: US$12.1 billion (2018)
- Website: www.highfieldscapital.com

Highfields Capital Management LP is a hedge fund founded in 1998 which had assets of $12.1 billion in 2018. The annualized net returns during the firm's first 20 years were more than 10%.

== Business ==
Richard Grubman and Jonathon Jacobson met at an investment lunch in New York City in the early ‘90s and started a friendship. In 1998, they opened Highfields Capital Management LP together in Boston, Massachusetts.

Highfields has invested in publicly traded equities and private companies like Harry & David, Michaels, Genworth Financial, Microsoft and SLM Corporation; and other investments including reinsurance sidecars. Grubman and Jacobson gained attention and a large payoff when they bet against Enron before the 2001 bankruptcy. In February 2012, Highfields called for management change at CoreLogic, in which it had a 7.65% stake.

In 2010, Highfields was listed as having $10 billion of assets on January 1, 2010, 30th in The Hedge Fund Journal Top 50, up from $9.3 billion on July 1, 2009 and up from a 38th-place ranking in 2008.

In 2013, Highfields returned $2 billion to clients. As Jacobson wrote to investors, "we would rather be slightly smaller and generate better [returns]."

In October of 2018, Highfields announced in a letter that they would return all outside capital and would convert into a family office. In a third quarter letter to investors, Jacobson wrote, “Done correctly, money management is an all-consuming, 24/7 pursuit… After three-and-a-half decades of sitting in front of a screen, I realized I am ready for a change."

Over the 20 years between 1998 and 2018, Highfields only lost money in two years: 2002 and 2008.

== Senior management ==
Richard Grubman and Jonathon Jacobson co-founded Highfields Capital Management LP in 1998.

Grubman retired in August 2010; Jacobson remains a principal of the firm.

Jacobson is an undergraduate alumnus of Wharton School in finance and has an MBA from Harvard Business School. After working as an options trader and at Merrill Lynch and Lehman Brothers, he joined Harvard Management Company in 1990. In 1998 Jacobson left HMC to co-found Highfields with a third of the fund's initial $1.5 billion under management coming from HMC. Bloomberg reported in 2011 that Harvard Management Company no longer invested with Highfields.
