= Baker Brothers Advisors =

New York Hedge Fund

Baker Bros. Advisors LP
- Trade name: Baker Brothers Investments
- Company type: Private
- Industry: Investment management
- Founded: 2000; 26 years ago
- Founders: Felix Baker; Julian Baker
- Headquarters: New York City, U.S.
- AUM: US$22 billion (March 2024)
- Number of employees: 52 (March 2024)

Baker Brothers Advisors (BBA) is an American hedge fund management firm headquartered in New York. Despite its secretive nature, the firm is a leading biotechnology investor and manages over $20 billion in assets under management (AUM).

== Background ==
BBA was founded in 2000 by brothers Felix and Julian Baker. Their father is Keith Michael Baker, a history professor at Stanford University. Felix graduated from Stanford University with a B.S. in Biology, got a PhD in immunology and completed two years of medical school while Julian graduated from Harvard University with a B.A. in Social studies and then worked in the private equity arm of Credit Suisse First Boston. In 1994, the brothers started managing health care investments for the Laurence Tisch's family who owned the Loews Corporation before creating their own standalone business.

The brothers maintained close ties to the Tisch family and until 2017, the BBA office was in the 667 Madison Avenue skyscraper which was the same one as the Loews Corporation.

Since its inception, BBA has been noted for its secrecy. It has no website and the brothers avoid the press as well as refusal to respond to phone calls for comments on their strategy.

== Investment strategy ==
BBA focuses on the biotechnology sector and been noted for its strong returns. Yale University’s charitable foundation had $274 million invested with BBA in 2009 and by 2016 it rose to $1.08 billion, a combination of new money and profits of $393 million. In October 2019, BBA's investment value in two weeks increased by $1.4 billion due to Seagen and BeiGene. In August 2024, The Wall Street Journal reported that BBA's 25% stake investment in Seagen in 2003 resulted in a windfall gain of $8 billion when in 2023, Pfizer acquired Seagen for $43 billion which was considered one of the largest return on capital investments in the industry. Most of those gains were returned back to investors because it didn't see enough opportunities to deploy all that money at once.

BBA's success has been built on advances in the science of genetics, rise in biotechnology stocks and a period of dealmaking as large biopharmaceutical companies acquire up smaller innovators. BBA relies on talented executives and scientists which are often discovered at companies it invests in and frequently end up on the board of directors in other companies in BBA's portfolio. As of 2019, BBA's top 20 disclosed public company investments eight have at least one board member who are BBA employees. Chief executives for 7 of those 20 companies also serve as board members for other companies that are BBA investments. Some welcome BBA's influence such as Eve Slater who has stated the representatives are "very scientifically driven" and "active". Others are more critical of BBA's influence such as RA Capital Management who felt BBA's influence in a now-rejected deal to merge BioCryst Pharmaceuticals with Idera Pharmaceuticals significantly favoured BBA at the expense of other shareholders.
