= Statar Capital =

Investment management firm

- Industry: Finance
- Founded: September 2018
- Founder: Ron Ozer
- Headquarters: Miami, United States
- Products: Investment management
- AUM: $3.5 billion (2023)
- Website: www.statarcapital.com

Statar Capital is a Miami-based American macro investment management firm founded in 2018 by Ron Ozer. The firm focuses on directional and relative-value trades, with an emphasis on natural gas commodities.

== History ==
Statar Capital was formed in September 2018 by American investor and asset manager Ron Ozer, a former Citadel portfolio manager who had specialized in natural gas commodities. The firm launched with approximately $140 million in capital raised, primarily from family offices and institutional clients. Between September 2018 and December 2019, the firm gained 42% in value and grew to over $410 million in assets under management as one of the few remaining natural gas-focused hedge funds in the United States.

By the end of 2020, Statar reportedly managed over $1.2 billion in assets. The following year, the firm was able to leverage natural gas market volatility to profit over $400 million, increasing its value to over $2 billion.

In May 2022, Bloomberg reported the value of Statar’s managed assets as having risen to $2.8 billion, reflecting 332% net returns since its launch. As of July 2023, the firm reported an AUM of nearly $3.5 billion.
