= Vazan =

Vazan may refer to:

== People ==
- Bill Vazan (born 1933), Canadian artist
- Hila Vazan (born 1980), Israeli journalist and politician
- Michal Važan, Slovak ice hockey player

== Places ==
- Vazan, Iran, a village in Razavi Khorasan Province, Iran

== See also ==
- Vasan (disambiguation)
