= Virtus Investment Partners =

Asset Management Firm

Virtus Investment Partners, Inc.
- Type: Public company
- Traded as: NYSE: VRTS; Russell 2000 component; S&P 600 component
- Industry: Asset Management
- Founded: November 1, 1995
- Headquarters: Hartford, Connecticut, U.S.
- Key people: George R. Aylward, President and CEO; Timothy A. Holt, Chairman of the Board
- Products: Virtus mutual funds; closed-end funds; retail separate accounts; exchange-traded funds; institutional investment management services
- AUM: $168.9 billion (March 31, 2021)
- Number of employees: 581 (December 31, 2020)
- Website: virtus.com

Virtus Investment Partners, Inc. is an American company which operates as a multi-manager asset management business, comprising a number of individual affiliated managers, each having its own investment process and brand, and the services of unaffiliated sub advisers.

== History ==
Virtus Investment Partners, formerly known as Phoenix Investment Partners, Ltd., was formed on November 1, 1995, through a reverse merger with Duff & Phelps Investment Management Co., at the time the investment management affiliate of Duff & Phelps Corporation.

=== 1995–2006 ===
From 1995 to 2001, Virtus was a majority-owned indirect subsidiary of Phoenix Life Insurance Co. During this period, the company purchased a majority interest in several boutique investment management companies to establish its multi-manager business model. In addition to Duff & Phelps Investment Management, Virtus’ affiliates during this time included Kayne Anderson Rudnick Investment Management, LLC, Seneca Capital Management, and Zweig Advisers LLC, which was founded by Martin Zweig, a well-known Wall Street investor.

On January 11, 2001, a subsidiary of Phoenix acquired the outstanding shares of Phoenix Investment Partners not already owned, and the company became an indirect wholly owned subsidiary of Phoenix.

In May 2005, Phoenix Investment Partners acquired the remaining minority interest in Seneca Capital Management and in September of that year acquired the remaining minority interest in Kayne Anderson Rudnick, thereby increasing ownership of both companies to 100%. In May 2006, Phoenix Investment Partners adopted the Harris Insight Funds from Harris Investment Management, Inc.

=== 2006–2009 ===
In February 2008, Phoenix announced it would spin off Phoenix Investment Partners as an independent asset management company through a pro rata dividend of Phoenix Investment Partners' common stock to Phoenix's shareholders. On October 30, 2008, Harris Bankcorp Inc., a U.S. subsidiary of Bank of Montreal, announced it would acquire $45 million in convertible preferred stock, representing a 23 percent equity position in Virtus.

Virtus became an independent publicly traded company on December 31, 2008, upon completion of its spin-off from Phoenix. The first day of trading of VRTS was January 2, 2009, and company officials rang the opening bell at NASDAQ Market Site on January 5, 2009.

=== 2010–present ===
The years 2011 through 2018 were a period of expansion for Virtus as it established or acquired several affiliated managers, beginning in June 2011, when it established Newfleet Asset Management as a fixed income affiliate with approximately $5.2 billion of assets under management. David L. Albrycht, formerly executive managing director of Goodwin Capital Advisors, an investment management company that previously was a subsidiary of Virtus, became chief investment officer of Newfleet.

In October 2012, Virtus completed the acquisition of Rampart Investment Management, a registered investment adviser specializing in options strategies. In 2013, the company established a Dublin-based UCITS, and in 2015 acquired a majority interest in ETF Issuer Solutions (ETFis), a New York City-based company that operates a platform for listing, operating, and distributing exchange-traded funds. It was renamed Virtus ETF Solutions.

In December 2016, Virtus agreed to acquire multi-boutique asset manager RidgeWorth Investments from private equity firm Lightyear Capital and Ridgeworth's employees for $472 million. That transaction, which was completed in June 2017, added approximately $40 billion in assets managed by Ridgeworth's three wholly owned affiliates, Ceredex Value Advisors, Seix Investment Advisors, and Silvant Capital Management.

Virtus completed a majority investment in Sustainable Growth Advisers (SGA), an investment manager headquartered in Stamford, Connecticut that specializes in high-conviction U.S. and global growth equity portfolios, in July 2018.

Natixis Investment Managers agreed to sell AlphaSimplex Group to Virtus in October 2022. The acquisition completed in April 2023.

== Business overview ==
Retail products (available to individual investors) include open-end mutual funds, closed-end funds, exchange-traded funds, and retail separate accounts. The Virtus Mutual Funds family consists of 58 open-end mutual funds that are distributed primarily through intermediaries, including national and regional broker-dealers, independent broker-dealers, and independent financial advisory firms. Virtus' closed-end funds are managed by four affiliated managers. The closed-end funds trade on the New York Stock Exchange.

Retail separately managed accounts comprise intermediary programs, sponsored and distributed by unaffiliated brokerage firms, and private client accounts, which are offered to the high-net-worth clients of the affiliated managers.

Virtus also manages institutional accounts for corporations, multi-employer retirement funds, foundations, endowments, and special purpose funds.

=== Unaffiliated sub advisers ===
Virtus supplements the investment capabilities of its affiliated managers with select unaffiliated sub advisers whose strategies are not available to retail mutual fund customers.
