= Pete Muller (businessman and singer-songwriter) =

American businessman and singer-songwriter

- Born: 1963 (age 62–63)
- Education: Princeton University
- Occupations: Hedge fund manager, singer-songwriter
- Known for: Founder of PDT Partners
- Spouse: Jillian Muller

Pete Muller is an American investor, singer-songwriter, and philanthropist. He is a hedge fund manager and quantitative trader who founded PDT Partners in 1993 as part of Morgan Stanley's trading division, which spun out as an independent business in 2012. He was described by Bloomberg.com as an "unlikely executive", a math wizard, and a person with diverse intellectual interests and hobbies.

As a singer-songwriter, Muller recorded and released six studio albums. His original song, "San Diego (When You Coming Home)", achieved No. 27 on the Billboard Adult Contemporary Chart in March 2020. In September of that same year, his single "God and Democracy" also reached the Billboard Adult Contemporary Top 30.

== Early life and education ==
Muller was raised in Wayne, New Jersey, with his sister. His parents were both immigrants to the United States; his Austrian-born father was an engineer and his mother, a native of Brazil, was a practicing psychiatrist.

Muller graduated in mathematics with honors from Princeton University in 1985, where he also played Ultimate Frisbee and was a member of the Colonial Club.

== Business career ==
Muller began his career working at Barra Inc. in 1985, a financial analytics firm in Berkeley, California. He joined Morgan Stanley in 1992.

Muller founded PDT (Process Driven Trading) Partners inside Morgan Stanley in 1993 and is the CEO. PDT has offices in New York City and London and has returned 20% on average annually through 2010. PDT was spun out of Morgan Stanley in 2013 and as of 2019, had over $6 billion in assets under management. In 2019, Forbes reported that Muller earned around $150 million in the previous year, making its list of the highest-earning hedge fund managers for 2018.

== Musical career ==
He is a singer, songwriter and pianist. Muller tours regularly and has made appearances at music events such as Montreux Jazz Festival in Switzerland, the Jazz Open in Stuttgart, Germany, and the Telluride Jazz Festival. In the early stages of his music career, Muller played the electronic keyboard in New York City Subway.

Muller has recently opened for artists such as Lisa Loeb, Livingston Taylor, and Howie Day. He performed at the 2024 Folk Alliance conference and will appear at the 2024 Philadelphia Folk Festival.

In 2019, Muller released his fourth studio album, Dissolve, produced by Rob Mathes. It was featured in American Songwriter and People magazine. "San Diego (When You Coming Home)", from that album, reached No. 27 on the Billboard Adult Contemporary Chart. His single "God and Democracy" was a Top 30 hit on the Billboard Adult Contemporary Chart in the summer of 2020.

In 2022, Muller released his fifth solo album, Spaces, via Two Truths Records. The album was produced by collaborator Rob Mathes, who also worked on Dissolve.

In 2024, Muller released his sixth solo album, More Time. Recorded in Memphis with producer/engineer Matt Ross-Spang (Jason Isbell, Margo Price), the title track's video was directed by Gus Black who previously helmed clips from Phoebe Bridgers and Sheryl Crow. The band assembled for the album's recording sessions includes bassist Dave Smith (Al Green, Wilson Pickett), Texas guitarist Will Sexton (Joe Ely, Roky Erickson), Memphis organist Rick Steff (Lucero, Cat Power), longtime Wilco drummer Ken Coomer.

== Philanthropy ==
Muller is a founding board member of Live Music Society and Math for America, and a Berklee College of Music trustee. In September 2017, with the support of the New York City Mayor's Office of Media and Entertainment and the Economic Development Corporation, Muller with Berklee acquired Avatar Studios, which was later rebranded as Power Station at BerkleeNYC.

== Personal life ==
Muller and his wife Jillian have two children. He writes crossword puzzles for the New York Times periodically. He also co-writes daily mini-meta puzzles featured in The Washington Post. In 1998, Muller made the final table of the $3,000 Limit Hold 'em event at the World Series of Poker and came in 4th at the World Poker Challenge. He also practices vinyasa yoga, snowboards, and surfs.
