= Andrew Lo =

Taiwanese-American economist (born 1960)

- 羅聞全
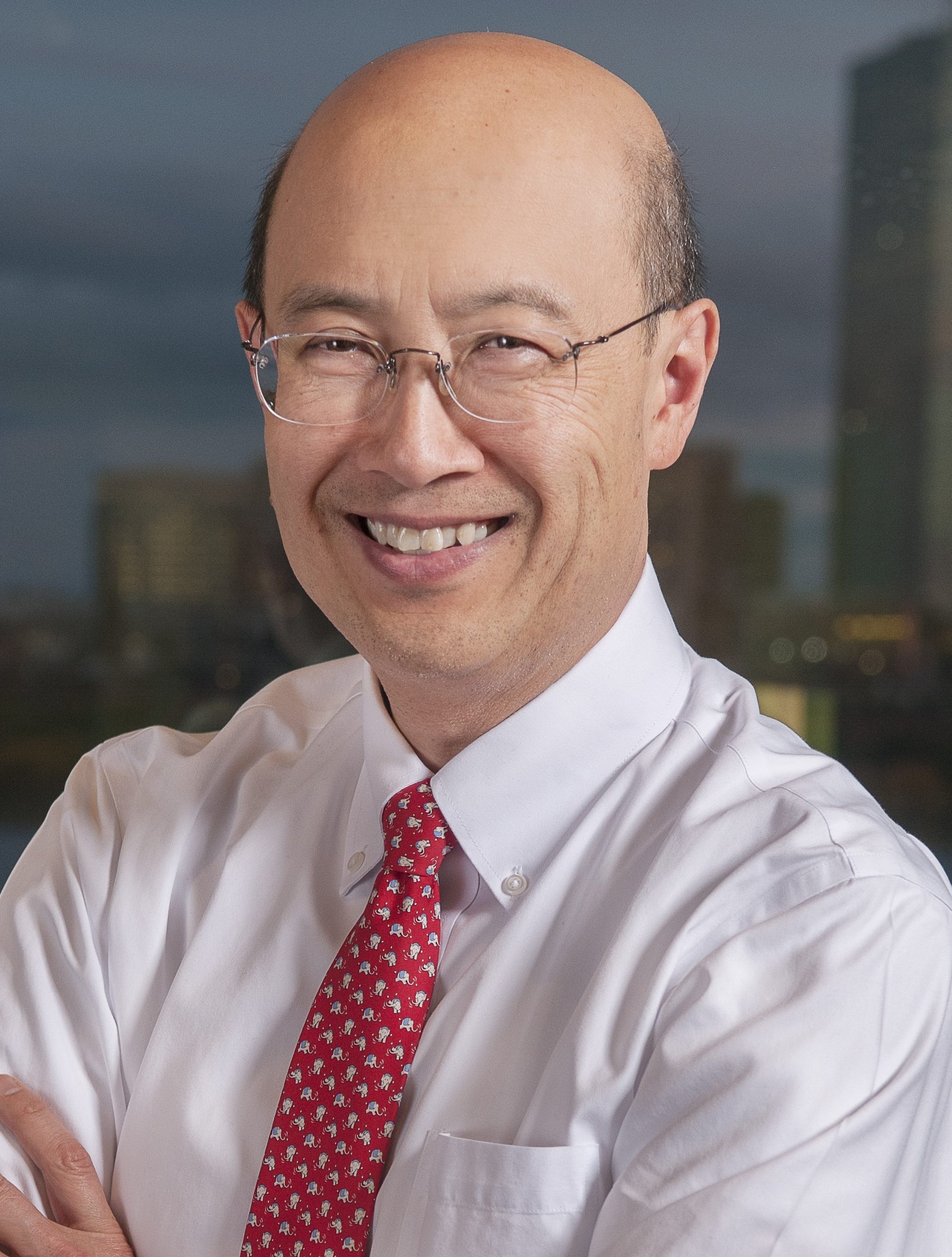
- Lo in 2018
- Born: 1960 (age 65–66); Hong Kong
- Education: Yale University (BA); Harvard University (MA, PhD)
- Known for: Founding AlphaSimplex Group
- Awards: American Association for Individual Investors Award; Graham and Dodd Award
- Scientific career
- Fields: Economics
- Workplaces: Massachusetts Institute of Technology; Academia Sinica
- Thesis: Essays in Financial and Quantitative Economics (1984)
- Doctoral advisor: Andrew Abel; Jerry A. Hausman
- Website: alo.mit.edu

Andrew Wen-Chuan Lo (Chinese: 羅聞全; born 1960) is a Hong Kong-born Taiwanese-American economist and academic who is the Charles E. and Susan T. Harris Professor of Finance at the MIT Sloan School of Management. Lo is the author of many academic articles in finance and financial economics. He founded AlphaSimplex Group in 1999 and served as chairman and chief investment strategist until 2018 when he transitioned to his current role as chairman emeritus and senior advisor.

== Life and career ==
Lo was born in 1960 in Hong Kong and was raised in Taiwan. He and his family lived in Taiwan before immigrating to the United States when Lo was five years old. Raised by a single mother, Lo graduated from the Bronx High School of Science in 1977. He then studied economics at Yale University, graduating in 1980 with a Bachelor of Arts. He then did doctoral study in economics at Harvard University, receiving a Master of Arts and a Ph.D. in 1984.

Lo is a professor of finance at the MIT Sloan School of Management, the director of MIT's Laboratory for Financial Engineering, a principal investigator at MIT's Computer Science and Artificial Intelligence Laboratory, an affiliated faculty of the MIT Department of Electrical Engineering and Computer Science, an external faculty member of the Santa Fe Institute, and a research associate of the National Bureau of Economic Research. He previously taught at the University of Pennsylvania's Wharton School from 1984 to 1988 as an assistant and associate professor of finance before joining the Sloan School of Management faculty in 1988.

He is the founder of AlphaSimplex Group, a quantitative investment management company based in Cambridge, Massachusetts, and served as its chairman and chief investment strategist until 2018 when he transitioned to his current role as chairman emeritus and senior advisor. AlphaSimplex specializes in quantitative global macro and global tactical asset allocation strategies, beta-replication products, and absolute-return risk analytics.

Lo presented a paper in 2004 at a National Bureau of Economic Research conference, warning of "the rising systematic risk to financial markets and particularly focused on the potential liquidity, leverage and counterparty risk from hedge funds." He testified in 2008 before the Committee on Oversight and Government Reform and the Committee on Financial Services of the U.S. House of Representatives on hedge funds, systemic risk, and the 2008 financial crisis. With Lars Peter Hansen, Lo co-directed the Macro Financial Modeling project at the Becker Friedman Institute, a network of macroeconomists working to develop improved models of the linkages between the financial and real sectors of the economy in the wake of the 2008 financial crisis.

Lo was a founding co-editor of the Annual Review of Financial Economics, serving from 2009 to 2021. He serves on the Board of Directors of Annual Reviews. Lo is an advisor to the Journal of Investment Management and The Journal of Portfolio Management. He is also a director of Roivant Sciences.

== Awards ==
His awards include Batterymarch, Guggenheim, and Sloan fellowships; the Paul A. Samuelson Award; the Eugene Fama Prize; the IAFE-SunGard Financial Engineer of the Year award; the Global Association of Risk Professionals' Risk Manager of the Year award; the Harry M. Markowitz Award; the Managed Futures Pinnacle Achievement Award; one of Time magazine's "100 most influential people in the world"; and awards for teaching excellence from both Wharton and MIT. His most recent book, Adaptive Markets: Financial Evolution at the Speed of Thought, has also received a number of awards. Lo is a fellow of Academia Sinica, the American Academy of Arts and Sciences, the Econometric Society, and the Society of Financial Econometrics. In 2023, he was elected a Fellow of the American Finance Association.

== Publications ==
- Adaptive Markets: Financial Evolution at the Speed of Thought. Princeton University Press. 2017. ISBN 978-0691135144.
- Lo, Andrew Wen-Chuan (2005). Dynamics of the Hedge Fund Industry. ISBN 0-943205-72-7.
- Hedge Funds: An Analytic Perspective. Princeton, NJ: Princeton University Press. 2008. ISBN 978-0-691-13294-5.
- International Library of Financial Econometrics. Vol. I–V. Cheltenham, UK: Edward Elgar Publishing Ltd. 2007.
- with MacKinlay, A. Craig (1999). A Non-Random Walk Down Wall Street. Princeton, NJ: Princeton University Press. ISBN 0-691-09256-7.
- Lo, Andrew Wen-Chuan (1997). Market Efficiency: Stock Market Behaviour in Theory and Practice. ISBN 1-85898-161-1.
- with Campbell, John Y.; MacKinlay, A. Craig (1997). The Econometrics of Financial Markets. Princeton, NJ: Princeton University Press. ISBN 0-691-04301-9.
- Market Efficiency: Stock Market Behaviour In Theory and Practice. Vol. I and II. Cheltenham, UK: Edward Elgar Publishing Ltd. 1997.
- The Industrial Organization and Regulation of the Securities Industry. Chicago: University of Chicago Press. 1995. ISBN 0-226-48847-0.
- with Hasanhodzic, Jasmina (2009-01-07). The Heretics of Finance: Conversations with Leading Practitioners of Technical Analysis. Bloomberg Press. ISBN 978-1-57660-316-1.
