= Jeffrey Talpins =

American hedge fund manager

- Occupations: Hedge Fund Founder and Chief Investment Officer
- Known for: Founder of Element Capital Management
- Spouse: Mara Marcus Talpins

Jeffrey Marc Talpins is the founder and Chief Investment Officer of New York-based hedge fund, Element Capital Management and specialized in macro investing.

Talpins founded the fund in 2005 at Proxima Alfa Investments USA LLC as Element Capital Group and then spun out into an independent firm in 2009. Element is one of the world’s largest hedge funds dedicated to macro investing with approximately $17.5 billion in assets under management and a 21% annualized return since inception, as of August 2018. By December 2018, the firm was described as a "heavyweight," managing $18.2 billion."

== Early life and education ==
=== Education ===
Talpins graduated from Yale University in 1997 with a Bachelor of Science (Summa Cum Laude and Phi Beta Kappa) with Distinction in Economics and Applied Mathematics (focus in Finance).

=== Career ===
Talpins worked in the Mortgage Backed Securities Department at Goldman Sachs, and later at Citigroup's Fixed Income Options as the Head Trader, credited with expanding this business. Talpins was recruited by Ravi Mehra and Robert Sleutz of Vega Asset Management under the Vega Plus Partners platform to set up his own fund where he launched Element Capital with Vega's seed capital and infrastructure.

He launched Element Capital in 2005 with $250 million.

== Philanthropy ==
Talpins is a member of the Board of Trustees of Harlem Children’s Zone (HCZ), which helps disadvantaged children and families living in Harlem. He also sits on the board of the American Prairie Foundation, which is dedicated to creating the largest nature reserve in the continental United States. Talpin supports Jewish organizations including the Larchmont Temple, the Jewish Federation of Northern New Jersey, the United Jewish Appeal Federation of New York, and the Atalef Foundation, the official association of the Israeli Naval Commandos Unit. In April 2021, the Jeffrey M. Talpins Foundation partnered with the Atlantic Council's Middle East Programs to launch the Abraham Dialogues, a project to improve relations between Israel and neighboring Arab countries.

== Personal life ==
Talpins is married to Mara Marcus. They have two children, and live in New York, with a second home in Montana.
