= Keith Michael Baker =

British-born historian

Keith Michael Baker (born 7 August 1938) is a British-born historian.

Baker received his bachelor's and master's degrees at Peterhouse, Cambridge, and completed a doctorate at University College London. He began his academic career in the United States as a history instructor at Reed College and joined the University of Chicago faculty in 1965. While at Chicago, Baker was awarded a Guggenheim Fellowship in 1978. He left Chicago for Stanford University in 1988, the same year the government of France named him a Knight of the Order of Academic Palms. Baker was elected to membership of the American Academy of Arts and Sciences and American Philosophical Society in 1991 and 1997 respectively. He served as president of the American Society for Eighteenth-Century Studies in 2000. At Stanford, Baker has held the J. E. Wallace Sterling Professorship in the Humanities as well as the Anthony P. Meier Family Professorship in the Humanities. He was one of three recipients of the American Historical Association's 2014 Award for Scholarly Distinction. He released Jean-Paul Marat: Prophet of Terror in 2025.

Baker was co-editor of The Journal of Modern History between 1980 and 1989, and has served on the editorial boards of History of European Ideas (2007–2012), French Historical Studies (1976–1979), and Ethics (1979–1980).

Baker is the father of Felix and Julian Baker, the accomplished biotech investors behind Baker Brothers Advisors.
