= SPARX Group =

Japanese holding company

SPARX Group Co., Ltd.
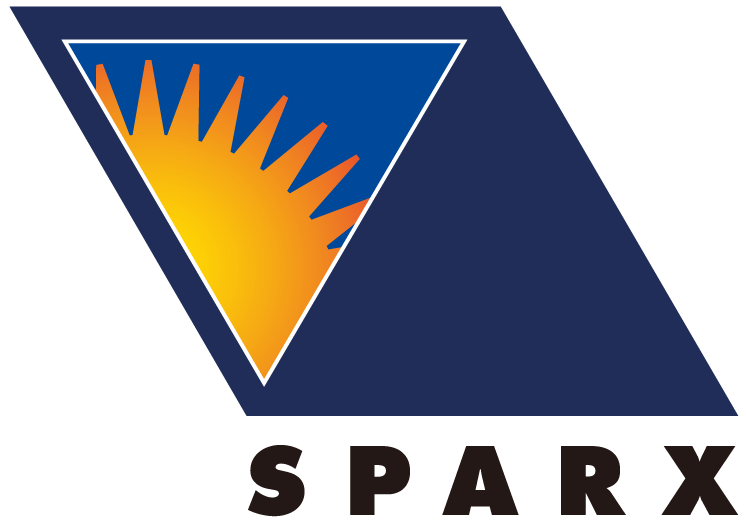
- Native name: スパークス・グループ株式会社
- Company type: Public
- Traded as: TYO: 8739
- Industry: Investment Management
- Founded: July 1, 1989; 36 years ago
- Headquarters: Kōnan, Minato-ku, Tokyo, Japan
- Key people: Shuhei Abe (President and Group CEO)
- Revenue: ▲¥14.71 billion (31 March 2022)
- Operating income: ▲¥6.57 billion (31 March 2022)
- Net income: ▲¥4.07 billion (31 March 2022)
- AUM: ¥1.5 trillion (31 March 2021)
- Total assets: ▼¥37.14 billion (31 March 2022)
- Total equity: ▲¥24.32 billion (31 March 2022)
- Number of employees: 173 (31 March 2022)
- Website: www.sparxgroup.com

SPARX Group is a group of companies led by SPARX Group Co., Ltd as a holding company and is active in the investment and real estate business.

== Background ==
SPARX Asset Management Co., Ltd was established on 1 July 1989.

On 2 December 2001, it listed on the JASDAQ.

On 1 October 2006, SPARX Asset Management Co., Ltd changed its name to SPARX Group Co., Ltd.

Apart from the holding company, the group consists of:

- SPARX Asset Management Co., Ltd.
- SPARX Green Energy & Technology Co., Ltd.
- SPARX Asset Trust & Management Co., Ltd.
- SPARX AI & Technologies Investment Co., Ltd.
- SPARX Innovation for Future Co., Ltd.
- SPARX Asset Management Korea Co., Ltd.
- SPARX Asia Investment Advisors Limited

SPARX plans to create the Mirai Renewable Energy Fund with Toyota, which aims to invest in the construction of solar, wind, biomass and geothermal power plants.
