= Philip Vasan =

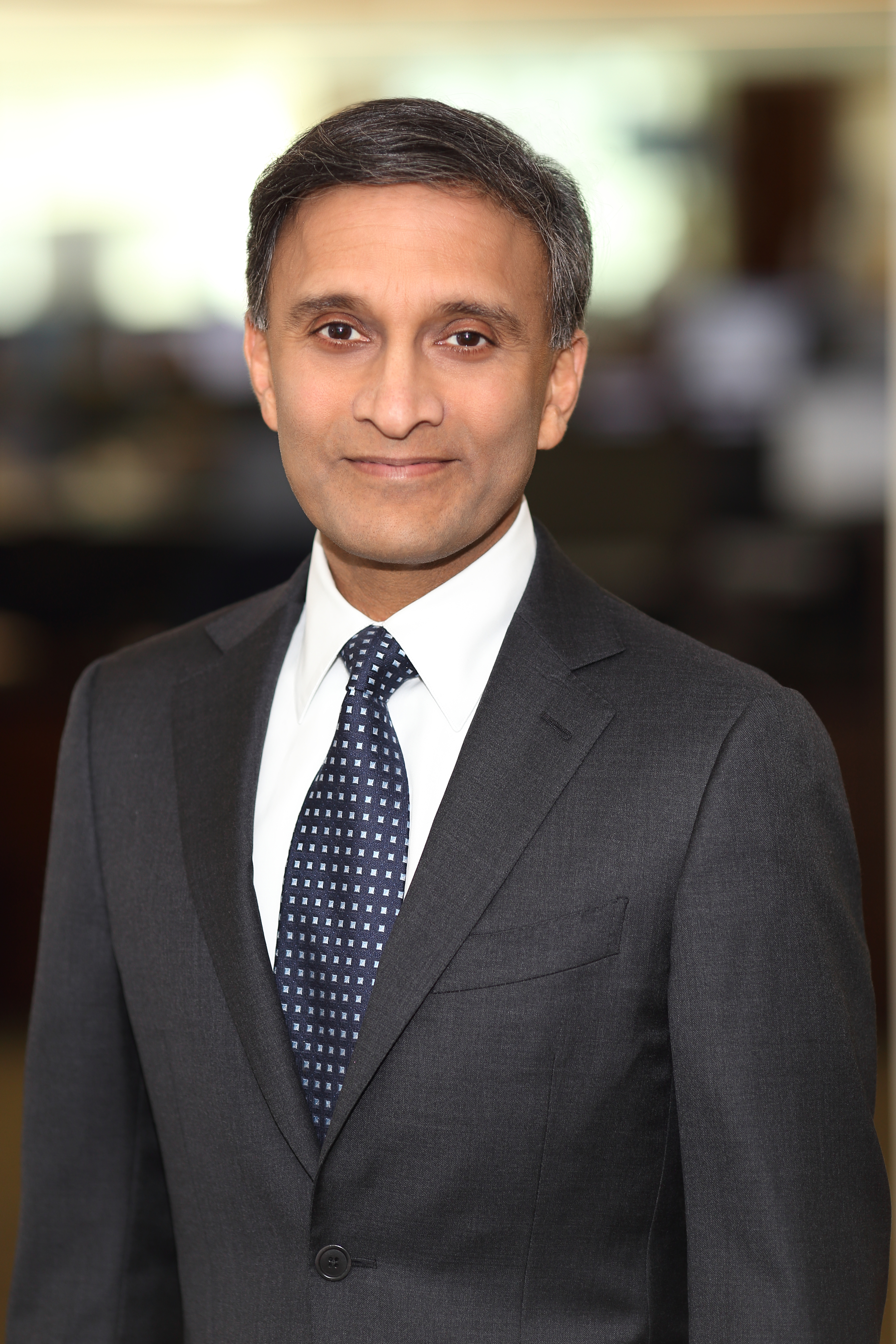
- Philip Vasan in 2016
- Born: Philip Vasan
- Education: Oberlin College (B.A. with High Honors); Harvard University (Ph.D. in Economics)
- Occupation: Co-Head of Fundamental Equity Investing

Philip Vasan is Co-Head of Fundamental Equity Investing for BlackRock, Inc and the Deputy Head of the Portfolio Management Group. He joined BlackRock in 2016 and was the head of their Investments and Portfolio Solutions for BlackRock U.S. Wealth Advisory from 2016 to 2019. Previously, he was the CEO of the Private Bank of Credit Suisse in the Americas from 2013 until 2016. He also became a member of the global Management Committee of the Private Bank in that year.

== Early life and education ==
Vasan was born in New York City and graduated from Oberlin College with his BA in 1980. He received his PhD in Economics from Harvard University in 1986.

== Career ==
Vasan became the Co-Head of Fundamental Equity Investing for BlackRock, Inc in February 2023 and the Deputy Head of PMG in July 2020.

He previously held the position of Global Head of Lending and Liquidity as well as the Head of Investments and Portfolio Solutions at BlackRock, Inc. On July 12, 2016 it was announced that Vasan was hired by BlackRock, the world’s largest asset manager, to develop BlackRock products and new portfolios for private banks and independent wealth advisers.

Prior to this, he was with the Credit Suisse bank from 1992 until 2016. Between 2006 and 2010, Vasan created a technology platform and strategy that drew many of the biggest hedge funds in the industry. In 2010 Vasan's investment unit reported $2 billion of Credit Suisse's investment banking revenue. That same year, Credit Suisse was ranked as the world's second largest prime broker by Hedge Fund Intelligence. During his tenure as CEO of the Private Bank for North America and Latin America, he sponsored the Forbes 400 Summit on Philanthropy in 2013. Vasan turned the US business to profitability, after which it was sold to Wells Fargo.

He also developed Credit Suisse’s Prime Service franchise during the ten years between 2003 and 2013. The franchise ranked a top-2 market position.

In partnership with Professor Andrew Lo of MIT, and Pankaj Patel of Credit Suisse, Vasan launched the first passive and investible Equity 130/30 index.

ProShares Large Cap Core Plus that track the performance of the Credit Suisse 130/30 Large Cap Index (CSM). Outperformed the S&P 500 since its inception more than 10 years ago (4/21/08). Has outperformed the S&P 500 in 82% of rolling three-year periods since inception (4/21/08) through 12/31/20.

In his Prime Services position, he was a frequent speaker on markets and on industry developments. Vasan was recognized for having promoted the multi-prime model for hedge funds before that became mainstream. Under Vasan, Prime Services became known for being the top prime broker to a select client base. Vasan was named one of the 50 most influential people in hedge funds in 2010 by HFM Week.

From 2002 to 2003 he was the worldwide head of Equity Derivatives and Convertibles, Program Trading, and Proprietary Trading. From 2000 to 2001 Vasan was the head of e-Commerce technology and investments. From 1996 to 2000 he was the Head of Global Foreign Exchange. In that role, Vasan and the heads of Foreign Exchange from other major banks launched FXall, the market’s first online FX trading platform for institutional clients. FXall was subsequently bought by Thomson Reuters.

Prior to this, from 1992 until 1996, Vasan developed and ran Credit Suisse’s FX derivatives business globally.

Before joining Credit Suisse, he worked for Citibank, trading interest rate and currency derivatives before running their FX options business in the US.

== Board memberships and honors ==
Vasan was a visiting lecturer in finance at the MIT Sloan School of Management in 1998. He is also a former director of the Managed Funds Association. He is a member of the Board of Trustees and the Investment Committee of Oberlin College and he is on the Board of Trustees at The East Harlem School.

== Family life ==
Vasan is married and has two children.
