= Jain Global =

Hedge fund based in New York City

Jain Global LLC
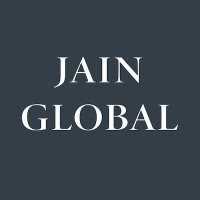
- Company type: Private
- Industry: Investment management
- Founded: July 2023; 2 years ago
- Founder: Bobby Jain
- Headquarters: New York City, New York, U.S.
- Key people: Bobby Jain (CEO & CIO)
- Products: Hedge funds Alternative investments Quantitative finance
- AUM: US$5.3 billion (July 1, 2024)
- Number of employees: 400 (May 2026)
- Website: www.jainglobal.com

Jain Global is an American investment management firm headquartered in New York City with additional offices in Europe and Asia–Pacific. As of April 2026, Jain Global has returned all outside capital and invests exclusively for Millennium Management.

== Background ==
Bobby Jain was the co-chief investment officer of Millennium Management and was speculated to be Israel Englander's successor. However this was not the case and in June 2023, Jain left Millennium Management to found his own firm, Jain Global. Jain had an agreement with Millennium Management not to solicit any of its clients until the next year.

Jain Global drew comparisons to ExodusPoint Capital Management, another hedge fund also set up by former Millennium Management senior employees under similar circumstances. ExodusPoint Capital Management had the largest launch in history for a hedge fund and Jain Global was speculated to have a $10 billion launch that would surpass it.

To attract clients for fundraising, Jain Global offered discounted fees. In January 2024, Jain Global stated to investors that those who commit at least $250 million that month will pay performance fees of just 10% which was down from 18% in 2023. Investors that invested between $100 million to $250 million would pay performance fees of 13% and those who invested less than $100 million would pay performance fees of 15%. It also offered an annual redemption right for every investor where after the 18 months the firm starts trading, investors would be able to get their cash back within a year. However the'll pay performance fee increase of 3% and a 5% redemption fee on the capital they're withdrawing.

However, despite incentives, Jain Global fell short of its original $8–10 billion fundraising target. In January 2024, Jain told clients that the firm would be aiming to raise $5–6 billion and would launch in July of that year.

To prepare for its launch, Jain Global went on a hiring spree poaching staff from peers like Citadel LLC, Balyasny Asset Management and Brevan Howard as well as large investment banks. While the firm had multiple strategies, its main strategy would be in fundamental equities. Jain Global also set up offices in Europe and Asia–Pacific. Its Asia–Pacific operations would operate as a separate business unit and would pursue different strategies compared to the other offices.

On July 1, 2024, Jain Global officially launched and started trading. It launched with $5.3 billion making it the biggest launch since ExodusPoint Capital Management in 2018. It raised funds via a drawdown fund with investors including Abu Dhabi Investment Authority, Goldman Sachs, HSBC, Morgan Stanley and UBS. At launch, the firm had 215 employees of which 42 were portfolio managers that would trade in six strategies. Its strategy allocation was 30% in Fundamental Equity, 20% in Equity Arbitrage, 20% in Commodities, 15% in Rates and Macro, 12% in Quant and 12% in Credit.

On April 27, 2026, Jain Global pivoted to only managing money for Jain's former employer, Millennium Management and would return around $6 billion of outside capital to investors.

== See also ==
- ExodusPoint Capital Management
- Millennium Management
