= Journal of Investment Management =

Finance journal

- Language: English
- Edited by: Gifford H. Fong

Publication details
- History: 2003-present
- Publisher: Stallion Press
- Frequency: Quarterly
- Open access: no
- Impact factor: 0.38 (2016)

Standard abbreviations
- ISO 4: J. Invest. Manag.

Indexing
- ISSN: 1545-9144

Links
- Journal homepage; Journal website; Online archive

The Journal of Investment Management (JOIM) is a quarterly refereed journal which seeks to be a nexus of theory and practice of investment management. The Journal of Investment Management offers in-depth research with practical significance utilising concepts from the economics and accounting disciplines. The editor is Gifford H. Fong, founder of Gifford Fong Associates, a boutique bond and equity analysis firm.

The journal is published by Stallion Press and has an ISSN of 1545–9144.
