= Element Capital Management =

American hedge fund

Element Capital Management LLC
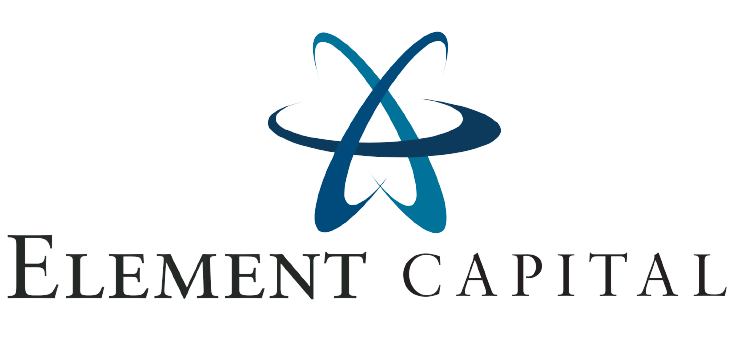
- Company type: Private
- Industry: Investment Management
- Founded: April 2005; 21 years ago
- Founder: Jeffrey Talpins
- Headquarters: New York City, New York, U.S.
- Products: Hedge fund
- AUM: US$3 billion (as of January 21, 2025)
- Number of employees: 66 (2025)
- Website: elementcapital.com

Element Capital Management is an American hedge fund using a global macroeconomic investment strategy, founded in 2005 by Jeffrey Talpins.

== Company overview ==
Element Capital is headquartered in New York City. In 2015, the company opened an office in Mayfair, London.

In April 2017, Harvard University became a client of Element Capital, an early decision by the endowment’s then-new chief, N.P. “Narv” Narvekar. Other investors included the John D. and Catherine T. MacArthur Foundation, the Teachers Retirement System of Texas, and the Alaska Permanent Fund.

The fund is almost always closed to new investments in order to remain an optimal size. The last time the fund opened to new capital was in mid-2018. It attracted $3 billion, mostly from existing clients, in just one month.

In December 2018 The Wall Street Journal reported the fund had quietly become a “heavyweight,” managing $50 billion+.

In January 2020, in order to continue prioritizing performance over asset-gathering, the fund proactively reduced its AUM by 20%.

In early 2021, Element Capital returned about $2 billion of 2020 profits to its clients in order to maintain control of the growth of the fund, focusing on performance rather than accumulating assets.

In 2024, Element Capital returned more than $6 billion to investors, shrinking its asset base and moving closer to managing mostly internal capital. This move is part of Element’s strategy to reduce the number of outside investors. The firm has shifted toward managing a smaller asset base with the goal of generating higher returns, following three consecutive years of losses that saw the fund lose about 20% between 2021 and 2023. The fund delivered a return of 22.5% in 2024.

== Investment strategy ==
The fund uses a global macroeconomic strategy, trading based on political and economic trends, rather than the fundamental analysis of individual companies. Talpins uses options to try to capture growth from strategies aimed at predicting global economic shifts while also limiting potential losses from those strategies.

== Performance ==
Since launching in 2005 the fund averaged 21% annual returns, as of March 2019, with no down years. During the global financial crises of 2008, the fund returned 35%, and in 2009 it gained 79%.

== Key people ==
Jeffrey Talpins is the founder of Element and its chief investment officer since the fund launched in April 2005.

In 2012, Adam Prestandrea joined Element Capital, stepping down as co-head of investments at Arpad Busson’s EIM SA.

In October 2019, the company hired Colin Teichholtz, former Blue Mountain Capital fixed-income head, to research macro investment strategies and policy developments as part of the portfolio team.

In September 2021, Element hired former member of the Bank of England's rate-setting Monetary Policy Committee, Gertjan Vlieghe, as its chief economist.
