= Hometown International =

Former American deli operator

Hometown International (Expert Market: HWIN) was an American holding company, best known for operating Your Hometown Deli, a delicatessen in Paulsboro, New Jersey. It attracted attention in 2021 for having a market capitalization of over US$100 million despite the deli having annual sales of only about $25,000. The company changed its name to Makamer Holdings after merging with Makamer, a bioplastics startup, although the stock continues to trade as Hometown International, Inc. The deli closed on June 19, 2022.

A former chairman and others associated with the company were charged in September 2022 in relation to their work for Hometown International with conspiracy to commit securities fraud, securities fraud, conspiracy to manipulate securities prices, and other offenses.

== Stock market listing ==
When Hometown intended to go public in 2015, the U.S. Securities and Exchange Commission (SEC) had warned Hometown that it believed that the company was a shell company. Hometown's leadership objected, stating that it was operating a delicatessen and that it was investing in food preparation and service.

In a letter to clients published in April 2021, hedge fund manager David Einhorn remarked that retail investors were at risk from inflated valuations of publicly traded companies. Hometown International, whose stock had started trading in 2019, had sales of only $35,748 in the past two years combined, yet it had a market capitalization of over $100 million. Einhorn wrote, "The largest shareholder is also the CEO/CFO/Treasurer and a Director, who also happens to be the wrestling coach of the high school next door to the deli. The pastrami must be amazing."

On April 22, 2021, the OTC Markets Group delisted Hometown's stock from its OTCQB market "for not complying with the rules" and marked it as CE, for caveat emptor. The OTC placed a skull and crossbones icon next to Hometown's stock symbol as a warning that investors should exercise care before investing in a stock marked CE.

== Corporate governance ==
James Patten proposed the creation of an umbrella corporation called Hometown to his friend Paul Morina, the principal of Paulsboro High School and head coach of its wrestling team. Morina owned 19% of Hometown's outstanding shares in April 2021, making his stake worth $20.5 million on paper. Morina was Hometown's CEO, CFO, and treasurer; he was not compensated for his work in these roles. The only other employee of the holding company was Christine Lindenmuth, a math teacher at Paulsboro High School who did not own any shares of Hometown. Lindenmuth served as vice president and secretary of Hometown International, which did not pay her any compensation. According to an SEC filing dated May 12, 2021, shareholders of Hometown International voted to fire Morina and Lindenmuth. The filing did not indicate a reason for why shareholders called for the vote.

Peter Coker Jr., based in Hong Kong, was chairman of Hometown International. His father, Peter Coker Sr., was a major shareholder in Hometown. The elder Coker and several of his associates have been accused of and sued for many crimes, including fraud, campaign finance violations, and prostitution. In June 2021, New York magazine's Intelligencer blog noted that Hometown's disclosures reveal "an incestuous web of connections across various shell companies, or quasi-shell companies, with little to no revenue". For example, in February 2021, Hometown had lent $150,000 to an unsuccessful vacation company whose investors also included Peter Coker Sr.

== Food offerings ==
After Einhorn's letter to investors spread widely, several journalists visited Your Hometown Deli to evaluate its food. The New Yorker enlisted Ron Ferreira, a 40-year veteran of the Italian food industry in New Jersey, to evaluate four of Your Hometown Deli's sandwiches. Ferreira gave them largely positive reviews. At a time when Hometown International's market cap was about $2 billion, Ferreira estimated that the deli was worth no more than $50,000. Ben Gilbert of Insider visited the deli at about 2:00 PM on a Tuesday, when he was the only customer. Gilbert bought a cheesesteak and praised its quality and its low price, although he noted that the deli's building "looks more suited for a VFW outpost than a food establishment". A senior reporter at Philadelphia magazine found that the food was a good value for its cost, although he felt that the location was unremarkable. When he was visiting, four police officers were outside the deli to deter journalists and photographers from accosting customers.

== Merger ==
On March 31, 2022, Hometown International announced that it would merge with Makamer, a bioplastics start-up based in Los Angeles. The merged company is called Makamer Holdings. Although Hometown's market cap was $109.2 million at the time of the merger, a CNBC reporter wrote that it "is not likely, at all, that the shareholders will receive the current value of the share price". Prior to the merger, the last two trading days for Hometown with any nonzero volume had been March 8, 2022, and December 31, 2021, each with a volume of 100 shares.

Your Hometown Deli closed on June 19, 2022. Makamer Holdings sold its inventory on July 1 and sold the deli business on August 9, according to a regulatory filing. As of August 22, its phone number was not in service.

== Criminal charges ==
On September 26, 2022, federal authorities announced 12 criminal charges against James Patten, Peter Coker Sr., and Peter Coker Jr., related to their work for Hometown International and another corporation, E-Waste Corp. The charges include conspiracy to commit securities fraud, securities fraud, and conspiracy to manipulate securities prices. Patten was also charged with wire fraud, money laundering, and securities manipulation. Patten and the elder Coker were arrested and appeared in a North Carolina court where they pleaded not guilty. The younger Coker was arrested in Thalang district, Phuket province, Thailand on January 11, 2023.

James Patten pleaded guilty to securities fraud and conspiracy to commit securities fraud on December 20, 2023. On July 21, 2026, he was sentenced to 21 months in prison.

The Cokers pleaded guilty on December 19, 2024. The elder Coker was sentenced to six months in jail, six months of home confinement, a $500,000 fine, and up to $644,000 in restitution. He was released from a prison in Butner, North Carolina, in November 2025, to a reentry facility, which he is scheduled to exit on December 8, 2025. Coker's son was sentenced to 40 months in prison; including credit for time served in a Thai prison and an Essex County, New Jersey jail, he would be imprisoned for about 12 months. The younger Coker renounced his U.S. citizenship in 2019 and is now a citizen of Saint Kitts and Nevis; one day after his release from prison on October 15, 2025, he was deported. Catherine O'Hearn, the judge who sentenced the Cokers, wrote an order on November 24, 2025, in which she noted that the defendants had not paid any of the $5.56 million in restitution that they had been ordered to pay, "despite having substantial liquid assets at the time the sentence was imposed".
