= BFAM Partners =

Hong Kong investment firm

- Company type: Private
- Industry: Hedge fund
- Founded: April 2012; 14 years ago
- Founder: Benjamin Fuchs
- Headquarters: Tin Hau, Hong Kong
- AUM: US$1.2 billion (February 2023)
- Number of employees: 70+ (September 2022)
- Website: www.bfam-partners.com

BFAM Partners (BFAM) is a hedge fund management firm based in Hong Kong. The firm focuses on investments in China and is known for investing in high-yield property debt as well as distressed securities.

== Background ==
BFAM was founded in April 2012 by Benjamin Fuchs, who previously led the Global Opportunities Group proprietary trading desk at Nomura Holdings. The firm launched its multi-strategy hedge fund in on 1 June 2012, with Nomura being one of its backers.

In its first year, the firm had a return of 31.6%, largely due to its bets on the Chinese bond markets.

BFAM profited during the 2015–2016 Chinese stock market turbulence by betting against a sudden yuan devaluation.

In January 2016, BFAM and Farallon Capital were involved in a debt restructuring of Chinese property developer Kaisa after it defaulted on $2.5 billion of corporate bonds in the previous year.

In June 2016, BFAM sold credit default swaps on Noble Group, which was undergoing financial distress after it was accused of accounting fraud. In 2018, BFAM became one of its owners after its debt restructuring.

In December 2016, Bloomberg News reported that BFAM was one of the top performing hedge funds in Asia that year, largely due to its transactions related to Kaisa and Noble Group.

According to Bloomberg News, from 2012 to 2021, BFAM had positive returns each year with an annualized return of 12.5%. At its peak in May 2021, BFAM held $5 billion in assets under management and had 99 employees. 2021 was the first year in which BFAM achieved a negative return, primarily due to the 2020–2022 Chinese property sector crisis. The firm had invested a significant amount of capital in Chinese real estate developer bonds, expecting the Chinese Government to provide more support to the sector. As a result, BFAM posted a loss of 11% for 2021 and a loss of 26% for 2022. During this period, the firm also experienced withdrawals from investors as well as actively reduced staff to rightsize the firm.

In response to the crisis, BFAM ringfenced hard-to-sell China credit assets into a side pocket to avoid a fire sale and give the issuers time to recover. BFAM would also shift focus to more liquid investments such as equities, currencies, convertible bonds and block trades. In addition, BFAM aimed to have less assets under management, with a target of $1.5 billion to $2 billion.

In the fall of 2022, BFAM opened an office in London for employees seeking to leave Hong Kong due to its COVID-19 restrictions. In June 2023, BFAM shut down the office as Hong Kong had lifted its COVID-19 restrictions. BFAM also had an office in New York which was closed in 2022.

In February 2023, Bloomberg News reported that BFAM posted a return of 7.5% for the month, citing an improved market environment due to factors such as the end of the COVID-19 lockdown in China and the Chinese government providing more support to the property sector.

In April 2023, BFAM, Davidson Kempner Capital Management and several other investors filed a lawsuit in New York against Chinese property developer Glory Health, alleging that it owed $201 million in debt repayment and had failed to honor its agreement.
