= ExodusPoint Capital Management =

Hedge fund based in New York City

ExodusPoint Capital Management, LP
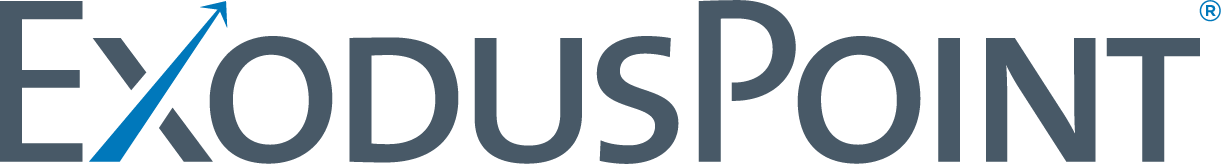
- Company type: Private
- Industry: Investment management
- Founded: April 2017; 9 years ago
- Founders: Michael Gelband; Hyung Lee
- Headquarters: Park Avenue Tower, New York City, New York, U.S.
- Products: Hedge funds Alternative investments Quantitative finance
- AUM: US$12 billion (January 1, 2024)
- Number of employees: 646 (January 1, 2024)
- Website: www.exoduspoint.com

ExodusPoint Capital Management (ExodusPoint) is an American investment management firm headquartered in New York City with additional offices in Europe and Asia. It currently holds the largest launch in history for hedge funds where it raised $8.5 billion in 2018 after it started accepting capital from external investors.

== Background ==
In early 2017, ExodusPoint was founded by Michael Gelband and Hyung Lee. Both of them were previously employees at Millennium Management where Gelband was Head of Fixed income while Lee was Head of Equities. Gelband was once seen as the heir to Israel Englander but after he was declined an ownership stake in the firm, he left to start ExodusPoint. Several employees from Millennium Management also left to join the new firm. Shortly after, Millennium Management filed an arbitration case against Gelband to stop him from poaching staff from it. Although the results were not made public, it is believed that Gelband won the lawsuit and was able to take staff from Millennium Management to establish his firm.

In 2018, ExodusPoint started accepting capital from external investors. In June of that year, it launched with $8.5 billion in capital, making it the largest start-up hedge fund in history. Instead of charging the standard management fee, ExodusPoint will pass on unlimited costs to investors. These fees are expected to be "substantial" over time, making it more expensive than its peers.

Since launching, ExodusPoint has expanded rapidly by quickly increasing its headcount and opening new offices. In October 2018, Schonfeld Strategic Advisors sued ExodusPoint to stop it from poaching its employees. ExodusPoint eventually won the lawsuit.

Despite having a strong debut, ExodusPoint's performance initially lagged its peers; however, the firm has since rebounded and delivered competitive returns. In 2019, ExodusPoint had a return of 6.8% compared to the Hedge Fund average of 9%. In 2022, ExodusPoint had a return of 5.5% to 6% which was lower than its peers including Millennium Management which had over double the return at 12.4%. However, ExodusPoint's fixed-income performance was strong in 2022, accounting for the bulk of the firm’s profits.

ExodusPoint returned 11.3% in 2024, its best result since 2020, when it gained 13.5%. The firm achieved its best year on record in 2025, returning 18% and outperforming many of its peers.

One of the main reasons for its early performance was the under-performance of its equities business, despite the large investments placed into them. ExodusPoint’s core business is fixed income, which accounts for 75% of the firm’s risk.

Since its launch, ExodusPoint has only performed fundraising once in the spring of 2020 when it raised $3 billion. In 2023, investors withdrew $1 billion from ExodusPoint. The firm’s AUM as of December 2025 was approximately $12 billion.

Early on, the firm experienced some staff turnover and several senior executives left the firm. ExodusPoint made several new hires in 2023 and has remained strategic about how it expands.

== See also ==
- Jain Global
- Millennium Management
