= Scipion Capital =

- Company type: Private
- Founded: 2007
- Founder: Nicolas Clavel
- Headquarters: 15 Half Moon Street, London, United Kingdom
- Net income: $19.8b

Scipion Capital is a London-based hedge fund, specializing in private debt. It is located at 15 Half Moon Street in Mayfair, London. It was founded by Nicolas Clavel in 2007.

== Investments ==
Scipion Capital launched its first fund, the Scipion African Opportunities Fund, in 2007, to provide commodity trade finance. It offers short-term loans for the delivery, production and processing of non-perishable commodities.

The Scipion Active Trading Fund was set up in 2010 as a lending platform to facilitate the allocation of different investments between Sub-Participants, Co-Investors and Funds managed by Scipion Capital Ltd.

In 2017, the Scipion Term Loan Fund was established by Nicolas Clavel to provide asset-backed loans to emerging markets. The Fund participates in 1-5 year loans, financing physical assets generating US Dollar revenue streams.

Scipion Active Impact Fund was established in 2018 as Scipion Capital's responsible investing offering. The fund considers environmental, social and impact criteria when making investment decisions.
