= Quantedge =

Singaporean hedge fund management firm

Quantedge Capital Pte. Ltd.
- Type: Private
- Industry: Investment management
- Founded: May 2006; 20 years ago
- Founder: Leow Kah Shin; Chua Choong Tze
- Headquarters: Singapore
- Number of locations: 2
- Key people: Suhaimi Zainul-Abidin (CEO)
- AUM: US$7.2 billion (July 2026)
- Number of employees: More than 130 (July 2026)
- Website: www.quantedge.com

Quantedge Capital Pte. Ltd. is a Singaporean hedge fund management firm founded in 2006 by Leow Kah Shin and Chua Choong Tze. Headquartered in Singapore with an office in New York City, it manages the Quantedge Global Fund, a systematic global macro fund that invests across equities, bonds, currencies, commodities and insurance-linked securities. It is licensed by the Monetary Authority of Singapore to conduct fund management.

The fund surpassed US$1 billion in assets under management in 2014, and Bloomberg reported that the firm managed US$7.2 billion by July 2026. In 2017, Bloomberg ranked it first by year-to-date performance among quantitative funds managing more than US$1 billion. In August 2026, eFinancialCareers reported that the fund had returned nearly 20 per cent a year on average since its October 2006 launch. The fund has historically targeted annualised volatility of roughly 25 to 30 per cent, substantially above the level accepted by many institutional hedge-fund investors.

== History ==
Quantedge Capital was founded in May 2006 by Leow and Chua. Leow had worked as a reinsurance pricing actuary, while Chua held a doctorate in statistics and taught portfolio management at Singapore Management University. Before establishing the firm, they managed money for themselves, relatives and friends.

The Quantedge Global Fund began trading in October 2006 with about US$3 million. Its assets exceeded US$1 billion in June 2014, when Bloomberg described it as the best-performing Asia-based macro hedge fund tracked by Eurekahedge over the period then measured. Assets exceeded US$2 billion by the end of 2019.

Suhaimi Zainul-Abidin joined Quantedge in 2013 after working as a banking and finance lawyer. He became chief executive in 2018, while Leow and Chua moved from their roles as co-chief executives to become co-heads of research. By 2020 the firm operated offices in Singapore and New York.

Bloomberg reported that Quantedge's assets under management increased from more than US$2 billion at the end of 2019 to US$7.2 billion in July 2026.

== Investment strategy and risk management ==
Financial publications classify the Quantedge Global Fund as a systematic global-macro fund. It uses quantitative models to take positions across global equity, bond, currency and commodity markets. Quantedge describes the strategy as including both directional and market-neutral positions.

In a 2012 interview, Chua said the firm's models and backtests determined both the direction and size of positions, using inputs that included historical returns and market liquidity. He said the portfolio was resized daily to remain within a risk budget and that the models reduced positions as market volatility increased. The firm's mandate permitted gearing, although Chua declined to disclose the amount then used.

Quantedge describes its investment philosophy as seeking returns from risk premia across a large number of independent positions. The firm has said that its models respond to changes in prices and volatility rather than forecasts of particular political or economic events. In 2026, eFinancialCareers reported that the fund traded approximately 300 markets, including about 50 commodity markets. Zainul-Abidin said that spreading positions across this universe reduced idiosyncratic risk and permitted the fund to accept more risk in individual positions.

The strategy has historically accepted greater volatility than many hedge funds. Bloomberg reported a target annualised volatility of approximately 25 per cent in 2011. By 2019 the reported target was about 30 per cent, which The Business Times and Bloomberg contrasted with the lower volatility commonly sought by large institutional investors.

Quantedge includes insurance-linked securities in the fund's investment universe. In a 2017 speech, Monetary Authority of Singapore deputy chairman Lim Hng Kiang identified Quantedge as one of the Singapore-based fund managers exploring allocations to catastrophe bonds.

== Fund structure and liquidity ==
In 2018, Quantedge told investors that they would have to move from monthly liquidity to share classes with fixed terms of three or five years. In April 2020, Bloomberg reported that 82 per cent of the fund's assets were committed for at least three years.

== Investment performance ==
Bloomberg's reports on the fund have identified investor newsletters and statements supplied by Quantedge as the sources of its performance figures.

The fund lost 22.6 per cent during the 2008 financial crisis. It subsequently gained 82.4 per cent in 2010 and 32.3 per cent in 2011. In 2014 it gained 29.4 per cent, making it the best-performing Asia-based macro fund tracked by Eurekahedge that year.

After losing 18.3 per cent in 2015, the fund gained 24 per cent in the first quarter of 2016 and finished 2016 up 27 per cent. Through July 2017 it gained a further 21 per cent, compared with a 1.5 per cent decline in the HFRI Macro Systematic Diversified Index over the same period.

The fund declined 29 per cent in 2018 and gained 70.5 per cent in 2019. During the market disruption in March 2020, it lost an estimated 28.8 per cent, its largest monthly decline since inception and its third monthly loss greater than 20 per cent, after October 2008 and June 2013.

In July 2026 the fund gained nearly 8 per cent, taking its year-to-date return through July to 34.6 per cent. eFinancialCareers separately reported that the fund had returned nearly 20 per cent a year on average since inception.

Annual Net Returns (%)
2006	2007	2008	2009	2010	2011	2012	2013	2014	2015	2016	2017	2018	2019	2020	2021	2022	2023	2024	2025	2026 (YTD)
36%	19%	-23%	47%	82%	33%	39%	9%	29%	-18%	27%	38%	-29%	70%	7%	20%	-21%	30%	31%	15%	34.6%

Source: Bloomberg,Hedgeweek, eFinancialCareers, Stega Capital. Notes: 2006 returns are measured from October inception. 2026 figure reflects YTD performance through July 2026.

== Philanthropy ==
The principals of Quantedge Capital began organised giving through a donor-advised fund in 2011 and established Quantedge Foundation (Singapore), a separately incorporated charitable organisation, in 2015. The foundation became a Singapore Institution of a Public Character in 2016. In January 2026, The Straits Times reported that the foundation had donated more than S$30 million to social-mobility initiatives in Singapore during its first decade.
