= Atlantic Investment Management =

Global alternative investment firm

- Type: Independent Investment Advisory Firm
- Industry: Global Investment Management
- Founded: 1988
- Headquarters: 1301 Avenue of the Americas, 38th Floor, New York, NY 10019; United States
- Area served: Worldwide
- Key people: Alexander J. Roepers, Founder, President and Portfolio Manager
- AUM: US$ 1.9 billion (as of August 2021)
- Website: www.atlanticinvestment.net

Atlantic Investment Management is a global alternative investment firm founded in 1988 by Alexander J. Roepers (“Alex”). Atlantic has 29 employees worldwide with offices in New York City and Tokyo. As of August 2021, the firm had $1.9 billion in assets under management.

== History ==
Alexander J. Roepers founded Atlantic Investment Management in 1988. Atlantic manages concentrated long/short equity portfolios and employs fundamental analysis with a bottom-up stock picking approach to create its portfolios, conducting in-house research to make its investments. The firm often takes large stakes—up to 7% of the shares outstanding—in a small number of stocks. Atlantic investment funds include the Cambrian Fund, Cambrian Japan, AJR/Quest, Cambrian Global and Cambrian Europe. Atlantic's largest fund, the Cambrian Fund, is a long-only activist fund that generally invests in only 6 or 7 securities.

In 1992, Atlantic began the Cambrian strategy, investing in a concentrated portfolio of approximately six medium to low-tech industrial companies. In 1993, Roepers launched AJR International, an offshore hedge fund.

The firm invests in various sectors including packaging, aerospace, pumps and valves, industrial materials, specialty chemicals, information-technology services and food companies. The firm looks for stocks between $1 billion and $20 billion in market cap, with high quality balance sheets and low debt expenses.

== Activist philosophy ==
While Atlantic is widely considered to be an activist investor, Roepers has been called the gentlemen activist. Roepers leads Atlantic using a more subtle approach to engaging corporate management called Constructive Shareholder Activism, which involves making suggestions behind the scenes rather than in public.

== Leadership ==
Alex Roepers is the Founder, President and Portfolio Manager of Atlantic Investment Management. He has been in the investment business for more than 25 years.

Prior to founding Atlantic, Roepers worked for Dover Corporation as Director of Corporate Development and at Thyssen-Bornemisza Group, both multi-billion industrialized conglomerates.

Roepers graduated in 1980 with a BBA from Nijenrode University, the Netherlands School of Business and in 1984 with an MBA from Harvard Business School, where he serves on the Board of Dean's Advisors.
