= The Voleon Group =

Quantitative asset management firm based in Berkeley, California

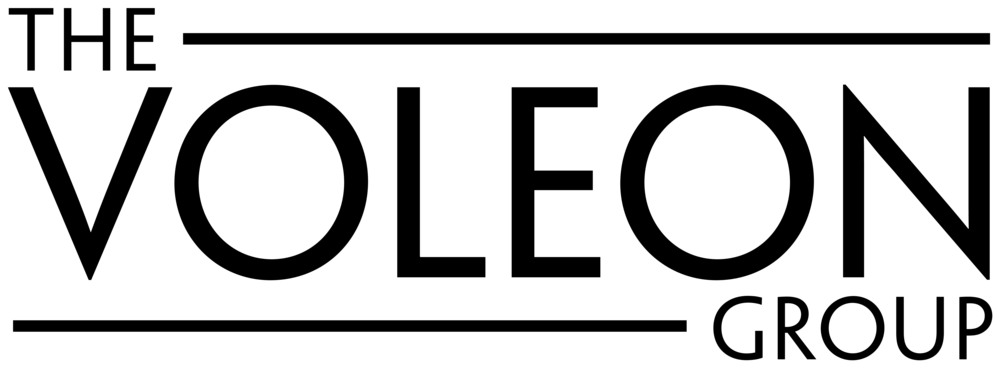
- Type: Private
- Industry: Investment Management
- Founded: 2007; 19 years ago
- Founders: Michael Kharitonov; Jon McAuliffe
- Headquarters: Berkeley, California, U.S.
- Key people: Michael Kharitonov (CEO); Jon McAuliffe (Co-CIO)
- Products: Hedge funds Quantitative finance
- AUM: US$23.4 billion (January 2026)
- Number of employees: 430 (January 2026)
- Website: www.voleon.com

The Voleon Group (Voleon) is an American quantitative investment management firm based in Berkeley, California. The firm makes use of artificial intelligence and machine learning in its trading strategies.

== History ==
Voleon was founded in 2007 by Michael Kharitonov and Jon McAuliffe. Both were PhD holders and had worked at D. E. Shaw & Co. before founding the firm. In the past, they believed computers were not powerful enough to make use of machine learning in investing, nor were there enough data sets. However, after more powerful computers and data sets came out, the duo believed they could finally make use of machine learning for investment purposes and proceeded to found Voleon.

Investors were initially skeptical of Voleon's approach to investing. The firm started live trading in the fall of 2008 during the 2008 financial crisis, and for the following two years, the firm lost money despite the market recovery. The Voleon founders believed they were dealing with one of machine learning's hardest problems and would need time to optimize the system before it could earn a profit.

In late 2011, the founders of Voleon discarded most machine-learning techniques from other applications and replaced them with custom-made systems designed for financial markets. The process had challenges, such as running simulations for vast quantities of data which took weeks. Even after the firm bought special chips built for graphics processing units, the simulations took a long time. In July 2012, a second-generation platform was launched after the firm figured out a solution.

Voleon finally produced positive returns in 2011, followed by returns of 34.9% in 2012 and 46.3% in 2013. However, the firm produced lesser returns from 2014 to 2015 and, in 2016, suffered a loss of more than 9%, which raised concerns among investors. In 2017, it produced returns that were below its peers.

In 2017, The Wall Street Journal reported on the difficulties faced by the firm. At that point, Voleon had an annualized return since inception of 10.5%, below the S&P 500 index return of 10.7% over the same period. One of the problems encountered was that financial markets were chaotic, and machine learning systems were best applied where patterns were more repeating in nature. In addition, patterns that are found can be easily made redundant after investors notice and take advantage of them. Gary Smith writes that patterns discovered by the algorithms are often simply coincidences rather than actual correlations.

In 2018, Voleon had a return of 14% during a market turndown where the S&P 500 index dropped 6.2%. However, in 2019, its returns dropped to 7%, below the returns of its hedge fund peers of 9.2%. In 2020, Voleon's flagship fund lost 9%. According to Bloomberg News, Voleon's longest running fund averaged an annual return of about 9.5% since inception.

Voleon's Institutional fund, which is equity market neutral, gained 10.4% in 2022, 13.6% in 2024, and is up 14% year-to-date through April 2025. The firm's multi-strategy Voleon Composition fund posted gains of 9% in 2022, 13.5% in 2024 and is up 12% year-to-date through April 2025. As of January 31, 2026, Voleon has $23.4 billion in assets under management.

In early October 2023, Business Insider reported that the company maintained some of the harshest non-compete clauses in the industry, requiring employees who sign the agreement to vacate the industry for two years without pay or face possible legal action. In mid-October, the firm acknowledged that they would void and not enforce these contracts with all former employees.

== Investment strategy ==
The firm engages in statistical arbitrage by going through data to find trading signals and patterns related to securities. A machine learning approach is used where computers are trained to operate independently with no human supervision to write algorithms that make predictions for trades. The founders have stated these algorithms are like black boxes, and they do not know how they work internally. An example of machine learning involves the analysis of terabytes of data on every price change of every stock in 15 years. While other peers also use machine learning, Voleon focuses solely on it when performing trades.
