= AlphaSimplex Group =

Asset management firm based in Boston

AlphaSimplex Group, LLC
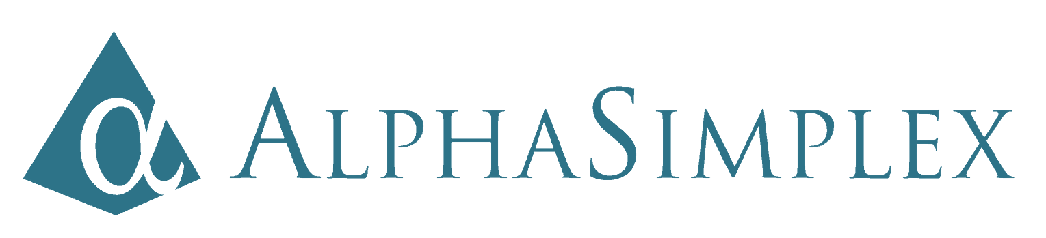

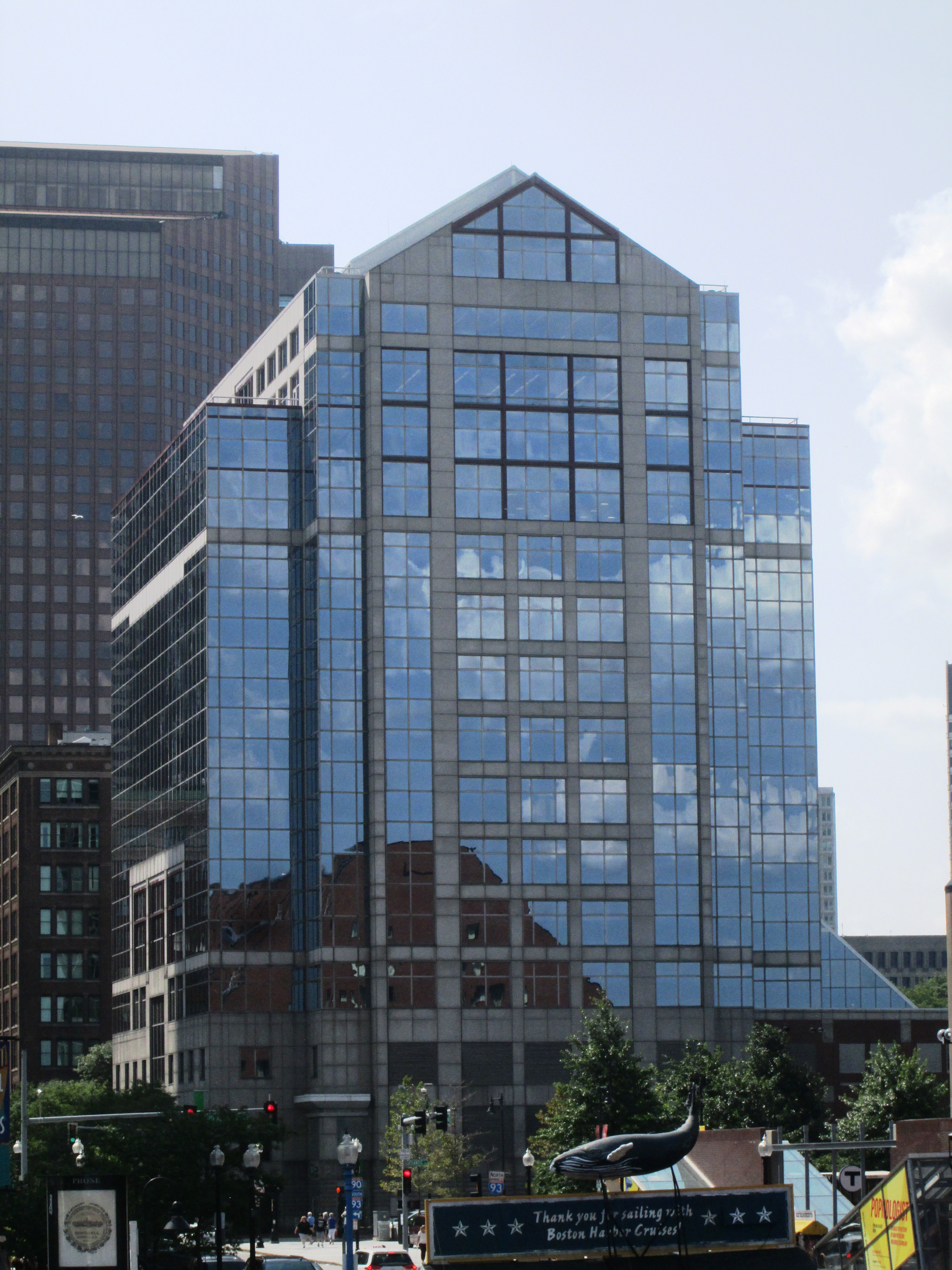
- Headquarters at 200 State Street
- Company type: Subsidiary
- Industry: Investment Management
- Founded: 1999; 27 years ago
- Founder: Andrew Lo
- Headquarters: Boston, Massachusetts, U.S.
- Key people: Duncan Wilkinson (CEO)
- AUM: US$4.34 billion (RAUM per ADV 2025)
- Number of employees: 44 (2022)
- Parent: Virtus Investment Partners (2023–present); Natixis Investment Managers (2007–2023)
- Website: www.alphasimplex.com

AlphaSimplex Group (AlphaSimplex) is an American investment management firm based in Boston. The firm relies on quantitative analysis for its approach to investing.

On October 20, 2022, it was announced that Natixis Investment Managers would sell AlphaSimplex to Virtus Investment Partners. The acquisition completed in April 2023.

== Background ==
AlphaSimplex was founded in 1999 by Andrew Lo. Lo is a professor of Finance at MIT Sloan School of Management. He was chairman and Chief Investment Strategist of the firm until 2018 when he transitioned to his current role as chairman emeritus and Senior advisor.

In 2007, Natixis Investment Managers acquired AlphaSimplex. In the same year, AlphaSimplex and Credit Suisse launched the first 130–30 fund index.

The firm's most notable funds are its Managed Futures Strategy Fund launched in 2010 and its Global Alternatives Fund launched in 2008. Its Managed Futures Strategy Fund uses a quantitative approach to trend following. Its Global Alternatives Fund is a mutual fund that provides the strategies and properties of hedge funds to average investors who otherwise would not be able to invest in hedge funds due their strict investor requirements. The firm also had a Liquid alternative fund called Diversifying Strategies Fund that was launched in 2009 but closed in 2013 due to poor returns.

The firm is registered with the Commodity Futures Trading Commission as a commodity pool operator (CPO) and commodity trading advisor (CTA). Since 2010, flat fee trend following has been its flagship CTA strategy.

From 2022 to 2023, AlphaSimplex made a two-year short bet against US Bonds. Its public mutual fund had a 36% return in 2022 due to the bond market rout that year but had a 10% loss in 2023 when the bond market rebounded towards end of the year.
