= Squarepoint Capital =

Investment firm based in New York

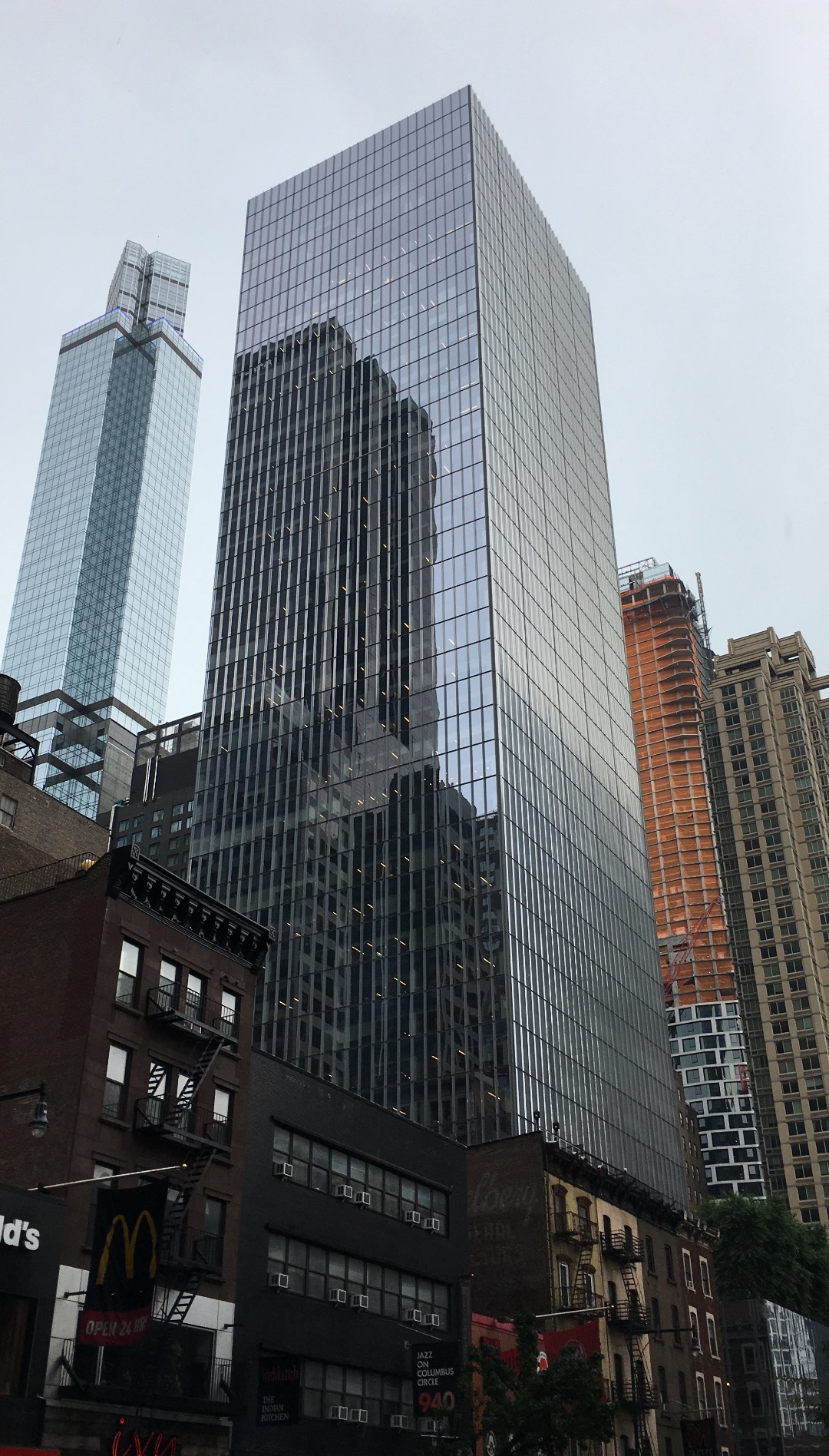
- Headquarters in New York
- Type: Private
- Industry: Financial services
- Predecessor: nQuant
- Founded: December 16, 2014; 11 years ago
- Founders: Olivier Durantel; Gregoire Schneider; Antoine Fillet; Maxime Fortin
- Headquarters: 250 West 55th Street, New York City, New York, U.S.
- Number of locations: 17
- Products: Investment Management
- AUM: US$226.9 billion (2026)
- Number of employees: 2350 (2026)
- Website: www.squarepoint-capital.com

Squarepoint Capital ("Squarepoint") is a global investment management firm headquartered in New York City & London. The firm is known for its quantitative finance approach to investing. Squarepoint has additional offices in Bangalore, Boston, Dubai, Geneva, Hong Kong, Houston, Jersey, London, Madrid, Montreal, New York, Paris, Singapore, and Zug.

== Background ==
The origins of Squarepoint can be traced to nQuant, a proprietary trading unit founded within Lehman Brothers in 2000. Its founders were Olivier Durantel and Gregoire Schneider. Antoine Fillet and Maxime Fortin joined the team in 2003 and 2004 respectively. All four of them were alumni of École polytechnique, a French engineering school. nQuant was sold to Barclays in 2008 after it acquired Lehman Brothers North American operations.

In May 2014, Barclays announced it planned to cut jobs and businesses that were not considered part of its core business. nQuant, was considered a non-core business and the Volcker Rule meant it could no longer perform proprietary trading activities under a commercial bank. In August 2014, it was reported that nQuant was going to be spun off as an independent firm with 60 employees leaving.

On December 15, 2014, nQuant was spun off as an independent firm and was renamed to Squarepoint. On January 2, 2015, Squarepoint received approval from the Financial Conduct Authority to manage investments on behalf of third parties. Within two years of its launch, Squarepoint doubled its staff headcount.

According the firm's filing in 2020, 80% of its investors are non-U.S.

In October 2021, Squarepoint entered a strategic partnership with Arini Capital, a European hedge fund. Squarepoint would provide support to the fund.

In March 2022, it was reported Squarepoint has been trading bitcoin futures on the Chicago Mercantile Exchange, but has been hesitant on trading crypto directly.

=== STG Group ===
In 2022, Squarepoint formed STG ("Squarepoint Trading Group") Group as a proprietary trading group, which shares much of its infrastructure but is staffed by separate investment employees, who operate independently from Squarepoint's traders.

Through its STG Ltd. arm, the group entered the metals trade and began moving shipments across Europe and Asia, as well as the electricity trade on the European Power Exchange.

In 2024, the group acquired the Automated Volatility Trading (AVT) unit of Global Trading Systems, which had itself acquired the unit from Barclays.

On September 30, 2025, the group acquired the broker-dealer Hull Partners, LLC as STG Securities, LLC. Kirill Gelman, previously of the AVT unit, was appointed as CEO. This move is meant to increase trading speed for STG and allow its entry into the US options market-making segment.

== Lawsuits ==
=== Footnoted.com ===
Footnoted.com was a financial news and research website founded by Michelle Leder. Leder launched a lawsuit against Squarepoint alleging it had stolen 16,000 pages worth of information without paying.

=== Vojislav Sesum ===
In April 2018, Squarepoint launched a lawsuit against a former employee, Vojislav Sesum, who it claimed had developed a trading strategy while at Squarepoint and subsequently offered it to Millennium Management. The arbitrator initially directed Sesum to pay Squarepoint $188,137 in damages plus $919,053 in respect of disgorged earnings he received from Millennium, but the final order issued in 2020 reduced these amounts.
