= Capula Investment Management =

British hedge fund

Capula Investment Management LLP
- Industry: Hedge fund
- Founded: 2005; 21 years ago
- Founders: • Yan Huo; • Masao Asai
- Headquarters: London, United Kingdom
- AUM: US$ 27.0 billion (Q4 2023)
- Website: www.capulaglobal.com

Capula Investment Management LLP is a British hedge fund, the fourth largest in Europe, with assets under management (AUM) of about $30 billion as of 2024. It is headquartered at 7 Clarges Street, in Mayfair, London with affiliated entities in Hong Kong, Japan, Singapore and the US. It was founded in 2005 by Yan Huo and Masao Asai, as a spin-off from UFJI. The firm manages absolute return, enhanced fixed income, macro and crisis alpha strategies.
