= Qube Research & Technologies =

British quantitative investment firm

Qube Research & Technologies Limited
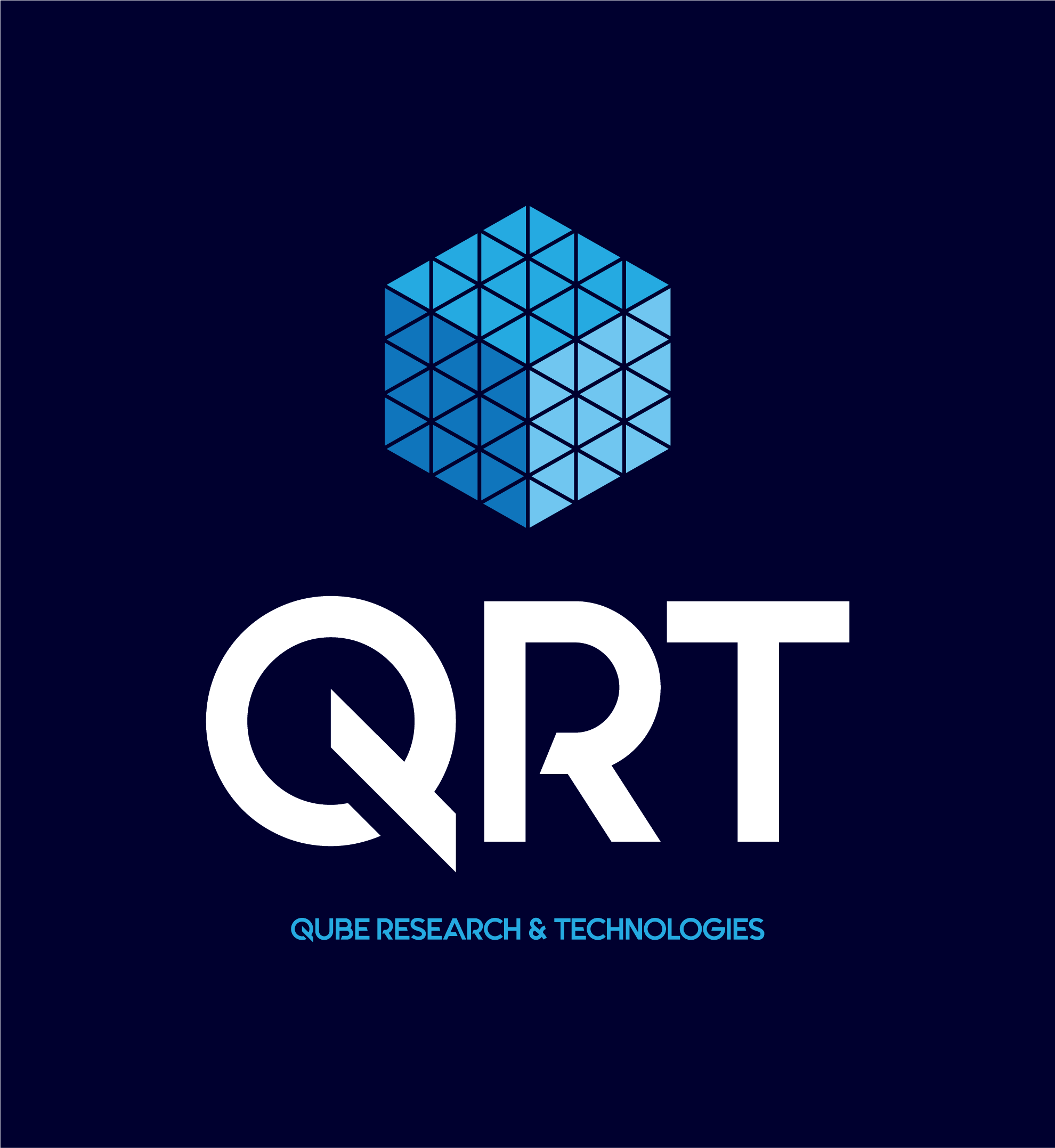
- Type: Private
- Industry: Investment management
- Predecessor: Credit Suisse Quantitative and Systematic Asset Management
- Founded: 2016; 10 years ago
- Founders: Pierre-Yves Morlat; Laurent Laizet
- Headquarters: London, United Kingdom
- Key people: Pierre-Yves Morlat (CEO); Laurent Laizet (CIO)
- Products: Hedge funds Quantitative finance
- AUM: US$38 billion (March 2025)
- Number of employees: 1,400 (February 2025)
- Parent: Trident Capital Holdings
- Website: www.qube-rt.com

Qube Research & Technologies (QRT) is a British quantitative investment management firm headquartered in London. The business originated inside Credit Suisse’s Quantitative and Systematic Asset Management unit in 2016 and became independent in 2018 after a management buyout. As of January 2026, it managed about US$38 billion and employed approximately 1,400 people.

== Background ==
In late 2016, the Qube Fund was formed and managed by Credit Suisse's Quantitative and Systematic Asset Management unit in London. The fund used computer models to trade stocks and was staffed by proprietary traders. In 2017, it was announced that the fund would be spun off from Credit Suisse due to regulations like the Volcker Rule which restricted banks from performing proprietary trading activities. At the start of 2018, its management team led a management buyout resulting in the unit to become an independent entity and was renamed to Qube Research & Technologies.

In February 2023, QRT stated it planned to hand over some of its capital to be managed by external parties.

On 17 November 2023, according to a FCA filing, QRT had taken a £670 million short position against HSBC. It occurred after HSBC reported a decline in Q3 profit and the position equated to 0.57% of HSBC's market capitalisation making it one of the biggest short positions against a big four UK bank. However QRT later stated that the Financial Conduct Authority filing was made erroneously due to a technical issue and it held no short position against HSBC.

In December 2023, Business Insider reported that two large QRT funds returned more than 20% in 2022, and that the firm’s largest fund was up more than 20% through November 2023.

In January 2024, QRT disclosed it had taken a short position of more than $1 billion against German companies. Its largest short positions were on Volkswagen, Rheinmetall, Siemens Energy and Deutsche Bank.

In March 2024, QRT disclosed it had built a short position of £200 million on Barclays. It equated to 0.73% of Barclay's issued share capital making it the largest disclosed short position against the bank in history.

In February 2025, it was reported that QRT was building a data center in Akureyri to help give it an edge over its peers.

In April 2025, QRT disclosed it had taken a significant short position of almost 6 million shares against Trump Media & Technology Group. In response the company urged the US Securities and Exchange Commission to investigate the trade as alleged 'suspicious activity'.
