= Moore Capital Management =

American investment management firm

Moore Capital Management, LP
- Company type: Limited partnership
- Industry: Investment management
- Founded: 1989
- Headquarters: New York, New York (additional offices in London, Hong Kong and Miami)
- Key people: Louis Bacon
- AUM: US$10.2 billion (2018)
- Number of employees: 349 (2018)
- Website: www.moorecap.com

Moore Capital Management, LP (MCM) is a global investment management firm headquartered in New York, New York. In September 2018, MCM had $10.2 billion in total assets under management.

== History ==
MCM was founded in 1989 by American billionaire Louis Moore Bacon. He launched the fund using a $25,000 inheritance from his mother. MCM's first investor was Antoine Bernheim, president of Dome Capital Management, who in 1990 accounted for $1.5 million of MCM's initial $1.8 million in assets and redeemed his investment in 2009.

In 2008, MCM let nervous investors redeem $5 billion in shares despite decent performance. In 2009 MCM launched two new funds; Moore Emerging Equity Long/Short Fund and Moore Emerging Fixed Income and Currency Fund. The company also offered incentives for new investors in other funds.

In 2010, British regulators arrested Moore Capital Management employee Julian Rifat for allegedly participating in illegal insider trading. The arrest was in connection with Rifat trading from personal accounts, not from Moore Capital Management funds.

In April of that year, MCM paid $48.425 million to settle charges brought against it by the Commodity Futures Trading Commission(CFTC) which accused MCM of manipulating settlement prices for Nymex platinum and palladium futures contracts.

In August 2013 MCM paid $48.4 million to settle a class action lawsuit in relation to the platinum and palladium manipulation claims.

As of June 2018, its main fund, Moore Global Investors, has posted an annualized return of 15.8% since inception.

On November 21, 2019, Louis Bacon announced that he is planning to shutter Moore Capital's funds and return capital to investors with the primary reasons being the disappointing results of the fund over the last couple of years along with the intensified competition which had put enormous pressure on the firm’s profitability which ultimately led to a challenging business environment. According to an investor letter released by the firm, Moore's will continue to invest through the fund similar to Tam Capital LP. Additionally, after returning outside money, the Moore Global Investments, Remington Investment Strategies and Moore Macro Advisors will be consolidated into a single proprietary fund.

== Business model ==
MCM is characterized as a global macro investor, utilizing macroeconomic themes, cash, futures and derivatives in its portfolios. Bacon, its founder, participates in most of the global markets, basing his moves on his evaluation of the future trends of inflation, economic growth, central bank policy and national politics. He then determines what themes and investments to play based on data from his strategists and researchers.
