= Voloridge Investment Management =

Quantitative asset management firm based in Jupiter, Florida

Voloridge Investment Management, LLC
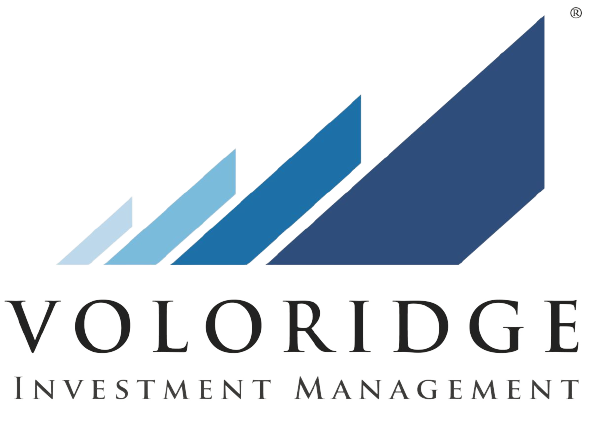
- Company type: Private
- Industry: Investment Management
- Founded: 2009; 17 years ago
- Founder: David Vogel
- Headquarters: Jupiter, Florida, U.S.
- Key people: David Vogel (CEO)
- Products: Hedge funds Quantitative finance
- AUM: US$9.5 billion (2022)
- Owner: Quantitative Investment Management (25%)
- Number of employees: 112 (March 2023)
- Website: www.voloridge.com

Voloridge Investment Management (Voloridge) is an American quantitative investment management firm based in Jupiter, Florida.

== Background ==
In 2007, David Vogel started his quantitative investment career after he was discovered by Jaffray Woodriff during a Netflix Prize coding competition. Woodriff then hired Vogel as a consultant at his firm, Quantitative Investment Management (QIM). In 2009, Vogel founded Voloridge in Jupiter, Florida. QIM would later acquire a 25% stake in Voloridge.

In September 2017, Bloomberg News reported that Voloridge had a three-year annualized return of 38%. In addition, since its inception, the firm has not posted a yearly loss.

In January 2020, Bloomberg News reported that Voloridge was launching a $1.5 billion climate change fund due to demands of investors seeking out ESG investments. Vogel also had a personal interest in climate change as he and his family were personally affected by Hurricane Irma due to Jupiter being a beach town near the coastline. However, in January 2022, Voloridge closed two sustainable hedge funds and moved the money into the firm's main pool. The changes were made as it was believed to be more profitable to manage green investments in a larger, broader vehicle.

Voloridge relies solely on data to make investment decisions. It does not have a flat management fee and only charges a performance fee as a percentage of its own returns.
