= PDT Partners =

Quantitative hedge fund

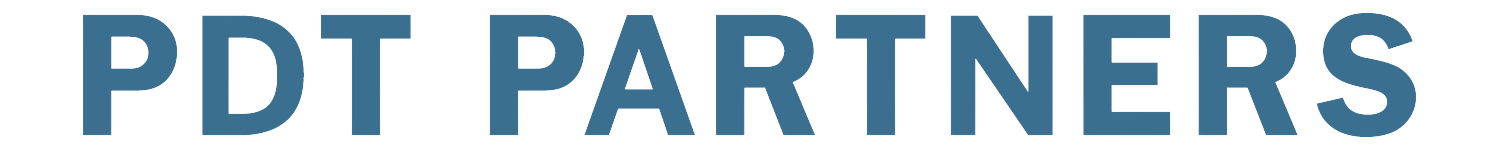
- Industry: Hedge fund
- Founded: 1993
- Founder: Peter Muller
- Headquarters: New York City
- Products: Investment funds
- Services: Investment management
- AUM: US$ 19.0 billion (as of June 30, 2026)
- Website: pdtpartners.com

PDT Partners (Process Driven Trading Partners) is a hedge fund company, led by quantitative trader Peter Muller, that was founded in 1993 as part of Morgan Stanley's trading division and spun off as an independent business in 2012. It has offices in New York City and London.

== History ==
PDT Partners started out as a proprietary trading division (called the Process Driven Trading Group) of multinational financial services corporation Morgan Stanley in 1993. According to Bloomberg, PDT's investments have returned an estimated annual average of more than 20 percent through 2010.

In January 2011, Morgan Stanley announced that it would spin off PDT into a separate hedge fund in order to comply with the Dodd–Frank Wall Street Reform and Consumer Protection Act.

The spin-off began in 2012. In October 2012, it was announced that the Blackstone Group had put $500 million into PDT, but without seeking any equity in the hedge fund. Bloomberg.com considered this unusual and a testament to Muller's market power and ability. In 2013, the spin-off was complete. In February 2013, it was announced that the fund had raised $2.3 billion in total and was beginning operations in London and Hong Kong in addition to New York City.

Peter Muller, the CEO of PDT, who started PDT as Morgan Stanley's proprietary trading group, was described by Bloomberg.com as an "unlikely executive", a 47-year-old math wizard, and a person with diverse intellectual interests and hobbies. In 2019, Forbes reported that Muller earned around $150 million in the previous year, making its list of the highest-earning hedge fund managers for 2018.
