= RA Capital Management =

Healthcare investment firm in Boston

RA Capital Management, L.P.
- Type: Private
- Industry: Financial services
- Founded: January 2002; 24 years ago
- Founders: Richard Aldrich; Peter Kolchinsky
- Headquarters: Berkeley Building, Boston, Massachusetts, U.S.
- Key people: Peter Kolchinsky (Managing Partner); Rajeev Shah (Managing Partner)
- Products: Hedge fund Venture capital Private equity
- AUM: US$12.6 billion (March 2025)
- Number of employees: 130 (March 2024)
- Website: www.racap.com

RA Capital Management (RA Capital) is an American investment firm based in Boston. It is focused on making public and private investments in the healthcare, biotechnology, and planetary health industries.

== History ==
The company that would become RA Capital was started in 2001 by Richard Aldrich, a co-founder of Vertex Pharmaceuticals. In 2002, Aldrich hired Peter Kolchinsky, who was earning his doctorate in virology from Harvard, to invest $4 million of seed money in biotech. RA Capital, named after Aldrich, was officially formed in 2004.

The firm was initially set up as hedge fund that invested in public companies although it would later invest in private companies as well. RA Capital has an in-house research group, named TechAtlas that creates its disease-specific maps.

One of the firm's earliest successful investments was its investment into Triangle Pharmaceuticals which Gilead Sciences acquired for $464 million in early 2003.

Aldrich left RA Capital in 2009 to start Longwood Fund, a venture capital firm, although he still remains an investor in RA Capital.

In 2009, RA Capital assets fell by 35.3% due to its large investment in Sequenom which lost 90% of its market value after it admitted it had falsified data on its tests for Down syndrome treatment. As a result, the firm limited individual investments to 15% of the firm's assets.

The firm made one of its first private investments in 2010 when it participated in a $15 million series C round for T2 Biosystems.

In 2014, the U.S. Securities and Exchange Commission announced it had sanctioned nineteen firms that illegally participated in stock offerings less than five days after short selling the stock. RA Capital was one of the firms and agreed to pay the largest amount out of them with disgorgement of $2.65 million, interest of $73,000 and a $905,000 penalty.

As of 2015, the firm had delivered an annualized return of 28.4% since its founding.

In 2019, the firm launched its first venture fund, RA Capital Nexus Fund I which raised $300 million.

In 2019, the firm started an incubator called Carnot to test the viability of early-stage biotechnology companies. As of 2020, the firm had begun operating an incubator program called RAVentures to help develop new and early-stage companies working in biotechnology.

In 2020, the firm’s second venture fund, Nexus Fund II, raised $461 million. The firm’s third venture fund, Nexus Fund III, raised $880 million in 2021.

In 2023, the firm founded a team to focus on investments in planetary health. In its first year, RA Capital Planetary Health participated in a $30.5 million series C round for a recycling startup and a $30 million series B round for a battery equipment startup.
