= Global macro trading =

Investment strategy

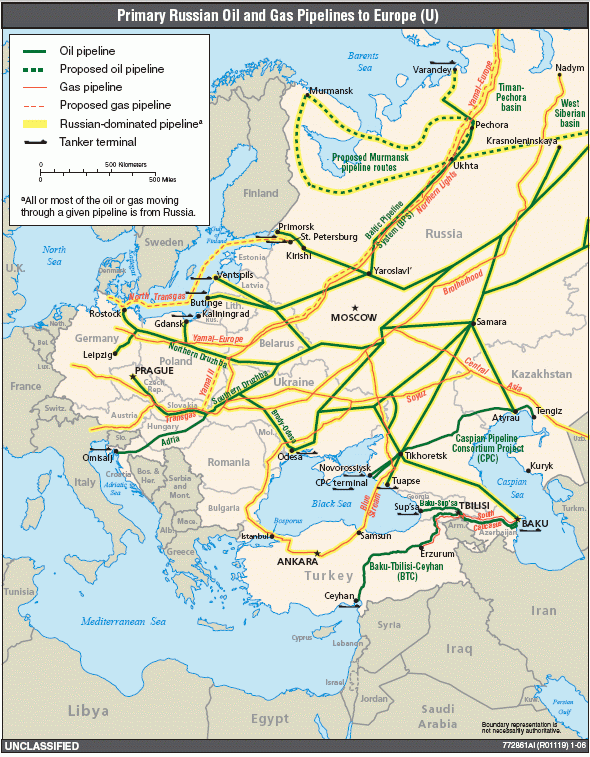
The 2022 Russian invasion of Ukraine destabilized global energy markets and created investment opportunities as Russia was a key oil and gas supplier to much of Europe.

Global macro trading is an investment strategy that leverages macroeconomic and geopolitical data to analyze and predict moves in financial markets. Large-scale or "macro" political and economic events can disproportionately impact certain sectors, such as the energy, commodity, and currency markets, over others. The strategy typically employs forecasts and analysis of interest rate trends, international trade and payments, political changes, government policies, international relations, and other broad systemic factors.

== History ==
As a strategy, global macro formalized in the late-1960s around primary commercial products. Large-scale macro events pushed market prices of both soft (cocoa, fruit and sugar) and hard (gold, silver, and copper) commodities to move in recognizable patterns. In the 1970s, interest rate modeling was used to predict moves in foreign currency markets as well as in sovereign debt. Hedge fund managers such as Paul Tudor Jones used large-scale demographic analysis to predict the equity market collapse of 1987 after comparing the market conditions of a similar crash in 1929. The 1990s saw the rise of global macro volatility trading which used geopolitical instability in both developed and developing nations to place directional bets on market movements.

In 1992, hedge fund manager George Soros' profitable sale of the pound sterling prior to the European Exchange Rate Mechanism debacle yielded him a profit of $1 billion in a single day. In 1994, investment management firms began factoring in macro data into a portfolios' risk profile. Three years later in 1997, the Global Economic Policy Uncertainty (GEPU) Index was created to measure three key macro variables: economy, policy, and uncertainty (volatility). During the 2010s, quantitative investment funds dedicated resources to global macro strategies due to the complexity involved with analyzing large amounts of dynamic economic and political data. Modern technology including AI has been used to sort through data and in the execution of trades involving certain sectors, such as the energy, commodity, and currency markets, among others.

== Funds ==
A list of global macro investment funds include:

- Bridgewater Associates
- Element Capital Management
- Moore Capital Management
- Caxton Associates
- Brevan Howard Asset Management
- King Street Capital Management
- Sculptor Capital Management

== See also ==
- Quantitative investing
- Political statistics
- Econometrics
- Foreign policy
- Monetary policy
