= Asset management in China =

State-owned asset management

Asset management companies in China came into being in 1998. The founding of commercial Asset management companies (AMC; Chinese: 金融资产管理公司) established by the Ministry of Finance tasked with professionally managing third-party assets was a major landmark in the development of China's financial system. It marks a transition in Chinese regulation away from an unregulated environment toward a system where specialist companies started to operate according to a defined set of standards and regulations.

== Development of AMCs ==
From 1998 to 1999, the Chinese government created 10 AMCs in China. 4 as bad banks, one for each of the four commercial state-owned banks. and 6 Fund management companies. As of 2018 there are over 130 asset management companies in china, with a combined US$2 billion in assets under management.

The original asset management companies include:

- China Great Wall Asset Management - for the Agricultural Bank of China
- China Orient Asset Management - for the Bank of China
- China Cinda Asset Management - for the China Construction Bank
- China Huarong Asset Management - for the Industrial and Commercial Bank of China
- Guotai Asset Management
- China Southern Asset Management
- HuaAn Fund Management
- Bosera Asset Management
- Penghua Fund Management
- China Asset Management

Other AMCs that were established later on include:

- Changsheng Fund Management
- China Universal
- Dacheng Fund Management
- E Fund Management
- Fullgoal Asset Management
- Harvest Fund Management
- ICBC UBS Asset Management
- Tianhong Asset Management

== See also ==
- Chinese financial system
- Insurance industry in China
- Economy of China
- State-owned enterprise
