= Shanghai Stock Exchange STAR Market =

Chinese stock exchange focused on technology companies

STAR Market
- Type: Stock exchange
- Location: Shanghai, China
- Founded: July 22, 2019; 7 years ago
- Owner: Shanghai Stock Exchange
- Currency: Chinese Yuan
- No. of listings: Approximately 179
- Market cap: ▲RMB 15.5 Trillion (July 2026)
- Website: star.sse.com.cn

The Shanghai Stock Exchange STAR Market, officially known as the Shanghai Stock Exchange Science and Technology Innovation Board (Chinese: 上海证券交易所科创板), is a Chinese science and technology focused equities market established on July 22, 2019.

STAR has been touted as Shanghai's equivalent to America's Nasdaq, with state media alluding to its goal as giving Chinese science and technology companies greater access to capital markets. In July 2020, it was valued at more than US $400 billion.. As of July 2026, it had market cap of 15.5 trillion yuan (US$2,300 billion).

== History ==
=== Proposal and Purpose ===
On November 5, 2018, Chinese leader and CCP general secretary Xi Jinping delivered a speech, announcing that China will "launch a science and technology innovation board ('SSE STAR Market') and the pilot registration-based IPO system at the Shanghai Stock Exchange." The delivery was made in the midst of the China–U.S. Trade War.

On July 22, 2019, the STAR Market began operations as a board of the Shanghai Stock Exchange, 7 months after the announcement of its creation. The purpose of the board is to support "sci-tech and innovative enterprises that align with national strategies, hold core and breakthrough technologies, and enjoy a high degree of market recognition" in raising capital.

=== Rules of Listing ===
To attract technology companies, STAR allows the listing of companies with multiple share classes, Red Chip companies already listed abroad, and currently unprofitable companies. As of August 2020, is viewed to be in a strong position to attract listings from the US, which is in a trade war with China and announced sanctions on Chinese companies such as Huawei and TikTok.

The listing requirements in STAR is based on registration and disclosure rather than approval. Regulators are to have limited roles in the listing process, and would have no say over how shares are priced (e.g. as a multiple of the price to earnings ratio) or when they came to market, unlike other stock market in mainland China. A system based on registration and disclosure is seen as more market-oriented and more in line with the system in markets like the United States. Regulators hoped the experiment can offer Chinese companies more access to financing, thereby allowing the financial system to support and bolster the real economy.

The Chinese government wanted STAR to experiment with the registration-based listing process as a pilot for potential reforms in the wider Chinese stock market. At the time, the China Securities Regulatory Commission (CSRC) has the power to approve or reject IPOs in China. Requirements on size and sustained profitability meant that many Chinese companies are unable to list domestically and were forced to list abroad, particularly in the United States and Hong Kong. Since 1993, 354 Chinese companies have listed in the U.S., raising a total of $88.5 billion. In the period of January to August in 2020, Chinese companies raised $5.23 billion in U.S. initial public offerings.

=== Operation ===
In March 2019, the Shanghai Stock Exchange began accepting applications for the first round of STAR listings. Until July, 149 technology and science companies signed up to list their stocks on its debut, aiming to raise a total of CN¥ 129 billion ($19 billion). The first round of subscriptions took place between June 27 and July 21, with 25 listed companies, 264 institutional investors and over 3 million individual investors participating.

The first 25 companies to list on the exchange raised CN¥ 37 billion (5.36) collectively, through the issuance of new shares that closed their first trading day on STAR Market. Among the first companies to list on its first day of trading were chipmakers Anji and Montage Technology, the state-owned train controls producer CRSC, and the battery materials manufacturer Ronbay Technology. STAR Market allows investors to trade if they have an account balance of at least CN¥ 500,000 ($72376) and two years of trading history.

The Shanghai Stock Exchange and Shenzhen Stock Exchanges permit main board stock prices to move 44 per cent on their first day of trading, after which they are limited to moves of up to 10 per cent. By contrast, the Star Market has no limits on share price movements during a stock's first five days. Its shares surged by 520% in its debut.

As of July 2019, the P/E multiple for the 30 Star stocks listed is over 100, seen as very high. Listings have slowed considerably since its debut, as regulators seek to avoid approving companies that could cause reputational damage to CCP leader Xi Jinping, who unveiled plans for the market.

In March 2020, the Chinese Securities Law, which governs the issuance of securities, was amended. The new law will adopt a registration system for all IPOs after testing the system in STAR and deeming it to be successful.

In July 2020, STAR hit a record level in the value of new listings. Companies raised more than US$7 billion in July 2020, a 46% increase compared with July 2019. Notable listings in July 2020 included publicly-held semiconductor manufacturer SMIC, which was China's biggest share sale in a decade. Ant Financial, a fintech company and affiliate of Alibaba Group, has plans of an IPO in STAR. Ant Financial is reporting seeking to raise $30 billion, making it potentially one of the biggest IPOs in history. However, on the eve of the IPO, China stopped the process from moving forward.

In June 2022, the Financial Times reported that in 2022, IPOs in Chinese stock markets (at almost US $35 billion) raised more than double the amount raised on Wall Street ($16 billion). Much of the fundraising was in the Star Market and Shenzhen's tech-driven ChiNext Market, with a focus on companies in the fields of renewables, semiconductors and other high-end manufacturing. Semiconductor-related companies had raised more than $6.6 billion on the STAR Market as of June 2022, and China's largest IPO so far in 2022, JinkoSolar, raised almost $1.6bn on the STAR Market in January 2022. IPOs and preparations for listings went ahead in Shanghai despite months of strict lockdowns in Shanghai in 2022. The reporting suggests that there is a trend among pre-IPO Chinese companies to look into listings in Mainland China instead of in Hong Kong or the US.

== STAR Market ETFs ==
Several major investment managers offer exchange-traded funds tracking the STAR market, including China Southern Asset Management (CSOP STAR 50 Index), China Asset Management, E Fund Management and ICBC Credit Suisse Asset Management. There are relatively few non-Chinese ETFs that track the STAR market. One is KSTR, created by Krane Funds Advisers, a Chinese-owned U.S.-based investment company.
