= GF Securities =

Chinese Securities Brokerage

GF Securities Co., Ltd.

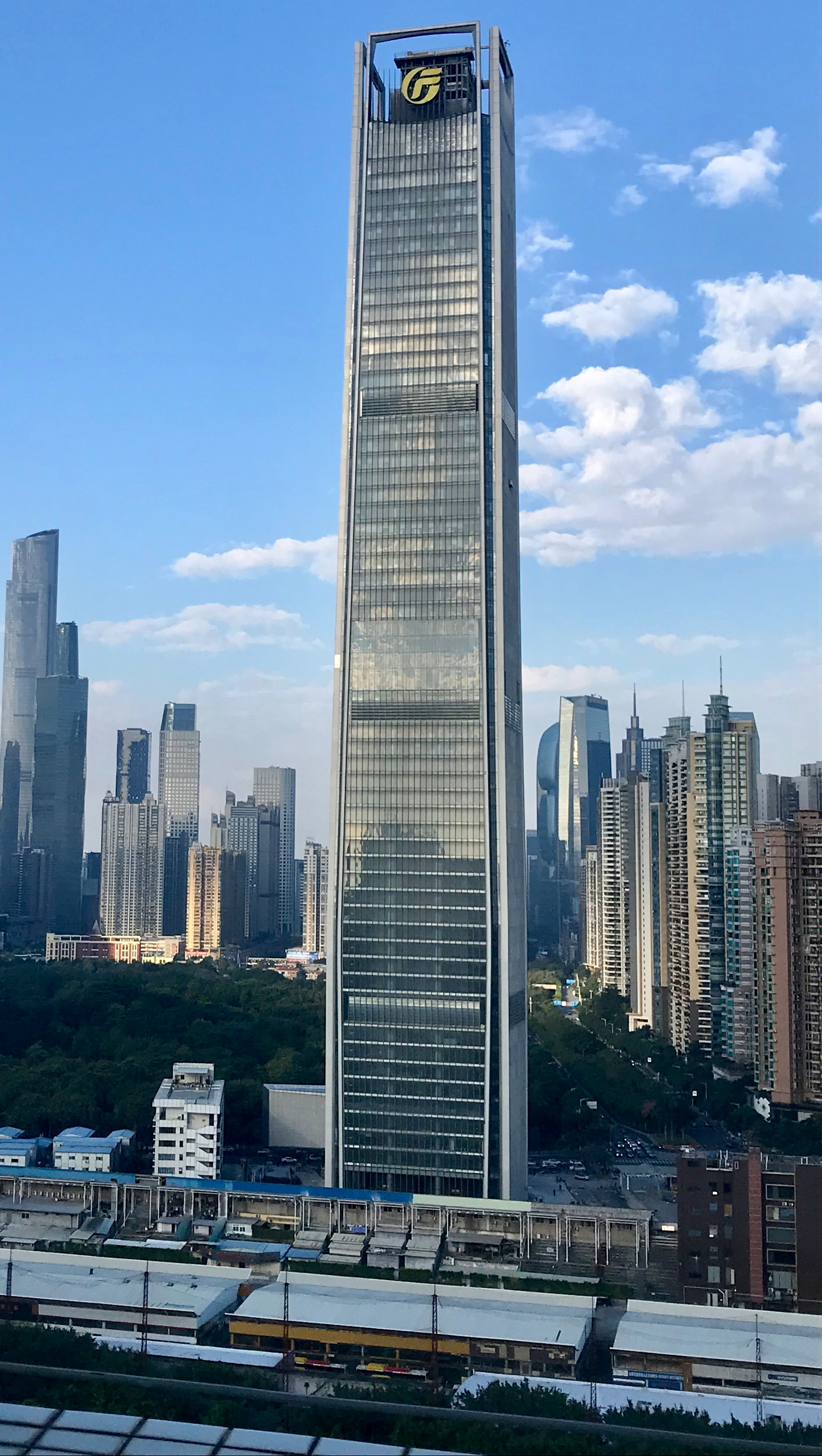
- Headquarters at GF Securities Tower
- Native name: 广发证券股份有限公司
- Formerly: Guangfa Securities
- Company type: Public
- Traded as: SZSE: 000776 (A share); SEHK: 1776 (H share); CSI Midcap 200
- Industry: Financial services
- Founded: 8 September 1991; 34 years ago
- Headquarters: GF Securities Tower, Guangzhou, Guangdong, People's Republic of China
- Key people: Lin Chuanhui (Chairman)
- Services: Securities brokerage Investment banking Investment management
- Revenue: ▲CN¥38.86 billion (FY 2021)
- Net income: ▲CN¥12.00 billion (FY 2021)
- Total assets: ▲CN¥535.86 billion (FY 2021)
- Total equity: ▲CN¥535.86 billion (FY 2021)
- Owners: HKSCC Nominees Limited (22.31%); Jilin Aodong Medicine (16.43%); Liaoning Chengda (16.40%)
- Number of employees: ▲13,174 (FY 2021)
- Subsidiaries: E Fund Management Co., Ltd
- Website: www.gf.com.cn

GF Securities (Chinese: 广发证券; pinyin: Guǎngfā zhèngquàn)is a securities firm in China which engages in the operation of large-scale comprehensive securities broking and trading services. The company was founded in 1991 and is headquartered in Guangzhou, China. By mid-2020, it was among China's four largest securities firms, together with CITIC Securities, Guotai Junan Securities, and Haitong Securities.

== History ==
The securities department of China Guangfa Bank was established on 9 April 1991. On 26 August 1999, the firm was spun-off as a separate company. On 25 July 2001, the firm changed its name to GF Securities.

GF Securities listed on the Shenzhen Stock Exchange on 12 February 2010, via a reverse takeover by Yan Bian Road Construction Co., Ltd.

On 5 August 2015, GF Securities paid $40 million to purchase Natixis' commodities trading unit.

On 10 April 2015, GF Securities listed on the Hong Kong Stock Exchange.

In April 2023, the China Securities Regulatory Commission filed a case against GF Securities for the inadequate review of a shares issuance.

In June 2023, GF Securities announced it would acquire a 20.2% stake in Value Partners.

GF Securities is a member of the SZSE 100 Index which consists of the top 100 A-share listed companies listing and trading on the Shenzhen Stock Exchange ranked by total market capitalization

== Subsidiaries ==
E Fund Management, one of China's largest asset management companies is considered a subsidiary of GF Securities which holds 22.65% of its shares.

== See also ==
- Securities industry in China
