= Heung Kong Group =

Heungkong Group Limited 香江集團
- Company type: Private
- Founded: 1990
- Headquarters: People's Republic of China
- Number of employees: 20,000
- Website: http://www.heungkong.com

Heungkong Group Limited is a Hong Kong conglomerate. Its businesses include retail and manufacture of furniture, logistics, real estate development, property management, natural resources, education, healthcare, and financial services. The group is headquartered in Hong Kong, Guangzhou and Qianhai, Shenzhen.

Heungkong Group was founded in 1990 as a furniture retailer. As its furniture business grows, Heungkong Group started other businesses and has transformed into a conglomerate. In 1996, the Heungkong Group became one of the first Chinese private enterprises to tap into financial investments and strategically invested in many financial institutions. It is a major shareholder of China Guangfa Bank, GF Securities, Guangdong Nanyue Bank and Bank of Tianjin. In 2003, GF Securities and Heungkong Group founded GF Fund Management, China’s second largest mutual fund management company which had $210 billion in assets under management as of December 2023.

Heungkong Group's subsidiaries include Qianhai Heungkong Financial Holdings Group, Heungkong Wanji Aluminum Co., Ltd., Shenzhen HeungKong Holding Co., Ltd. (SSE: 600162), and many more. In 2005, Heungkong Charitable Foundation was established, becoming the first national-level foundation founded by private sector in China. Cofounder Zhai Meiqing received the Carnegie Medal of Philanthropy in 2017.
