= Qualified Foreign Institutional Investor =

Chinese licensing scheme

The Qualified Foreign Institutional Investor (Chinese: 合格境外机构投资者; pinyin: hégé jìngwài jīgòu tóuzīzhě; also known as QFII) program, one of the first efforts to internationalize the RMB, represents China's effort to allow, on a selective basis, global institutional investors to invest in its RMB denominated capital market. Once licensed, foreign investors are permitted to buy RMB-denominated "A shares" in China's mainland Shanghai and Shenzhen stock exchanges. Thus foreign investors benefit from an opportunity to invest onshore, which is otherwise often insulated from the rest of the world, and subject to capital controls governing the movement of assets in-and-out of the country.

== Development ==
The program has been in operation for over a decade, and quotas allocating RMB under licenses have expanded steadily. By the end of April 2011, 103 licensed QFII investors had been granted a combined quota of $20.7 billion to invest in China's capital markets under the QFII program, UBS AG currently holds the greatest single share of quota. Foreign access to China's yuan-denominated "A" stocks are still limited, with quotas placed under the QFII program amounting to US$30 billion.

In April 2012, the Qualified Foreign investment quota was increased from US$30 billion to US$80 billion. Before the increase, the overall value of approved QFII and RQFII (offshore Renminbi QFII) funds was only 0.8% of total market capitalization and only US$25 billion of the US$30 billion quota was used. While aspects of the increased quota seem likely to take business from Hong Kong, a pilot program in Wenzhou for domestic investors to invest abroad was considered a possible offset for the financial center. The QFII expansion was also followed quickly by the "approval of new ETF products that will be denominated in offshore yuan (CNH) but will trade on the Hong Kong Stock Exchange".

China granted $910 million worth of investment quotas to 11 foreign institutional investors in March 2013. The quotas, under the Qualified Foreign Institutional Investor (QFII) scheme, were awarded to overseas institutions including Generali Fund Management S.A, IDG Capital Management (HK) Ltd and Cutwater Investor Services Corp. By the end of March 2013, China had awarded a combined $41.745 billion of QFII quotas to 197 foreign institutions.

By the end of February 2014, the total quotas issued under the QFII programme to $52.3 billion as of February 28 from $51.4 billion at the end of December, and to 180.4 billion yuan ($29.44 billion) from 167.8 billion yuan under the RQFII programme, according to data by the Chinese agency, SAFE.

China's QFII programme quotas stood at $111.38 billion by August 2019, according to data by the foreign exchange regulator.

In September 2019, China's State Administration of Foreign Exchange (SAFE) published a statement, it would remove quotas on the QFII scheme and RQFII.

At the end of September 2020, published by The China Securities Regulatory Commission (CSRC), the central bank(PBOC) and the foreign exchange regulator(SAFE), combine the QFII scheme and RQFII. In addition, foreign institutions will also have access to derivatives, including financial futures, commodity futures and options.

== Background ==
Regulations of the QFII program were based on "Temporary Regulation on Domestic Securities Investment by Qualified Foreign Institutional Investor" (合格境外机构投资者境内证券投资管理暂行办法), which was publicized on 5th Nov 2002 and ceased to be in effect on 1st Sep 2006, and "Regulation on Domestic Securities Investment by Qualified Foreign Institutional Investor"(合格境外机构投资者境内证券投资管理办法), which is publicized on 24th Aug 2006, and came into effect on 1st Sep 2006.

Pursuant to "Regulation on Domestic Securities Investment by Qualified Foreign Institutional Investor", to qualify as a QFII, the candidate must:

- have stable finance, good credibility, meet the minimum asset scale set by China Securities Regulatory Commission (CSRC);
- the number of staffs meet the requirement set by the authority in its own country or area;
- has healthy governing structure and complete internal control system, received no significant punishment in the last 3 years;
- candidate's home country has complete legal and supervision system, and its home country or home area has signed Memorandum of Understanding(MOU) with CSRC, and maintains effective supervision cooperation;
- other requirements set by CSRC based on prudence.

== QFII Custodian Bank ==
HSBC Bank
CitiBank
Standard Chartered Bank
Industrial & Commercial Bank of China
Bank of China
Agricultural Bank of China
Bank of Communications
China Construction Bank
China Everbright Bank
China Merchants Bank
Deutsche Bank
DBS Bank
China Citic Bank
Shanghai Pudong Development Bank Co., Ltd.
China Minsheng Bankingcorp., Ltd.
Bank of Tokyo-Mitsubishi UFJ
Industrial Bank
Ping An Bank
Hua Xia Bank
Bank of Jiangsu
BNP Paribas

]== QFII Qualification Statistics == As of February 2023, a total of 757 institutions outside mainland China have obtained QFII qualifications. The following is a list of approved institutions.

As of December 2021, QFII Qualification Statistics

No.	Name of QFII	Domicile	Qualification approved date
1	UBS AG	Switzerland	2003/5/23
2	Nomura Securities Co., Ltd.	Japan	2003/5/23
3	Morgan Stanley & Co. International PLC.	United Kingdom	2003/6/5
4	Citigroup Global Markets Limited	United Kingdom	2003/6/5
5	Goldman Sachs&Co. LLC	United States	2003/7/4
6	Deutsche Bank Aktiengesellschaft	Germany	2003/7/30
7	The Hongkong and Shanghai Banking Corporation Limited	Hong Kong	2003/8/4
8	JPMorgan Chase Bank, National Association	United States	2003/9/30
9	Credit Suisse (Hong Kong) Limited	Hong Kong	2003/10/24
10	Standard Chartered Bank (Hong Kong) Limited	Hong Kong	2003/12/11
11	Nikko Asset Management Co., Ltd.	Japan	2003/12/11
12	Merrill Lynch International	United Kingdom	2004/4/30
13	Hang Seng Bank Limited	Hong Kong	2004/5/10
14	Daiwa Securities Co. Ltd.	Japan	2004/5/10
15	Bill & Melinda Gates Foundation Trust	United States	2004/7/19
16	INVESCO Asset Management Limited	United Kingdom	2004/8/4
17	Société Générale	France	2004/9/2
18	Barclays Bank PLC	United Kingdom	2004/9/15
19	Commerzbank AG	Germany	2004/9/27
20	BNP Paribas	France	2004/9/29
21	Power Corporation of Canada	Canada	2004/10/15
22	Credit Agrigole Corporate and Investment Bank	France	2004/10/15
23	Goldman Sachs Asset Management International	United Kingdom	2005/5/9
24	Martin Currie Investment Management Ltd	United Kingdom	2005/10/25
25	GIC Private Limited	Singapore	2005/10/25
26	PineBridge Investment LLC	United States	2005/11/14
27	Temasek Fullerton Alpha Pte Ltd	Singapore	2005/11/15
28	JF Asset Management Limited	Hong Kong	2005/12/28
29	The Dai-ichi Life Insurance Company, Limited	Japan	2005/12/28
30	DBS Bank Ltd	Singapore	2006/2/13
31	AMP Capital Investors Limited	Australia	2006/4/10
32	The Bank of Nova Scotia	Canada	2006/4/10
33	KBC Financial Products UK Limited	United Kingdom	2006/4/10
34	Edmond de Rothschild (France)	France	2006/4/10
35	Yale University	United States	2006/4/14
36	Morgan Stanley Investment Management Inc.	United States	2006/7/7
37	Eastspring Investment(Hong Kong) Limited	Hong Kong	2006/7/7
38	Stanford University	United States	2006/8/5
39	United Overseas Bank Limited	Singapore	2006/8/5
40	Schroder Investment Management Limited	United Kingdom	2006/8/29
41	HSBC Global Asset Management (Hong Kong) Limited	Hong Kong	2006/9/5
42	Mizuho Securities Co., Ltd	Japan	2006/9/5
43	Sumitomo Mitsui DS Asset Management Company, Limited	Japan	2006/9/25
44	UBS Asset Management (Singapore) Ltd	Singapore	2006/9/25
45	Norges Bank	Norway	2006/10/24
46	Pictet Asset Management Limited	United Kingdom	2006/10/25
47	The Trustees of Columbia University in the City of New York	United States	2008/3/12
48	Robeco Institutional Asset management B.V.	Netherlands	2008/5/5
49	State Street Global Advisors Asia Limited	Hong Kong	2008/5/16
50	KBC Asset Management N.V.	Belgium	2008/6/2
51	Platinum Investment Company Limited	Australia	2008/6/2
52	Mirae Asset Global Investments Co., Ltd.	South Korea	2008/7/25
53	Chubb INA International Holdings Ltd.	United States	2008/8/5
54	Caisse de dépôt et placement du Québec	Canada	2008/8/22
55	President and Fellows of Harvard College	United States	2008/8/22
56	Samsung Investment Trust Management Co., Ltd.	South Korea	2008/8/25
57	AllianceBernstein Limited	United Kingdom	2008/8/28
58	Oversea-Chinese Banking Corporation Limited	Singapore	2008/8/28
59	First Sentier Investors (UK) IM Limited	United Kingdom	2008/9/11
60	DAIWA Asset Management Co.	Japan	2008/9/11
61	T. Rowe Price Associates, Inc.	United States	2008/9/12
62	Shell Asset Management Company B.V.	Netherlands	2008/9/12
63	Credit Suisse AG	Switzerland	2008/10/14
64	UOB Asset Management Ltd	Singapore	2008/11/28
65	ABU Dhabi Investment Authority	United Arab Emirates	2008/12/3
66	Allianz Global Investors GmbH	Germany	2008/12/16
67	Capital International, Inc.	United States	2008/12/18
68	Mitsubishi UFJ Morgan Stanley Securities Co., Ltd.	Japan	2008/12/29
69	Hanwha Investment Trust Management Co., Ltd.	South Korea	2009/2/5
70	The Korea Development Bank	South Korea	2009/4/23
71	Woori Bank Co., Ltd	South Korea	2009/5/4
72	Bank Negara Malaysia	Malaysia	2009/5/19
73	Templeton Investment Counsel, LLC	United States	2009/6/5
74	BEA Union Investment Management Limited	Hong Kong	2009/6/18
75	"The Sumitomo Trust & Banking Co., Ltd."	Japan	2009/6/26
76	Korea Investment Trust Management Co., Ltd	South Korea	2009/7/21
77	Baring Asset Management Limited	United Kingdom	2009/8/6
78	Ashmore Investment Management Limited	United Kingdom	2009/9/14
79	BNY Mellon Asset Management International Limited	United Kingdom	2009/11/6
80	Manulife Investment Management (Hong Kong) Limited	Hong Kong	2009/11/20
81	Nomura Asset Management CO., LTD	Japan	2009/11/23
82	Woori Asset Management Corp.	South Korea	2009/12/11
83	Royal Bank of Canada	Canada	2009/12/23
84	Aviva Investors Global Services Limited	United Kingdom	2009/12/28
85	Asset Management One Co., Ltd.	Japan	2010/4/20
86	OFI Asset Management	France	2010/5/21
87	Abrdn Asia Limited	Singapore	2010/7/6
88	KB Asset Management Co., Ltd.	South Korea	2010/8/9
89	Fidelity Investments Management (Hong Kong) Limited	Hong Kong	2010/9/1
90	Hong Kong Monetary Authority	Hong Kong	2010/10/27
91	Fubon Asset Management Co., Ltd.	Taiwan	2010/10/29
92	Capital Securities Investment Trust Corporation	Taiwan	2010/10/29
93	BMO Investments Inc.	Canada	2010/12/6
94	Bank Julius Bear & Co., Ltd	Switzerland	2010/12/14
95	KTB Asset Management Co., Ltd	South Korea	2010/12/28
96	Lyxor Asset Management	France	2011/2/16
97	Yuanta Securities Investment Trust Co., Ltd.	Taiwan	2011/3/4
98	Assicurazioni Generali S.p.A.	Italy	2011/3/18
99	Banco Bilbao Vizcaya Argentaria, S.A.	Spain	2011/5/6
100	Cathay Securities Investment Trust Co., Ltd.	Taiwan	2011/6/9
101	Fuh Hwa Securities Investment Trust Co. Ltd.	Taiwan	2011/6/9
102	Comgest S.A.	France	2011/6/24
103	BlackRock Institutional Trust Company, N.A.	United States	2011/7/14
104	Amundi Hong Kong Limited	Hong Kong	2011/7/14
105	Grantham, Mayo, Van Otterloo & Co. LLC	United States	2011/8/9
106	Monetary Authority of Singapore	Singapore	2011/10/8
107	China Life Insurance Co., Ltd. (Taiwan)	Taiwan	2011/10/26
108	Shin Kong Life Insurance Co., Ltd.	Taiwan	2011/10/26
109	Princeton University	United States	2011/11/25
110	Van Eck Associates Corporation	United States	2011/12/9
111	Canada Pension Plan Investment Board	Canada	2011/12/9
112	Hansberger Global Investors, Inc.	United States	2011/12/13
113	EARNEST Partners LLC	United States	2011/12/13
114	Bank of Thailand	Thailand	2011/12/16
115		Hong Kong	2011/12/21
116		Hong Kong	2011/12/21
117		Hong Kong	2011/12/21
118	Kuwait Investment Authority	Kuwait	2011/12/21
119	Northern Trust Global Investments Limited	United Kingdom	2011/12/21
120	Taiwan Life Insurance Co., Ltd.	Taiwan	2011/12/21
121	The Bank of Korea	South Korea	2011/12/21
122	HFT Investment Management (Hong Kong) Ltd.	Hong Kong	2011/12/21
123	China Asset Management (Hong Kong) Ltd.	Hong Kong	2011/12/21
124	China Universal Asset Management (Hong Kong) Co., Ltd.	Hong Kong	2011/12/21
125	Harvest Global Investments Ltd.	Hong Kong	2011/12/21
126	CSOP Asset Management Ltd.	Hong Kong	2011/12/21
127	E Fund Management (Hong Kong) Co., Ltd.	Hong Kong	2011/12/21
128	China International Capital Corporation (Hong Kong) Ltd.	Hong Kong	2011/12/22
129	Guosen Securities (Hong Kong) Financial Holdings Co., Ltd.	Hong Kong	2011/12/22
130	Everbright Securities Financial Holdings Ltd.	Hong Kong	2011/12/22
131	Huatai Financial Holdings (Hong Kong) Ltd.	Hong Kong	2011/12/22
132	Guotai Junan Financial Holdings Ltd.	Hong Kong	2011/12/22
133	Haitong International Holdings Ltd.	Hong Kong	2011/12/22
134	GF Holdings (Hong Kong) Co., Ltd.	Hong Kong	2011/12/22
135	China Merchants Securities International Co., Ltd	Hong Kong	2011/12/22
136	Shenwan Hongyuan (International) Holdings Limited	Hong Kong	2011/12/22
137	CITIC Securities International Co., Ltd.	Hong Kong	2011/12/22
138	Essence International Financial Holdings Ltd.	Hong Kong	2011/12/22
139	Guoyuan International Holdings Ltd.	Hong Kong	2011/12/22
140	Ontario Teachers' Pension Plan Board	Canada	2011/12/22
141	Russell Investments Ireland Limited	Ireland	2011/12/28
142	Korea Investment Corporation	South Korea	2011/12/28
143	Metzler Asset Management GmbH	Germany	2011/12/31
144	VI Asset Management Co., Ltd	South Korea	2011/12/31
145	National Pension Service	South Korea	2012/1/5
146	Shinhan BNP Paribas Asset Management Co., Ltd.	South Korea	2012/1/5
147	Mercuries Life Insurance Co, Ltd	Taiwan	2012/1/30
148	Prudential Financial Securities Investment Trust Enterprise	Taiwan	2012/1/31
149	Principal Global Investors LLC	United States	2012/1/31
150	TransGlobe Life Insurance Inc.	Taiwan	2012/2/3
151	Public Mutual Berhad	Malaysia	2012/2/3
152	Meiji Yasuda Asset Management Company Ltd.	Japan	2012/2/27
153	Cathay Life Insurance Co., Ltd.	Taiwan	2012/2/28
154	Sumitomo Mitsui Banking Corporation	Japan	2012/2/28
155	Fubon Life Insurance Co. Ltd	Taiwan	2012/3/1
156	AIA Company Limited	Hong Kong	2012/3/5
157	Neuberger Berman Europe Limited	United Kingdom	2012/3/5
158	KHAZANAH NASIONAL BERHAD	Malaysia	2012/3/7
159	Capital Research and Management Company	United States	2012/3/9
160	Tokio Marine Asset Management Co., Ltd	Japan	2012/3/14
161	Hana Financial Investment Co., Ltd	South Korea	2012/3/29
162	Genesis Asset Managers, LLP	United States	2012/3/30
163	City of London Investment Managementi Company Limited	United Kingdom	2012/3/30
164	JPMorgan Asset Management (UK) Limited	United Kingdom	2012/3/30
165	Okasan Asset Management Co., Ltd	Japan	2012/3/30
166	Prescient Investment Management PTY LTD	South Africa	2012/4/18
167	Dongbu Asset Management Co., Ltd.	South Korea	2012/4/20
168	Henderson Global Investors Limited	United Kingdom	2012/4/28
169	Eurizon Capital S.A.	Luxembourg	2012/5/2
170	BOCI-Prudential Asset Management Limited	Hong Kong	2012/5/3
171	Fullerton Fund Management Company Ltd	Singapore	2012/5/4
172	Lion Global Investors Limited	Singapore	2012/5/7
173	BG FUND MANAGEMENT LUXEMBOURG S.A.	Luxembourg	2012/5/23
174	William Blair & Company, L.L.C.	United States	2012/5/24
175	Investec Asset Management Limited	United Kingdom	2012/5/28
176	ING Investment Management Aisa Pacific (Hong Kong) Limited	Hong Kong	2012/6/4
177	Mitsubishi UFJ Kokusai Asset Management Co., Ltd.	Japan	2012/6/4
178	BOC Group Life Assurance Company Limited	Hong Kong	2012/7/12
179	Hall Capital Partners LLC	United States	2012/8/6
180	Board of Regents of The University of Texas System	United States	2012/8/6
181	Nan Shan Life Insurance Company, Ltd.	Taiwan	2012/8/6
182	ICBC Credit Suisse Asset Management (International) Co., Ltd.	Hong Kong	2012/8/7
183	GF International Investment Management Ltd.	Hong Kong	2012/8/7
184	Suva	Switzerland	2012/8/13
185	British Columbia Investment Management Corporation	Canada	2012/8/17
186	Value Partners Hong Kong Limited	Hong Kong	2012/8/21
187	Ontario Pension Board	Canada	2012/8/29
188	The Church Pension Fund	United States	2012/8/31
189	Macquarie Bank Limited	Australia	2012/9/4
190	Haitong International Asset Management (HK) Limited	Hong Kong	2012/9/20
191	IDG CAPITAL MANAGEMENT (HK) LIMITED	Hong Kong	2012/9/20
192	Andra AP-fonden	Sweden	2012/9/20
193	Duke University	United States	2012/9/24
194	Qatar Holding LLC	Qatar	2012/9/25
195	EFG Bank AG	Switzerland	2012/9/26
196	BlackRock Asset Management North Asia Limited	Hong Kong	2012/10/26
197	Cutwater Investor Services Corporation	United States	2012/10/26
198	OrbiMed Advisors LLC	United States	2012/10/26
199	CIFM Asset Management (Hong Kong) Ltd.	Hong Kong	2012/10/26
200	New Silk Road Investment Pte. Ltd.	Singapore	2012/10/26
201	JPMorgan Asset Management Taiwan	Taiwan	2012/11/5
202	AEGON USA Investment Management, LLC	United States	2012/11/5
203	CDH Investment Advisory Private Limited	Singapore	2012/11/7
204	Skandinaviska Enskilda Banken AB(publ)	Sweden	2012/11/12
205	TD Asset Management Inc.	Canada	2012/11/21
206	Uni-President Assets Management Corporation	Taiwan	2012/11/21
207	APS Asset Management Pte Ltd	Singapore	2012/11/27
208	CLSA Asset Management Limited	Hong Kong	2012/12/11
209	Pacific Alliance Investment Management (HK) Limited	Hong Kong	2012/12/11
210	HHLR Management Pte. Ltd	Singapore	2012/12/11
211	SinoPac Securities Investment Trust Co., Ltd	Taiwan	2012/12/13
212	Fullgoal Asset Management (HK) Ltd.	Hong Kong	2012/12/17
213	East Capital AB	Sweden	2013/1/7
214	First Securities Investment Trust Co., Ltd.	Taiwan	2013/1/24
215	UBS Asset Management (Hong Kong) Ltd	Hong Kong	2013/1/24
216	PIMCO Asia Pte Ltd	Singapore	2013/1/24
217	EJS Investment Management S.A.	Switzerland	2013/1/31
218	Guotai Junan Assets (Asia) Limited	Hong Kong	2013/2/21
219	LFM Global Investment (Hong Kong) Co., Ltd.	Hong Kong	2013/2/22
220	CMS Asset Management (HK) Co., Limited	Hong Kong	2013/2/22
221	Taikang Asset Management (HK) Company Limited	Hong Kong	2013/2/22
222	KB Securities co., Ltd.	South Korea	2013/3/22
223	ICBC Asset Management (Global) Company Limited	Hong Kong	2013/3/25
224	CCB International Asset Management Limited	Hong Kong	2013/3/25
225	Azimut Investments S.A.	Luxembourg	2013/4/11
226	Asia Capital Reinsurance Group Pte. Ltd.	Singapore	2013/4/11
227	Industrial Securities (Hong Kong) Financial Holdings Ltd.	Hong Kong	2013/4/25
228	Taishin Securities Investment Trust Co., Ltd.	Taiwan	2013/4/27
229	HSBC Global Asset Management (Taiwan) Limited	Taiwan	2013/5/10
230	ABCI Asset Management Limited	Hong Kong	2013/5/15
231	Taiping Assets Management (HK) Company Limited	Hong Kong	2013/5/15
232	Soochow Securities (International) Financial Holding Limited	Hong Kong	2013/5/16
233	China International Capital Corporation Hong Kong Asset Management Limited	Hong Kong	2013/5/16
234	Orient Finance Holdings (Hong Kong) Ltd.	Hong Kong	2013/5/23
235	China Everbright Assets Management Limited	Hong Kong	2013/5/30
236	Hang Seng Investment Management Limited	Hong Kong	2013/6/4
237	Mega International Investment Trust Co., Ltd.	Taiwan	2013/6/4
238	BNP Paribas Investment Partners Asia Limited	Hong Kong	2013/6/19
239	University of Notre Dame du Lac	United States	2013/6/19
240	HGNH International Asset Management Co., Limited	Hong Kong	2013/7/15
241	Changjiang Securities Holdings (HK) Ltd.	Hong Kong	2013/7/15
242	Newport Asia LLC	United States	2013/7/15
243	HUA NAN INVESTMENT TRUST CORPORATION	Taiwan	2013/7/15
244	Greenwoods Asset Management Hong Kong Limited	Hong Kong	2013/7/15
245	BOCHK Asset Management Limited	Hong Kong	2013/7/15
246	Ping An of China Asset Management (Hong Kong) Company Limited	Hong Kong	2013/7/19
247	Cinda International Asset Management Limited	Hong Kong	2013/7/19
248	Income Partners Asset Management (HK) Limited	Hong Kong	2013/7/19
249	The Bank of East Asia, Limited	Hong Kong	2013/8/15
250	SinoPac Asset Management (Asia) Ltd.	Hong Kong	2013/8/15
251	BOCOM International Asset Management Limited	Hong Kong	2013/8/20
252	China Orient International Asset Management Limited	Hong Kong	2013/8/20
253	CTBC Life Insurance Co., Ltd.	Taiwan	2013/8/20
254	Keywise Capital Management (HK) Limited	Hong Kong	2013/8/20
255	FUBON INSURANCE COMPANY LIMITED	Taiwan	2013/8/26
256	Alta Advisers Limited	United Kingdom	2013/8/26
257	Flowering Tree Investment Management Pte. Ltd.	Singapore	2013/8/26
258	PineBridge Investments Hong Kong Limited	Hong Kong	2013/9/26
259	Chong Hing Bank Limited	Hong Kong	2013/9/26
260	Mayo Clinic	United States	2013/9/29
261	Guosen Securities (HK) Asset Management Company Limited	Hong Kong	2013/9/29
262	Government Pension Fund	Thailand	2013/10/24
263	CSAM Asset Management Pte Ltd	Singapore	2013/10/30
264	JPMorgan Asset Management (Asia Pacific) Limited	Hong Kong	2013/10/30
265	Mirae Asset Global Investments (Hong Kong) Limited	Hong Kong	2013/10/30
266	SHANGHAI INTERNATIONAL ASSET MANAGEMENT(HONG KONG) COMPANY LIMITED	Hong Kong	2013/10/30
267	China Securities (International) Finance Holding Co., Ltd.	Hong Kong	2013/10/30
268	SeaTown Holdings International Pte. Ltd.	Singapore	2013/10/30
269	China Life Franklin Asset Management Co., Limited	Hong Kong	2013/10/30
270	UBS Hana Asset Management Co., Ltd.	South Korea	2013/10/31
271	Cathay United Bank Co., Ltd.	Taiwan	2013/11/7
272	Bank of Lithuania	Lithuania	2013/11/23
273	Franklin Templeton SinoAM SIM Inc.	Taiwan	2013/11/23
274	CTBC Bank Co., Ltd.	Taiwan	2013/11/23
275	Sinolink Securities (Hong Kong) Company Limited	Hong Kong	2013/12/6
276	China Galaxy Financial Holding Co., Ltd.	Hong Kong	2013/12/11
277	Wing Lung Asset Management Limited	Hong Kong	2013/12/30
278	Hwabao WP Asset Management (Hong Kong) Co., Limited	Hong Kong	2014/1/20
279	Enhanced Investment Products Limited	Hong Kong	2014/1/20
280	The Washington University	United States	2014/1/23
281	Monetary Authority of Macao	Macau	2014/1/27
282	Stifel Nicolaus & Company, Inc.	United States	2014/1/27
283	NTUC Income Insurance Co-operative Limited	Singapore	2014/1/27
284	Invesco PowerShares Capital Management LLC	United States	2014/1/27
285	Swiss RE Asia PTE. Ltd.	Switzerland	2014/1/27
286	Nordea Investment Management AB	Sweden	2014/1/27
287	Galaxy Asset Management (H.K.) Limited	Hong Kong	2014/3/6
288	Schroder Investment Management (Hong Kong) Limited	Hong Kong	2014/3/6
289	JKO Asset Management Co., Ltd.	Taiwan	2014/3/11
290	Cascade Investment, L.L.C.	United States	2014/3/11
291	Matthews International Capital Management, LLC	Hong Kong	2014/3/12
292	Oppenheimer Funds, Inc.	United States	2014/3/12
293	Yue Xiu Asset Management Limited	United States	2014/3/19
294	Cephei Capital Management (Hong Kong) Limited	Hong Kong	2014/3/26
295	Overlook Investments Limited	Hong Kong	2014/3/27
296	Pureheart Capital Asia Limited	Hong Kong	2014/4/8
297	China Merchants Asset Management (Hong Kong) Company Limited	Hong Kong	2014/4/15
298	Nikko Asset Management Asia Ltd	Hong Kong	2014/5/21
299	Phillip Capital Management (HK) Ltd	Singapore	2014/5/21
300	Taishin International Bank	Hong Kong	2014/6/3
301	Changsheng Fund Management (H.K.) Limited	Taiwan	2014/6/3
302	BlackRock Advisors (UK) Limited	Hong Kong	2014/6/12
303	HSBC Global Asset Management (UK) Limited	United Kingdom	2014/6/13
304	Citigroup First Investment Management Limited	United Kingdom	2014/6/16
305	Zhongtai Financial International Limited	Hong Kong	2014/6/16
306	Samsung Asset Management (Hong Kong) Limited	Hong Kong	2014/6/27
307	ASSETPLUS Investment Management Co., Ltd.	Hong Kong	2014/6/30
308	New China Asset Management (Hong Kong) Limited	South Korea	2014/7/24
309	The Bloomberg Family Foundation Inc.	Hong Kong	2014/7/24
310	Masterlink Securities (Hong Kong) Corporation Limited	United States	2014/7/25
311	The Rock Creek Group, LP.	Hong Kong	2014/7/28
312	Guotai Junan Fund Management Limited	United States	2014/7/28
313	Caitong International Asset Management Co., Limited	Hong Kong	2014/8/11
314	AllianceBernstein Hong Kong Limited	Hong Kong	2014/8/12
315	Yuanta Securities (Hong Kong) Company Limited	Hong Kong	2014/8/12
316	Abrdn Asia Limited	Hong Kong	2014/8/15
317	BNP Paribas Asset Management	Singapore	2014/8/15
318	Ninety One UK Limited	France	2014/8/27
319	Carmignac Gestion	United Kingdom	2014/8/28
320	Massachusetts Institute of Technology	France	2014/9/19
321	Viking Global Hong Kong Limited	United States	2014/9/19
322	Goldman Sachs International	Hong Kong	2014/9/22
323	AXA Fund Management S.A.	United Kingdom	2014/9/22
324	Rongtong Global Investment Limited	Luxembourg	2014/10/8
325	Shanghai Commercial Bank Limited	Hong Kong	2014/10/8
326	CCTIC International Limited	Hong Kong	2014/10/13
327	Hamon Asset Management Limited	Hong Kong	2014/10/31
328	Cederberg Capital UK LLP	Hong Kong	2014/11/19
329	Baring Asset Management (Asia) Limited	United Kingdom	2014/11/19
330	Principal Global Investors (Hong Kong) Limited	Hong Kong	2014/11/25
331	Schroder Investment Management (Singapore) Ltd	Hong Kong	2014/11/25
332	Mirae Asset Global Investment Co., Ltd	Singapore	2014/12/1
333	Wellington Management International Limited	South Korea	2014/12/4
334	BNS Asia Limited	United Kingdom	2014/12/10
335	JPMorgan Asset Management (Singapore) Limited	Singapore	2014/12/12
336	NH-AMUNDI Asset Management Co., Ltd.	Singapore	2014/12/24
337	Total Invest Group Asset Management (Hong Kong) Limited	South Korea	2014/12/26
338	Shenwan Hongyuan Asset Management (Asia) Limited	Hong Kong	2014/12/26
339	Trustees of the University of Pennsylvania	Hong Kong	2014/12/30
340	GF Asset Management (Hong Kong) Limited	United States	2015/1/5
341	Neuberger Berman Singapore Pte. Limited	Hong Kong	2015/1/7
342	TRUSTON Asset Management Co., Ltd.	Singapore	2015/1/22
343	Daishin Asset Management Co., Ltd.	South Korea	2015/1/22
344	Munsun Asset Management (Asia) Limited	South Korea	2015/1/22
345	Invesco Hong Kong Limited	Hong Kong	2015/1/22
346	MY Asset Investment Management Co., Ltd.	Hong Kong	2015/2/6
347	Deutsche Asset & Wealth Management Investment GmbH	South Korea	2015/2/6
348	Shinhan Investment Corporation	Germany	2015/2/6
349	Heungkuk Asset Management	South Korea	2015/2/16
350	Aviva Investors Asia Pte. Limited	South Korea	2015/2/16
351	China Construction Bank (London) Limited	Singapore	2015/2/17
352	Target Asset Management Pte Ltd	United Kingdom	2015/2/17
353	E.SUN COMMERCIAL BANK, Ltd.	Singapore	2015/2/27
354	KKR Singapore Pte. Ltd.	Taiwan	2015/2/27
355	Vanguard Investment Australia Ltd	Singapore	2015/3/2
356	Genesis Investment Management, LLP	Australia	2015/3/2
357	MIRAE ASSET SECURITIES CO., Ltd.	United Kingdom	2015/3/6
358	The Regents of the University of California	South Korea	2015/3/25
359	Reliance Asset Management (Singapore) Pte. Ltd.	United States	2015/3/25
360	Samsung Life Insurance Co., Ltd.	Singapore	2015/3/31
361	Kyobo AXA Investment Managers Co., Ltd.	South Korea	2015/3/31
362	Meritz Asset Management Co., Ltd.	South Korea	2015/4/2
363	Allianz Global Investors Singapore Limited	South Korea	2015/4/8
364	Prudence Investment Management (Hong Kong) Ltd.	Singapore	2015/4/8
365	Samsung Securities Co., Ltd	Hong Kong	2015/4/8
366	GAM International Management Limited	South Korea	2015/4/17
367	HI Asset Management	United Kingdom	2015/4/17
368	Harvest Global Investment (UK) Limited	South Korea	2015/5/6
369	Brunei Investment Agency	United Kingdom	2015/5/6
370	Bank of Taiwan	Brunei	2015/5/7
371	Springs Capital (Hong Kong) Limited	Taiwan	2015/5/20
372	Allianz Global Investors Taiwan Limited	Hong Kong	2015/5/20
373	Swiss Reinsurance Company Ltd	Taiwan	2015/5/21
374	Essence Asset Management (Hong Kong) Limited	Switzerland	2015/6/2
375	Jih Sun Securities Investment Trust Co., Ltd	Hong Kong	2015/6/2
376	BlueBay Asset Management LLP	Taiwan	2015/6/2
377	KB Asset Management Co., Ltd	United Kingdom	2015/6/26
378	CI Investments Inc.	South Korea	2015/6/29
379	General Oriental Investments SA	Canada	2015/6/29
380	Yuanta Securities Korea Co., Ltd.	Switzerland	2015/6/29
381	Daishin Securities Co., Ltd	South Korea	2015/7/28
382	Union Bancaire Gestion Institutionnelle (France) SAS	South Korea	2015/7/28
383	Korea Investment & Securities Co., Ltd.	France	2015/7/28
384	IBK Securities Co., Ltd.	South Korea	2015/8/10
385	Samsung Fire & Marine Insurance Co., Ltd.	South Korea	2015/8/10
386	Amundi Singapore Limited	South Korea	2015/8/31
387	Multi Asset Global Investment Co., Ltd.	Singapore	2015/8/31
388	Fidelidade-Companhia de Seguros, S.A.	South Korea	2015/8/31
389	Amundi Asset Management	Portugal	2015/8/31
390	Kiwoom Asset Management Co., Ltd	France	2015/9/17
391	Hyundai Investments Co., Ltd	South Korea	2015/9/23
392	TBP Investment Advisory (HK) Limited	South Korea	2015/10/9
393	Industrial and Commercial Bank of China (Europe) S.A.	Hong Kong	2015/10/12
394	Eastspring Securities Investment Trust Co. Ltd.	Luxembourg	2015/11/2
395	Bank of China (Luxembourg) S.A.	Taiwan	2015/11/2
396	PineBridge Investments Management Taiwan Limited	Luxembourg	2015/11/3
397	GF International Asset Management (UK) Company Limited	Taiwan	2015/11/24
398	Polunin Capital Partners Limited	United Kingdom	2015/12/10
399	BlackRock (Singapore) Limited	United Kingdom	2016/1/13
400	Nomura Asset Management Deutschland KAG mbH	Singapore	2016/1/25
401	Credit Industriel et Commercial S.A.	Germany	2016/2/1
402	Generali Investments Luxembourg S.A.	France	2016/2/22
403	OCTO Asset Management	Luxembourg	2016/2/22
404	Avanda Investment Management Pte. Ltd.	France	2016/2/26
405	Eastspring Investments (Singapore) Limited	Singapore	2016/3/15
406	Guotai Global Investments Limited	Singapore	2016/3/17
407	GF Financial Markets (UK) Limited	Hong Kong	2016/3/17
408	AXA Investment Managers Paris	United Kingdom	2016/4/1
409	Phillip Capital Management (S) Ltd	France	2016/4/1
410	First Commercial Bank, Ltd.	Singapore	2016/4/26
411	Midas International Asset Management Ltd.	Taiwan	2016/5/3
412	Fidelity Investments (Singapore) Limited	South Korea	2016/5/6
413	Edmond de Rothschild Asset Management (France)	Singapore	2016/6/6
414	Robeco Luxembourg S.A.	France	2016/6/8
415	Harveston Asset Management Pte. Ltd.	Luxembourg	2016/6/8
416	Yuanta Securities Co., Ltd.	Singapore	2016/7/19
417	ICBC International Asset Management Limited Company	Taiwan	2016/7/19
418	Eugene Investment & Securities Co., Ltd.	Hong Kong	2016/7/19
419	China Everbright Securities Asset Management Limited	South Korea	2016/8/12
420	Shinhan Bank Co., Ltd.	Hong Kong	2016/8/12
421	The Vanguard Group, Inc.	South Korea	2016/8/22
422	Kasikorn Asset Management Co., Ltd	United States	2016/9/1
423	China Post & Capital Global Asset Management Limited	Thailand	2016/9/9
424	J.P. Morgan Securities plc	Hong Kong	2016/9/9
425	Russell Investment Management Limited	United Kingdom	2016/9/28
426	BlackRock Fund Advisors	Australia	2016/10/27
427	Lemanik Asset Management S.A.	United States	2016/11/25
428	Amundi Luxembourg S.A.	Luxembourg	2016/11/25
429	CMB International Asset Management Limited	Luxembourg	2016/12/20
430	BOB Scotia International Asset Management Company Limited	Hong Kong	2017/1/5
431	Principal Asset Management Berhad	Hong Kong	2017/1/10
432	Aware Super Pty Ltd	Malaysia	2017/1/18
433	Haitong Bank, S.A.	Australia	2017/1/18
434	VanEck Investments Limited	Portugal	2017/2/13
435	China Industrial Securities International Asset Management Limited	Australia	2017/2/23
436	Shenwan Hongyuan Singapore Private Limited	Hong Kong	2017/6/19
437	Acadian Asset Management LLC	Singapore	2017/7/27
438	Shanxi Securities International Asset Management Limited	United States	2017/7/27
439	Singapore Consortium Investment Management Limited	Hong Kong	2017/8/14
440	WisdomTree Asset Management, Inc.	Singapore	2017/8/18
441	APG Asset Management N.V.	United States	2017/10/16
442	Highclere International Investors LLP	Netherlands	2017/11/28
443	Bridgewater Associates, LP	United Kingdom	2018/1/8
444	State Street Global Advisors Ireland Limited	United States	2018/5/25
445	State Street Global Advisors Trust Company	Ireland	2018/5/31
446	SSGA Funds Management, Inc.	United States	2018/5/31
447	State Street Global Advisors Limited	United States	2018/5/31
448	Foresee Global Asset Management (HK) Limited	United Kingdom	2018/5/31
449	WisdomTree Management limited	Hong Kong	2018/7/16
450	Zhongtai International Asset Management Limited	Ireland	2018/8/15
451	Yaozhi Asset Management International Co., Limited	Hong Kong	2018/8/15
452	Sumitomo Mitsui Banking Corporation	Hong Kong	2018/9/6
453	Yinhua International Capital Management	Japan	2018/9/30
454	PICC Asset Management (Hong Kong) Company Limited	Hong Kong	2018/10/8
455	China Post Global (UK) Limited	Hong Kong	2018/10/12
456	Bank J.Safra Sarasin Ltd	Hong Kong	2018/10/23
457	Soochow CSSD Asset Management (Asia) Pte. Ltd	Switzerland	2018/11/20
458	Snow Lake Capital (HK) Limited	Singapore	2018/12/3
459	Fidelity Management & Research Company LLC	Hong Kong	2018/12/14
460	BBL Asset Management Co., LTD	United States	2018/12/18
461	PineBridge Investments Ireland Limited	Thailand	2019/2/15
462	Zeta Capital (H.K.) Limited	Ireland	2019/2/26
463	International Monetary Fund	Hong Kong	2019/2/27
464	Nomura Singapore Limited	IMF	2019/3/5
465	Lakefront Asset Management (HK) Co., Limited	Singapore	2019/3/12
466	Right Time Asset Management Company Limited	Hong Kong	2019/4/17
467	MUFG Bank, Ltd.	Hong Kong	2019/4/17
468	Weshare Asset Management Limited	Japan	2019/4/23
469	International Finance Corporation	Hong Kong	2019/4/28
470	Krung Thai Asset Management Public Company Limited	IFC	2019/7/1
471	Vision Capital Investment Management Limited	Thailand	2019/7/3
472	Founder Asset Management (Hong Kong) Limited	Hong Kong	2019/7/17
473	Xin Yongan International Asset Management Company Limited	Hong Kong	2019/8/19
474	Marshall Wace LLP	Hong Kong	2019/8/22
475	Entropy Asset Management Limited	United Kingdom	2019/8/22
476	SBI Asset Management Co., Ltd	Hong Kong	2019/11/8
477	Tongfang Securities Limited	Japan	2019/11/14
478	The Vanderbilt University	Hong Kong	2019/11/26
479	Coatue Management, L.L.C.	United States	2019/11/26
480	Fosun Hani Securities Limited	United States	2019/12/17
481	Himalaya Capital Management LLC.	Hong Kong	2019/12/31
482	EIP Alpha Limited	United States	2020/2/12
483	Oasis Management (Hong Kong)	Hong Kong	2020/2/25
484	Goldstream Capital Management Limited	Hong Kong	2020/3/25
485	Join Asset Global Asset Management. Co. Ltd.	Hong Kong	2020/4/1
486	Sumitomo Mitsui Trust Asset Management Co., Ltd.	South Korea	2020/4/1
487	Wonderland International Asset Management Limited	Japan	2020/4/1
488	Key Square Capital Management LLC	Hong Kong	2020/4/7
489	WT Asset Management Limited	United States	2020/4/13
490	Baillie Gifford Overseas Limited	Hong Kong	2020/5/7
491	First Sentier Investors (Hong Kong) Limited	United Kingdom	2020/5/11
492	Astignes Capital Asia Pte. Ltd.	Hong Kong	2020/5/13
493	C.M. Capital Advisors, LLC.	Singapore	2020/5/13
494	CCB Securities Limited	United States	2020/5/13
495	Jane Street Hong Kong Limited	Hong Kong	2020/6/2
496	Empyrean Management (Hong Kong) Limited	Hong Kong	2020/6/2
497	SPDB International Investment Management Limited	Hong Kong	2020/8/13
498	AHL Partners LLP	Hong Kong	2020/8/27
499	Gresham Investment Management LLC	United Kingdom	2020/8/27
500	T. Rowe Price International Ltd	United States	2020/8/27
501	Ninety One North America, Inc.	United Kingdom	2020/9/7
502	Holly International Asset Management Company Limited	United States	2020/9/10
503	Qube Research and Technologies Limited	Hong Kong	2020/9/27
504	L&R Capital Limited	United Kingdom	2020/9/28
505	Laurion Capital Management LP.	Hong Kong	2020/10/10
506	Winton Capital Management Limited	United States	2020/10/10
507	Harding Loevner LP	United Kingdom	2020/10/15
508	Rui Da International Asset Management (Hong Kong) Limited	United States	2020/11/16
509	Hao Advisors Management Limited	Hong Kong	2020/11/16
510	LAV Global Management Company Limited	Hong Kong	2020/11/16
511	Samsung Venture Investment Corporation	Cayman Islands	2020/11/16
512	Optiver Australia Pty Limited	South Korea	2020/11/16
513	CRIC Securities Company Limited	Australia	2020/11/16
514	Neo-Criterion Capital Singapore Pte Ltd	Hong Kong	2020/11/16
515	Boyu Capital Investment Management Co., Limited	Singapore	2020/11/16
516	Artisan Partners Limited Partnership	Hong Kong	2020/11/16
517	Northwest Investment Management (Hong Kong) Limited	United States	2020/11/16
518	Valliance Asset Management Limited	Hong Kong	2020/11/16
519	Broad Peak Investment Advisers Pte Ltd	Hong Kong	2020/11/16
520	JQ Securities (Hong Kong) Limited	Singapore	2020/11/16
521	United Gain Investment Limited	Hong Kong	2020/11/17
522	Longitude Asia Limited	Hong Kong	2020/11/17
523	Gamma Securities Limited	Hong Kong	2020/11/17
524	Solomon Capital Management Limited	Hong Kong	2020/11/23
525	Smart Wise Advisors Limited	Hong Kong	2020/11/23
526	Mirae Asset Securities (HK) Limited	Hong Kong	2020/11/25
527	Bank of China (New Zealand) Limited	Hong Kong	2020/12/3
528	CMBC Asset Management Company Limited	New Zealand	2020/12/3
529	Warburg Pincus LLC	Hong Kong	2020/12/7
530	China PA Asset Management (Hong Kong) Company Limited	United States	2020/12/7
531	VS Partners (Hong Kong) Co., Limited	Hong Kong	2020/12/7
532	Greatpage Capital Company Limited	Hong Kong	2020/12/10
533	Athenaeum Private Limited	Hong Kong	2020/12/15
534	CCB Principal Asset Management(Hong Kong)Co.Limited	Singapore	2020/12/15
535	CTI Capital Hong Kong Limited	Hong Kong	2020/12/15
536	DCP Management, Ltd.	Hong Kong	2020/12/15
537	Bin Yuan Capital Limited	Cayman Islands	2020/12/14
538	Zhong Ou Asset Management Limited	Hong Kong	2020/12/14
539	Carlyle Mauritius CIS Investment Management Limited	Hong Kong	2020/12/14
540	BFAM Partners (Hong Kong) Limited	Mauritius	2020/12/14
541	High-Flyer Capital Management (Hong Kong) Limited	Hong Kong	2020/12/14
542	Sequoia Capital China Advisors Limited	Hong Kong	2020/12/14
543	AVA International Limited	Cayman Islands	2020/12/14
544	MY.Alpha Management HK Advisors Limited	Hong Kong	2020/12/14
545	Systematica Investments Limited	Hong Kong	2020/12/14
546	PAG Asia Capital Limited	Jersey	2020/12/14
547	Kadensa Capital Limited	Cayman Islands	2020/12/14
548	Trade Master Securities (Hong Kong) Limited	Hong Kong	2020/12/14
549	Krane Funds Advisors, LLC.	Hong Kong	2020/12/14
550	Lombard Odier Asset Management (Europe) Limited	United States	2020/12/14
551	Gordian Capital Singapore Private Limited	United Kingdom	2020/12/25
552	Nexus Investment Advisors Limited	Singapore	2020/12/25
553	BRAM – Bradesco Asset Management S.A. DTVM	Hong Kong	2021/1/5
554	CEB International Asset Management Corporation Limited	Brazil	2021/1/5
555	Hong Kong Asset Management Limited	Hong Kong	2021/1/5
556	Funde Asset Management (Hong Kong) Company Limited	Hong Kong	2021/1/15
557	PGIM Quantitative Solution LLC	Hong Kong	2021/1/15
558	Dongxing Securities (Hong Kong) Asset Management Company Limited	United States	2021/1/26
559	Yongan Guofu Asset Management (Hong Kong) Company limited	Hong Kong	2021/1/26
560	Ortus Capital Management Limited	Hong Kong	2021/2/3
561	SUSQUEHANNA PACIFIC PTY LTD	Hong Kong	2021/2/9
562	Shin Kong Investment Trust Co., Ltd.	Australia	2021/2/9
563	HRTC Limited	Taiwan	2021/2/10
564	Henderson Rowe Limited	Cayman Islands	2021/2/10
565	Brilliance Asset Management Limited	United Kingdom	2021/2/10
566	Davidson Kempner Capital Management LP	Hong Kong	2021/2/10
567	Tairen Capital Limited	United States	2021/2/10
568	Rayliant Asset Management Limited	Hong Kong	2021/2/10
569	Millennium Capital Management (Singapore) Pte. Ltd.	Hong Kong	2021/2/10
570	Janchor Partners Limited	Singapore	2021/2/25
571	Peel Hunt	Hong Kong	2021/3/4
572	Factorial Management Limited	United Kingdom	2021/3/4
573	Jinde Asset Management (Hong Kong) Ltd	Hong Kong	2021/3/16
574	MAPS CAPITAL MANAGEMENT LIMITED	Hong Kong	2021/3/16
575	LIM Advisors Limited	Hong Kong	2021/3/16
576	Premia Partners Company Limited	Hong Kong	2021/3/16
577	Oberweis Asset Management, Inc.	Hong Kong	2021/3/16
578	Zhongtai International Asset Management (Singapore) Pte. Ltd.	United States	2021/3/16
579	Long Corridor Asset Management Limited	Singapore	2021/3/18
580	Fiera Capital (Asia) Hong Kong Limited	Hong Kong	2021/3/18
581	Victory Securities Company Limited	Hong Kong	2021/3/17
582	AROHI ASSET MANAGEMENT PTE LTD	Hong Kong	2021/3/22
583	Anatole Investment Management Limited	Singapore	2021/3/26
584	CASH ASSET MANAGEMENT LIMITED	Hong Kong	2021/3/31
585	FountainCap Research & Investment (Hong Kong) Co., Limited	Hong Kong	2021/4/2
586	Yunqi Capital Limited	Hong Kong	2021/4/12
587	Central Asset Investments and Management Holdings (HK) Limited	Hong Kong	2021/4/20
588	SinoPac Securities Corporation	Hong Kong	2021/4/20
589	Jump Trading Pacific Pte Ltd	Taiwan	2021/4/20
590	Derivatives China (Hong Kong) Limited	Singapore	2021/4/20
591	Baillie Gifford & Co	Hong Kong	2021/4/20
592	Hung Sing Securities Limited	United Kingdom	2021/4/30
593	Blackstone Alternative Solutions L.L.C.	Hong Kong	2021/4/30
594	DNCA FINANCE	United States	2021/5/14
595	China Tonghai Asset Management Limited	France	2021/5/14
596	Eclipse Futures (HK) Limited	Hong Kong	2021/5/19
597	SITCOAM (HONG KONG) HOLDINGS LIMITED	Hong Kong	2021/5/19
598	Blue Pool Capital Limited	Hong Kong	2021/5/21
599	HUI XUN ASSET MANAGEMENT PTE LTD	Hong Kong	2021/5/26
600	GLP Capital Investment 4 (HK) Limited	Singapore	2021/5/28
601	ROY ENTERPRISES LIMITED	Hong Kong	2021/5/6
602	OP Investment Management Limited	Hong Kong	2021/6/28
603	Pinpoint Asset Management Limited	Hong Kong	2021/6/17
604	WCM Investment Management, LLC	Hong Kong	2021/6/16
605	Mackenzie Financial Corporation	United States	2021/6/17
606	Allianz Global Investors Asia Pacific Limited	Canada	2021/6/11
607	Al Mehwar Commercial Investments L.L.C.	Hong Kong	2021/6/10
608	SILVERBRICKS SECURITIES COMPANY LIMITED	United Arab Emirates	2021/6/16
609	Quaero Capital LLP	Hong Kong	2021/6/17
610	PEDDER STREET INVESTMENT MANAGEMENT LIMITED	United Kingdom	2021/6/18
611	Power Pacific Investment Management Inc.	Hong Kong	2021/6/24
612	De Tiger Capital Limited	Canada	2021/6/28
613	Jasper Capital Hong Kong Limited	Hong Kong	2021/6/24
614	Pleiad Investment Advisors Limited	Hong Kong	2021/6/24
615	Dynamic Technology Lab Private Limited	Hong Kong	2021/6/4
616	Balyasny Asset Management L.P.	Singapore	2021/7/5
617	Taichung Bank Securities Investment Trust Co., Ltd.	United States	2021/7/5
618	China Pinnacle Equity Management Limited	Taiwan	2021/7/5
619	Lake Bleu Capital (Hong Kong) Limited	Hong Kong	2021/7/5
620	Dymon Asia Capital (Singapore) Pte. Ltd.	Hong Kong	2021/7/5
621	Tower Research Capital (SINGAPORE) PTE. Ltd.	Singapore	2021/7/5
622	Nine Masts Capital Limited	Singapore	2021/7/19
623	KENSHO HOLDINGS, LLLP	Hong Kong	2021/7/21
624	La Banque Postale Asset Management	United States	2021/7/22
625	KGI INTERNATIONAL (HONG KONG) LIMITED	France	2021/7/26
626	Sygnia Asset Management (Proprietary) Limited	Hong Kong	2021/7/28
627	"China Galaxy International Asset Management (Hong Kong) Co., Limited"	South Africa	2021/7/28
628	GENERAL ORGANIZATION FOR SOCIAL INSURANCE	Hong Kong	2021/8/11
629	Kuwait Investment Office	Saudi Arabia	2021/8/19
630	True Light Capital Pte. Ltd.	Kuwait	2021/8/24
631	Timefolio Asset Management Singapore Pte Ltd	Singapore	2021/8/25
632	ExodusPoint Capital Management Singapore, Pte. Ltd.	Singapore	2021/9/17
633	Bain Capital (Singapore) Pte. Ltd.	Singapore	2021/9/2
634	Infini Capital Management Limited	Singapore	2021/9/2
635	LyGH Capital Pte Ltd	Hong Kong	2021/9/17
636	Teng Yue Partners, LP	Singapore	2021/9/2
637	Ocean Arete Limited	United States	2021/9/17
638	Central Wealth Asset Management Limited	Hong Kong	2021/9/3
639	Library Research Limited	Hong Kong	2021/9/2
640	LMR Partners Limited	Hong Kong	2021/9/17
641	Baker Bros. Advisors LP	Hong Kong	2021/9/2
642	TFI Asset Management Limited	United States	2021/9/3
643	Neuberger Berman Investment Advisers LLC	Hong Kong	2021/9/17
644	Farallon Capital Management, L.L.C.	United States	2021/9/17
645	O'NEIL GLOBAL ADVISORS, INC.	United States	2021/9/15
646	Vendavel Capital GP Limited	United States	2021/9/24
647	Fountainhead Partners Company Limited	Cayman Islands	2021/9/24
648	Guolian Securities International Asset Management Co., Limited	Hong Kong	2021/10/28
649	CSI Capital Management Limited	British Virgin Islands	2021/10/15
650	Silverbricks Asset Management Company Limited	Hong Kong	2021/10/28
651	Blackstone Alternative Asset Management L.P.	United States	2021/10/25
652	First Sentier Investors (Singapore)	Singapore	2021/10/26
653	Taaffeite Capital Management, LLC	United States	2021/11/1
654	Howbuy Hong Kong Limited	Hong Kong	2021/11/1
655	Hartford Capital Limited	Hong Kong	2021/11/1
656	First Shanghai Securities Limited	Hong Kong	2021/11/1
657	Public Investment Fund	Saudi Arabia	2021/11/5
658	Weiss Asset Management LP	United States	2021/11/11
659	HGNH International Asset Management (SG) Pte. Ltd.	Singapore	2021/11/9
660	CNCB (Hong Kong) Capital Limited	Hong Kong	2021/11/26
661	Oaktree Capital Management Pte. Ltd.	Singapore	2021/11/26
662	Navik Capital (Singapore) Pte. Ltd.	Singapore	2021/11/29
663	LUK FOOK ASSET MANAGEMENT (HK) LIMITED	Hong Kong	2021/12/14
664	Metori Capital Management	France	2021/12/14
665	CTBC Investments Co., Ltd.	Taiwan	2021/12/21
666	Security Kapitalanlage Aktiengesellschaft	Austria	2021/12/1
667	China Assets Investment Management Limited	Hong Kong	2021/12/6
668	RBC Global Asset Management (Asia) Limited	Hong Kong	2021/12/2
669	Schonfeld Strategic Advisors (Singapore) Pte. Ltd.	Singapore	2021/12/14
670	abrdn Hong Kong Limited	Hong Kong	2021/12/23

== See also ==
- Qualified Domestic Institutional Investor (QDII)
- State Administration of Foreign Exchange (SAFE)
- Economy of China
- Chinese financial system
- Banking in China
