= Sichuan Biokin Pharmaceutical =

Chinese Biopharmaceutical Company

Sichuan Biokin Pharmaceutical Co., Ltd.
- Native name: 四川百利天恒药业股份有限公司
- Company type: Public
- Traded as: SSE: 688506
- Industry: Biopharmaceutical
- Founded: August 23, 1996; 29 years ago
- Founder: Zhu Yi
- Headquarters: Chengdu, Sichuan, China
- Key people: Zhu Yi (Chairman & CEO)
- Revenue: ▲CN¥5.82 billion (2024)
- Net income: ▲CN¥3.71 billion (2024)
- Total assets: ▲CN¥7.14 billion (2024)
- Total equity: ▲CN¥3.89 billion (2024)
- Website: www.baili-pharm.com

Sichuan Biokin Pharmaceutical Co., Ltd. (Biokin; Chinese: 百利天恒; pinyin: Bǎilì tiānhéng) is a publicly listed Chinese biopharmaceutical company that is headquartered in Chengdu, Sichuan.

== History ==
Biokin started out in 1996 as a producer of complex generic drugs and traditional Chinese medicines.

In 2010 Biokin pivoted towards the innovative drug business, using its revenue from established products to fund research into specialized cancer therapies.

In early 2023, Biokin held its initial public offering and became a listed company on the Shanghai Stock Exchange STAR Market.

In December 2023 Biokin's wholly owned subsidiary SystImmune and Bristol Myers Squibb came to a deal that would pay SystImmune up to $8.4 billion for rights to co-develop and sell an experimental drug for lung and breast cancers. The agreement included an $800 million upfront payment to and as much as $500 million in contingent near-term payments.

In July 2024, Biokin filed for a secondary listing on the Hong Kong Stock Exchange. However, in November 2025, Biokin stated it would be delayed due to market conditions.

== See also ==
- Pfizer
- Roche
