= Guotai Haitong Securities =

Securities firm in the People's Republic of China

- Type: Public
- Traded as: SSE: 601211, SEHK: 2611
- Industry: Financial services
- Founded: 1992; 34 years ago
- Headquarters: Shanghai
- Key people: Zhu Jian (chairman)
- Revenue: ▲RMB 35.2 billion (2020)
- Operating income: ▲RMB 15.0 billion (2020)
- Net income: ▲RMB 11.1 billion (2020)
- Total assets: ▲RMB 702.9 billion (2020)
- Total equity: ▲RMB 146.2 billion (2020)
- Website: www.gtht.com

Guotai Haitong Securities (simplified Chinese: 国泰海通证券; traditional Chinese: 國泰海通證券; pinyin: Guótàiháitōng zhèngquàn), commonly abbreviated as GTHT, is a securities firm in China. Following its acquisition of Haitong Securities, it became China's largest securities brokerage by asset value.

== History ==
GTJA was established on August 18, 1999, after the merger of former Guotai Securities Co. Ltd. (founded on September 10, 1992) and Junan Securities Co. Ltd. (founded on August 25, 1992).

In 2003, GTJA was licensed to conduct QFII business. In 2007, it was granted QDII status. In 2008, it obtained the qualification for IB business.

In 2010, GTJA's subsidiary Guotai Junan International Holdings Ltd. was listed on the Hong Kong Stock Exchange. In March 2011, the subsidiary was included in the financial constituent stock of the Hong Kong Hang Seng Composite Index.

In 2025, Guotai Jun'an was rebrand as Guotai Haitong, after its acquisition of Haitong Securities started from September 2024.

== Subsidiaries ==
- Guotai Junan International Holdings Ltd.
- Guotai Junan Futures Co., Ltd.
- Shanghai Guotai Junan Securities Asset Management Co., Ltd.
- GTJA Innovation Investment Co., Ltd.
- Guotai Junan Allianz Fund Management Co., Ltd.

== See also ==
- Guotai Junan Futures
- Yim Fung
- Securities industry in China
