= Chengda =

Chengda may refer to:

- Chengdu University, a public university in Chengdu, Sichuan, China
- Fan Chengda (1126–1193), Song dynasty Chinese poet
- Liaoning Chengda, the state-owned company in Dalian, Liaoning, China
