= Huatai Securities =

Chinese Securities Brokerage

Huatai Securities Co., Ltd.
- Native name: 华泰证券股份有限公司
- Formerly: Jiangsu Securities
- Company type: Public
- Traded as: SSE: 601688 (A share); SEHK: 6886 (H share); LSE: HTSC (GDR)
- Industry: Financial services
- Founded: 9 April 1991; 35 years ago
- Headquarters: No. 228 Middle Jiangdong Road, Nanjing, Jiangsu, People's Republic of China
- Key people: Wei Zhang (Chairman); Yi Zhou (CEO)
- Services: Securities brokerage Investment banking Investment management
- Revenue: ▲CN¥51.92 billion (FY 2021)
- Net income: ▲CN¥12.98 billion (FY 2021)
- Total assets: ▲CN¥806.65 billion (FY 2021)
- Total equity: ▲CN¥152.04 billion (FY 2021)
- Number of employees: ▲14,372 (FY 2021)
- Subsidiaries: Huatai International; China Southern Asset Management
- Website: www.htsc.com.cn

Huatai Securities (HTSC) (Chinese: 华泰证券; pinyin: Huátài zhèngquàn) is a securities company in China which engages in the operation of large-scale comprehensive securities broking and trading services. The company was founded in 1991 and is headquartered in Nanjing, China.

== Background ==
Huatai Securities was established on 9 April 1991 in with a registered share capital of RMB 10 million. It was originally named Jiangsu Securities Company until it was renamed to Huatai Securities in 1999.

In 2008, Huatai Securities received approval from the China Securities Regulatory Commission to be a Qualified Domestic Institutional Investor.

On 26 February 2010, Huatai Securities was listed on the Shanghai Stock Exchange with the stock code of 601688.

On 1 June 2015, the H shares of Huatai Securities were listed on the Hong Kong Stock Exchange with the stock code of 6886.

In 2016, Huatai Securities acquired AssetMark, a wealth management technology provider from Aquiline Capital Partners and Genstar Capital for $780 million in cash.

In January 2018, the China Securities Regulatory Commission granted Huatai Securities permission to perform proprietary trading in overseas markets.

On 17 June 2019, global depository receipts of Huatai Securities were listed on London Stock Exchange with the stock code of HTSC.

In June 2020, Huatai Securities launched Zhangle Global, a US stock trading mobile app that targeted Chinese living overseas.

== See also ==
- Securities industry in China
