= Bosera Asset Management =

Chinese asset manager

Bosera Asset Management Co., Limited.

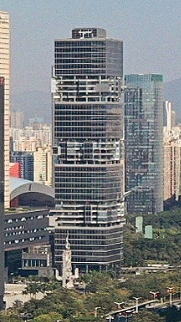
- Headquarters in Shenzhen
- Native name: 博时基金管理有限公司
- Type: Private
- Industry: Financial services
- Founded: 1998; 28 years ago
- Headquarters: Shenzhen, Guangdong, China
- AUM: RMB 1.8086 trillion (30 June 2026; including subsidiaries)
- Owners: China Merchants Securities (49%); China Great Wall Asset Management (25%)
- Number of employees: 832 (June 2026)

Chinese name
- Simplified Chinese: 博时基金管理有限公司
- Traditional Chinese: 博時基金管理有限公司
Transcriptions
Standard Mandarin
- Hanyu Pinyin: Bóshí Jījīn Guǎnlǐ Yǒuxiàn Gōngsī
- Website: www.bosera.com

Bosera Asset Management Co., Limited. (Chinese: 博时基金管理有限公司; pinyin: Bóshí jījīn guǎnlǐ yǒuxiàn gōngsī) is a Chinese asset manager. The company is headquartered in Shenzhen and has offices in Beijing, Zhengzhou, Shenyang, and Chengdu.

As of 2020, Bosera is the eighth largest asset manager and third largest Fund Management Company by AUM in Mainland China after China Asset Management and E Fund Management.

Bosera currently manages over US$200 billion.

== History ==
Bosera was one of the first five fund management firms to be incorporated in Mainland China, founded in 1998.

In July 2024, Reuters reported that Bosera capped the annual income of its staff to 2.9 million yuan and demanded clawback for anything more than that amount in the previous year, in line of the common prosperity agenda promoted by Chinese leader Xi Jinping.

== Corporate affairs ==
Bosera currently employs 598 employees.

Bosera's investment strategy is generally centered around fundamental analysis powered by their own internal research. The firm's clients include the National Social Security Fund of China.

Bosera Asset Management (International), a subsidiary of Bosera based in Hong Kong, is a RMB Qualified Foreign Institutional Investor and in 2014, partnered with KraneShares to list the first ETF in the United States incorporate to Chinese A-Shares, through Stock Connect.

In 2018 The Southern Bosera Fund Tower, a 42 floor Skyscraper designed by Austrian architect Hans Hollein, was completed and serves as their headquarters in Shenzhen, China.

In July 2024, it was announced that Bosera debuted an exchange traded fund that tracks an index of major listed Chinese companies owned by the central government, the first of its kind on the Hong Kong Stock Exchange.
