= RMB Qualified Foreign Institutional Investor =

Established in 2011, the Renminbi Qualified Foreign Institutional Investor (RQFII) program is a policy initiative that allows foreign investors who hold the RQFII quota to invest directly in mainland China's bond and equity markets. The program represents a continued loosening of China's capital controls and departure from its predecessor QFII. The RQFII program relaxes existing restrictions on currency settlement, adds permissible asset classes, and expands investor eligibility. The current RQFII relevant jurisdiction applies to financial organizations registered in Hong Kong, Singapore, the United Kingdom, France, Korea, Germany, Australia, Switzerland, Canada, the United States and Luxembourg.

== History ==
As the second largest economy in the world, China represents a key driver of global growth. Although the Renminbi has been elevated to reserve currency status, only 10.3% of global trade is done through the currency (as of 2015). Because of this imbalance, the Chinese government has undertaken measures in recent years to open the country's capital account.

The Qualified Foreign Institutional Investor (QFII) program was launched in 2002. Primary aims were letting financial institutions outside China invest in China's stock and bond markets. However, it was limited to certain financial institutions such as commercial banks, securities companies, insurance companies, and securities with no less than US$500 million.

Acknowledging that further action was necessary, RQFII was jointly established in December 2011 by the China Securities Regulatory Commission, the People's Bank of China, and the State Administration of Foreign Exchange. It allows subsidiaries of domestic fund management companies and securities companies in Hong Kong to invest in the mainland securities market. Initially, RMB 20 billion of quota was divided among 21 selected financial services firms in Hong Kong. The available quota was increased steadily throughout 2012 during the rollout of Phases II and III of the plan, rising from RMB 50 billion to RMB 70 billion in quota and topping out to 270 RMB billion by the year's end. Launching Phase IV of the program in 2013 allowed for inclusion of firms based in Singapore and London. 2014 saw inclusion of firms based in Paris and Taiwan.

== Available Instruments ==
The RQFII scheme applies to the following instruments:

- Exchange-listed or transferred A-share (not including the New Third Board)
- Bonds, warrants, and inter-bank market fixed income products (not including repo, ABS, etc.)
- Mutual funds and aggregate asset management plans issued by mutual fund managers or brokerage houses (not including subsidiaries of these institutions or priority-inferior funds, etc.)
- Stock index futures
- Stock IPOs, issuance of convertible bonds, placements and additional offerings, etc.
- Other instruments approved by CSRC

== Eligible Applicants ==
The RQFII program is open to two categories of investors:

1. Applicants in the Relevant Jurisdictions that are subsidiaries of Chinese fund management companies, Chinese securities companies, Chinese commercial banks, and Chinese insurance companies
2. Financial institutions that are registered in a Relevant Jurisdiction and with a principal place of business in a Relevant Jurisdiction

The RQFII eligible jurisdictions are currently Hong Kong, Singapore, the United Kingdom, France, Korea, Germany, Australia, Switzerland, Canada, the United States, and Luxembourg.

== RQFII vs QFII ==
	RQFII	QFII
Regulator	CSRC, SAFE	CSRC, SAFE
Criteria of Applicants	Commercial Banks: In operation for more than 10 years; Securities AUM no less than US$5 billion; Tier 1 Capital no less than US$300 million; Securities Companies: In operation for more than 5 years; Securities AUM no less than US$5 billion; Capital no less than US$500 million; AMC, insurance companies and other institutions: Business experience of more than 2 years; Securities AUM no less than US$500 million	A financial institution that: Has a healthy financial condition, a good credit standing, and its domicile and business qualification meet the requirements of the CSRC: Has effective corporate governance and internal controls, and has practitioners; who meet the relevant professional qualification requirements of the residential country or region: Operates its business in a compliant manner and has not been subject to serious; penalties that are meted out by any regulators of its domicile in the last three years or since its inception; and: Other requirements stipulated by the CSRC in accordance with the principle of; prudential regulation
Lock-up Period for Open-ended Fund	None	3 months
Fund Repatriation	100% principal after lock-up period	20% of principal net worth at the end of past year every month

== Top 20 RQFII Quota Holders ==
Name of Institution	Place of domicile	Qualification approval date	Approved Quota (in USD, million)
CSOP Asset Management Ltd	Hong Kong	9/22/2014	$6,891
Vanguard Investment Australia Ltd	Australia	1/27/2016	$4,484
E Fund Management (HK) Co., Limited	Hong Kong	5/30/2014	$4,066
China Asset Management (Hong Kong) Limited	Hong Kong	7/26/2013	$3,259
BlackRock (Singapore) Limited	Singapore	5/30/2016	$2,990
Harvest Global Investment Limited	Hong Kong	9/22/2014	$2,203
Haitong International Holdings Limited	Hong Kong	8/26/2014	$1,599
Bosera Asset Management (International) Co., Ltd	Hong Kong	8/26/2014	$1,435
Shinhan BNP Paribas Asset Management Co., Ltd	Korea	4/28/2015	$1,196
Taikang Asset Management(Hong Kong) Company Limited	Hong Kong	8/26/2014	$1,106
Guoyuan Securities (Hong Kong)	Hong Kong	8/26/2014	$1,091
Guotai Junan Financial Holdings	Hong Kong	5/30/2014	$1,031
China Life Franklin Asset Management Co., Ltd	Hong Kong	8/26/2014	$972
Carmignac Gestion	France	6/29/2015	$897
Lyxor Asset Management	France	5/29/2015	$897
Deutsche Asset & Wealth Management	Germany	3/26/2015	$897
ABCI Asset Management Limited	Hong Kong	7/30/2014	$792
GIC Private Limited	Singapore	4/28/2015	$747
Swiss Reinsurance Company Ltd	Switzerland	7/29/2015	$747
Generali Investments Luxembourg S.A.	Luxembourg	4/28/2016	$747
