= Guangfa Securities Headquarters =

Skyscraper in Guangzhou, Guangdong, China

Coordinates: 23.1240°N 113.3262°E

- 广发证券总部
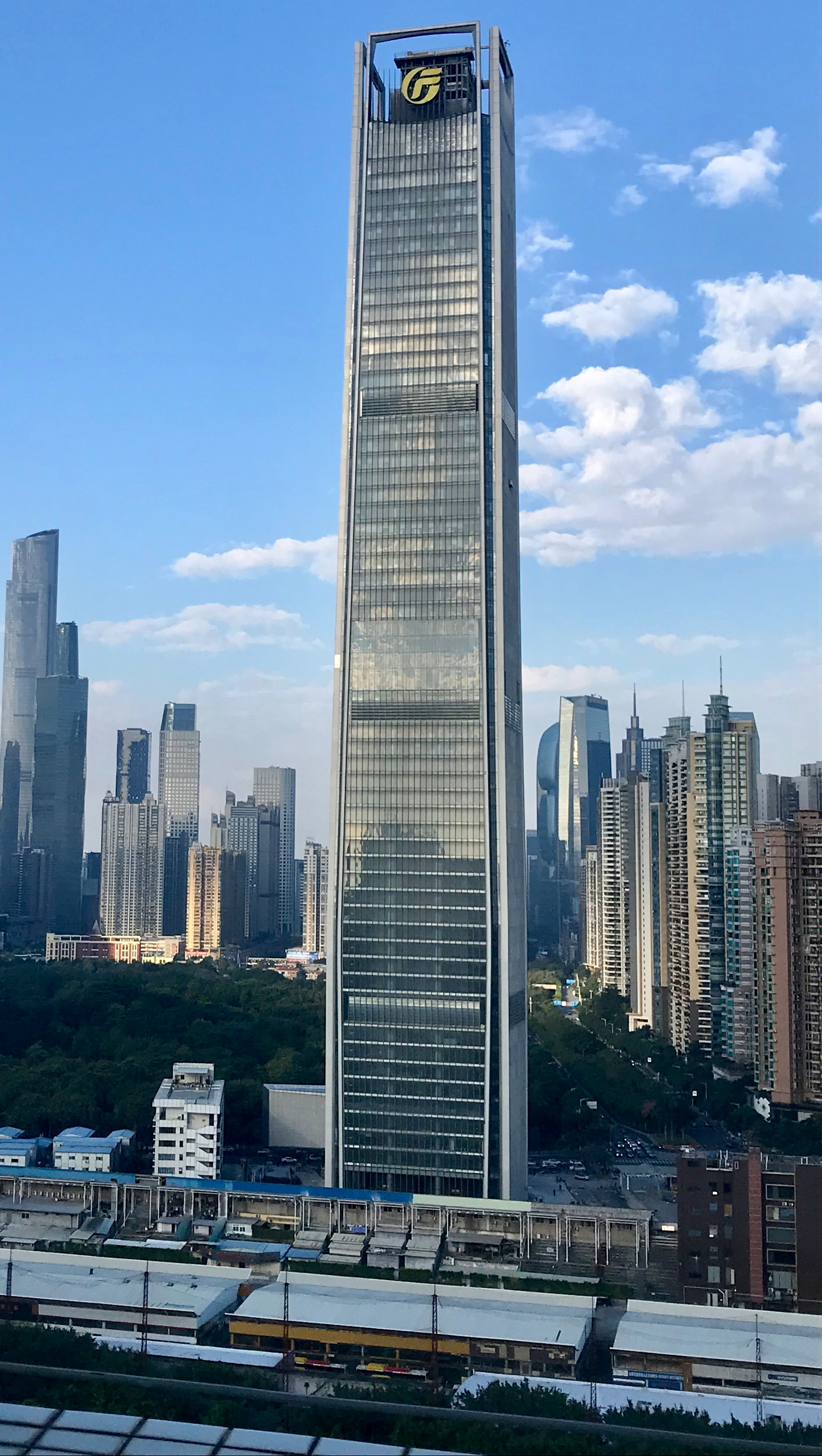
- Guangfa Securities Headquarters in November 2018
- Interactive map of the Guangfa Securities Headquarters area
- Alternative names: GF Securities Tower

General information
- Status: Complete
- Location: Guangzhou, Guangdong, 26 Machang Road, China
- Construction started: 2013
- Completed: 2018
- Owner: GF Securities

Height
- Architectural: 308 m (1,010 ft)
- Tip: 308 m (1,010 ft)
- Roof: 308 m (1,010 ft)
- Top floor: 273 m (896 ft)

Technical details
- Floor count: 58 (+5 underground)

Design and construction
- Architecture firm: Jaeger Kahlen Partner

Guangfa Securities Headquarters (Chinese: 广发证券总部; pinyin: Guǎngfà zhèngjuàn zǒngbù), also known as GF Securities Tower, is a 58-floor, 308 m (1,010 ft) tall skyscraper in Guangzhou, Guangdong, China. Construction was started in 2013 and was completed in 2018.

It serves as the headquarters of GF Securities.

== See also ==
- List of tallest buildings in China
- List of tallest buildings in Guangzhou
