= China Universal Asset Management =

Chinese company

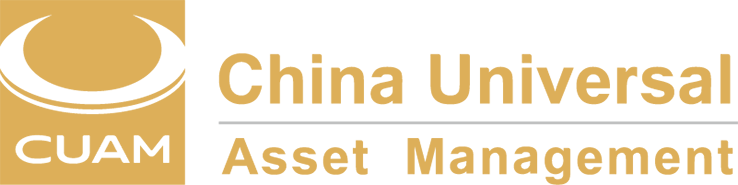
- Type: Private
- Industry: Investment Management
- Founded: February 2005
- Headquarters: Shanghai, China
- Key people: 李文 Wen Li (Chairman) 张晖 Herbert Zhang (CEO)
- Products: Mutual funds, Cross-Border Funds (QDII, QFII), Pension Management, Segregated Accounts, Advisory Services, E-Commerce
- AUM: US$ 178 billion (Q2 2022)
- Owners: Orient Securities (35.412%); China Eastern Airlines (19.966%)
- Website: www.chinauniversalasset.com

China Universal Asset Management Co., Ltd. (汇添富基金管理股份有限公司), also known as China Universal or CUAM, is a Chinese investment management company specializing in China-related investment management solutions founded in February 2005. It is headquartered in Shanghai, China, with branch offices in Beijing, Guangzhou, and Chengdu. In 2010 and 2013, China Universal established subsidiaries China Universal Asset Management (Hong Kong) Company Limited and China Universal Capital respectively. The firm's major shareholders are Orient Securities Co., Ltd., Wenhui-Xinmin United Press Group, and China Eastern Airlines.

Products and services of the firm include mutual funds, outbound cross-border funds (QDII), the National Social Securities Fund, e-commerce, advisory services (QFII and domestic), and segregated account services for retail, institutional, and high net-worth clients. The firm's subsidiaries offer inbound cross-border funds (RQFII), Hong-Kong domiciled funds, advisory services (RQFII and QFII), segregated account services, and private equity investments.

== See also ==
- Economy of China
