= Ronbay Technology =

Chinese company

- Native name: 容百科技
- Industry: Lithium-ion batteries
- Founded: September 18, 2014; 11 years ago in Zunyi, China
- Founder: Bai Houshan; Liu Xianglie
- Revenue: CNY 2.1 billion (2023)
- Number of employees: 4380 (2024)

Ningbo Ronbay New Energy Technology Co Ltd, usually known as Ronbay Technology, is a Chinese company and one of the world's biggest manufacturers of cathode active material for lithium-ion batteries.

Ronbay was founded on September 18, 2014 in Zunyi by Bai Houshan and Liu Xianglie. The company listed on the Shanghai Stock Exchange STAR Market on July 22, 2019, the market's first day of operation. As of 2023, the company had a 30% market share in lithium nickel manganese cobalt oxides (NMC) with high nickel contents, which are widely used in electric vehicles.

Ronbay's main production sites are in Ezhou, Xiantao and Zunyi in China, as well as in Chungju, South Korea. In 2022, the company began building further production sites in South Korea to circumvent U.S. trade restrictions put in place by the Inflation Reduction Act. It also announced plans to expand into Indonesia and Poland.

In 2024, LG Chem sued Ronbay's South Korean subsidiary, Jaesae Neungwon, alleging it had infringed on five of LG Chem's patents for NMC materials.
