= Pinpoint Asset Management =

Hong Kong investment firm

Pinpoint Asset Management Limited
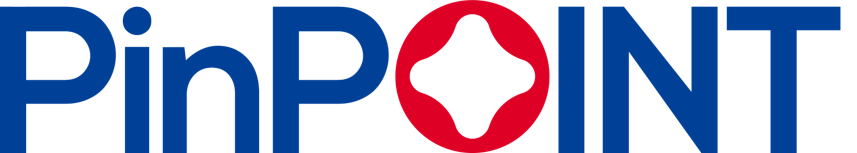
- Native name: 保銀資產管理有限公司
- Type: Private
- Industry: Investment management
- Founded: 1999 (27 years ago)
- Founders: Wang Qiang; Sunny Li
- Headquarters: International Finance Centre, Central, Hong Kong
- Key people: Wang Qiang (Chairman); Zhang Zhiwei (President)
- AUM: US$3.7 billion (2020)
- Website: pinpointfund.com

Pinpoint Asset Management (Pinpoint; Chinese: 保銀資產管理; pinyin: Bǎoyín Zīchǎn Guǎnlǐ), is a Chinese hedge fund management firm headquartered in Hong Kong with its other main office based in Shanghai. It is one of the earliest hedge funds established in Mainland China.

== Background ==
Pinpoint was founded in 1999 by Wang Qiang and Sunny Li. It originally grew out of a Shanghai-based wealth management business that ran managed accounts for friends and family that invested in the China equities market.

As the accounts grew, Pinpoint received increased investor demand for a China long/short equity fund. In 2005, it launched its first fund, the Pinpoint China Fund. At the time there were only 10 mainland Chinese-owned hedge funds. The funding came from the offshore assets of high-net-worth individual with 60% living in China and the rest living in the United States, New Zealand, Hong Kong and Australia.

Initially A-shares could not be legally shorted so the firm shorted securities in Hong Kong and used other overseas assets. As a result, Pinpoint pursued more long opportunities than short positions. 60% of assets were in A-shares with the remaining being in Hong Kong equities or American depositary receipts. Because of foreign exchange controls, Pinpoint had to invest through the Qualified Foreign Institutional Investor quota system which was 10 times more expensive compared to local brokerages. The fund posted a 47% net return in the first four months. It made returns of 17.43%, 129.18% and 100% in the years 2005, 2006 and 2007 respectively.

When Pinpoint analysts analyse an individual companies, the three top considerations are certainty, safety and growth. Networking played a crucial role in the firm's success as it was needed for analysts to be able to perform proper due diligence on companies. As more financial instruments were approved, Pinpoint launched new funds with different strategies. Pinpoint also engaged in private equity investing.

While Pinpoint has reported significant gains compared to its peers such as its China fund returning 23% in 2017, and its multi-strategy fund returning 9.8% in 2020, it has also reported losses such as in 2022 where its China fund reported a loss of 13%.

In 2022, Pinpoint opened an office in Singapore as part of its expansion. It also has offices in India and Japan.

In November 2023, it was reported Pinpoint was following larger hedge fund peers like Citadel LLC and Millennium Management, LLC by charging clients additional fees to cover employee costs. It created three new share classes using this structure.

Pinpoint reported a loss over 6% for the year 2023. However, as of April 2024, it has produced a return of 6% since start of the year.
