= Haitong International =

Hong Kong Securities firm

Haitong International Securities Group Limited
- Formerly: Tai Fook Securities
- Industry: Financial services
- Founded: 1973
- Headquarters: Hong Kong
- Key people: Zhuang Wei (Deputy Chairman & CEO)
- Services: Corporate Finance; Brokerage; Asset Management; Currency and Commodities; Institutional Equities
- Parent: Haitong Securities
- Subsidiaries: Haitong Securities India

Chinese name
- Traditional Chinese: 海通國際證券集團有限公司
- Simplified Chinese: 海通国际证券集团有限公司
- Literal meaning: "Sea connect" international securities group limited company
Transcriptions

short name
- Traditional Chinese: 海通國際
- Simplified Chinese: 海通国际
- Literal meaning: "Sea connect" international
Transcriptions
- Website: www.htisec.com

Haitong International Securities Group Limited known as Haitong International is an international financial institution with established presence in Hong Kong and a rapidly expanding network across the globe. It strives to serve as a bridge linking up the Chinese and overseas capital markets. The parent company of Haitong International is Guotai Haitong Securities Co., Ltd (“Guotai Haitong Securities”).

It was known as Tai Fook Securities which was owned by Chow Tai Fook–New World Development group until 2009.

== History ==
=== Tai Fook Securities era ===
When the firm was known as Tai Fook Securities, it was accused that the firm lowered its commission below Stock Exchange of Hong Kong's minimum, by gifts from sister companies Chow Tai Fook Jewellery and New World Telephone in 1999.

=== Haitong International Securities Group era ===
Tai Fook Securities was then takeover by the Chinese firm Haitong Securities in 2009. Haitong Securities paid HK$1.82 billion to acquire the controlling stake of Tai Fook Securities from NWS Holdings. After the takeover, Tai Fook Securities was renamed to Haitong International Securities Group.

Haitong International is the first Chinese financial institution in Hong Kong to have been assigned a “BBB” long-term credit rating by Standard and Poor's. In November 2016 Haitong International Securities acquired Haitong Securities India from Haitong Bank, a sister company that formerly known as Banco Espírito Santo de Investimento.
