= Yim Fung =

- Born: Yim Fung; 1963 (age 62–63)
- Disappeared: November 18, 2015; China
- Status: Returned December 2015
- Other names: Yan Feng
- Employer: Guotai Junan Securities

Yim Fung was the joint chairman and chief executive of Guotai Junan International Holdings Limited, a subsidiary of Guotai Junan Securities, one of the largest securities brokers in China.

== Disappearance ==
On November 18, 2015, it was reported that Fung had disappeared. Guotai Junan International's shares had fallen as much as 17% when it first announced about Yim's disappearance and it had appointed a temporary replacement.

== Return ==
Guotai Junan International issued a statement saying Yim had returned after assisting in certain investigations and "neither Yim nor the company were the subject of the investigation". Yim had resumed his duties thereafter. The mysterious nature of Yim's disappearance coincided with a period when the government was focusing on the financial sector in its anti-corruption crackdown.

== See also ==
- List of solved missing person cases (post-2000)
