= Lithium nickel manganese cobalt oxides =

Lithium-ion battery cathode material

Lithium nickel manganese cobalt oxides (abbreviated as Li-NMC, LNMC, NMC, or NCM) are mixed metal oxides of lithium, nickel, manganese and cobalt with the general formula LiNi_{x}Mn_{y}Co_{1-x-y}O_{2}. These materials are commonly used in lithium-ion batteries for mobile devices and electric vehicles, acting as the positively charged electrode, commonly called the cathode (though when charging it is actually the anode). When a battery is charged up, the lithium in the positive electrode is depleted, so it is lithium deficient (that is, the composition becomes Li_{1-n}Ni_{x}Mn_{y}Co_{1-x-y}O_{2} where n is the amount of Li removed from the material).

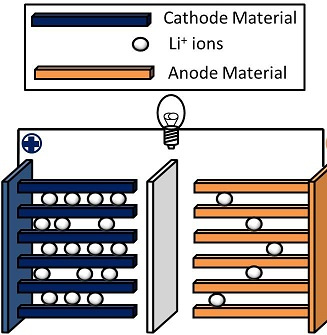
A general schematic of a lithium-ion battery. Lithium ions intercalate into the cathode or anode during charging and discharging.

There is a particular interest in optimizing NMC for electric vehicle applications because of the material's high energy density and operating voltage. Reducing the cobalt content in NMC is also a current target, due to the metal's high cost. Furthermore, an increased nickel content provides more capacity within the stable operation window.

== Structure ==
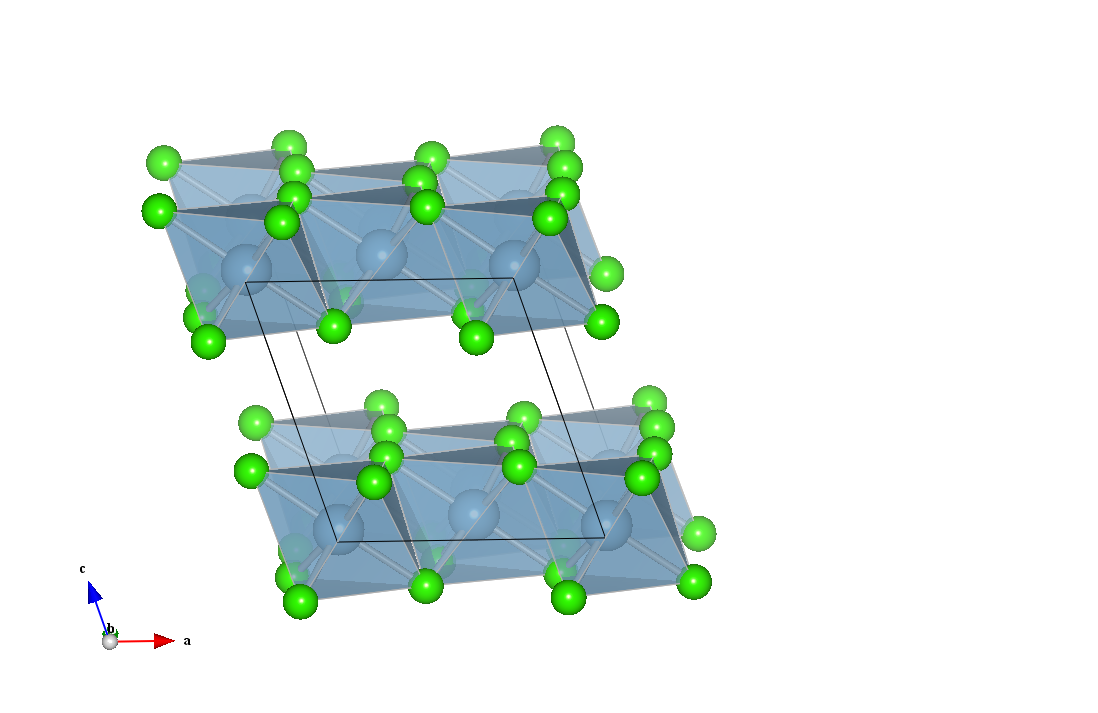
Example of a layered structure. Lithium ions can move in and out between the layers.

NMC materials have layered structures similar to the individual metal oxide compound lithium cobalt oxide (LiCoO_{2}). Lithium ions intercalate between the layers upon discharging, remaining between the layered slabs of transition metals. Upon charging, the lithium de-intercalates from the cathode and moves to the anode.

Points in a solid solution phase diagram between the end members LiCoO_{2}, LiMnO_{2}, and LiNiO_{2} represent stoichiometric NMC cathodes. Three numbers immediately following the "NMC" (or "NCM") abbreviation indicate the relative stoichiometry of the three defining metals. For example, an NMC molar composition of 33% nickel, 33% manganese, and 33% cobalt (in molar percentages) would be abbreviated as NMC111 (also NMC333 or NCM333) and have a chemical formula of LiNi _{0.33}Mn_{0.33}Co_{0.33}O_{2}. A composition of 50% nickel, 30% manganese, and 20% cobalt would be called NMC532 (or NCM523) and have the formula LiNi_{0.5}Mn_{0.3}Co_{0.2}O_{2}. Other newer common compositions are NMC622 and NMC811. The general lithium content typically remains around 1:1 with the total transition metal content, with commercial NMC samples usually containing less than 5% excess lithium.

For NMC111, the ideal oxidation states for charge distribution are Mn^{4+}, Co^{3+}, and Ni^{2+}. Cobalt and nickel oxidize partially to Co^{4+} and Ni^{4+} during charging, while Mn^{4+} remains inactive and maintains structural stability. Modifying the transition metal stoichiometry changes the material's properties, providing a way to adjust cathode performance. Most notably, increasing the nickel content in NMC increases its initial discharge capacity, but lowers its thermal stability and capacity retention. Increasing cobalt content comes at the cost of replacing either higher-energy nickel or chemically stable manganese while also being expensive. Oxygen can generate from the metal oxide at 300 °C when fully discharged, degrading the lattice. Higher nickel content decreases the oxygen generation temperature while also increasing the heat generation during battery operation. Cation mixing, a process in which Li^{+} substitutes Ni^{2+} ions in the lattice, also increases as nickel concentration increases, which is facilitated by the similar ionic radii of Ni^{2+} (0.69 Å) and Li^{+} (0.76 Å). Displacing nickel from the layered structure can alter the material's bonding characteristics, forming undesirable phases and lowering its capacity.

== Synthesis ==
The crystallinity, particle size distribution, morphology, and composition all affect the performance of NMC materials, and these parameters can be tuned by using different synthesis methods. The first report of nickel manganese cobalt oxide used a coprecipitation method, which is still commonly used today. This method involves co-addition of transition metal salt solutions together a chelating agent (such as ammonium hydroxide), which results in the co-precipitation of mixed transition metal hydroxide or carbonate particles. These particles are filtered, and washed to remove excess solvent. The transition metal hydroxide is then blended with a lithium source (commonly lithium hydroxide or lithium carbonate), and heated to temperatures up to 900 °C under oxygen in a process called calcination to yield the final NMC cathode material, which can be washed to remove excess lithium salts.

Other important commercial methods for NMC materials synthesis include spray pyrolysis and solid-state synthesis.

Sol–gel methods are another common NMC synthesis method. In this method, transition metal precursors are dissolved in a nitrate or acetate solution, then combined with a lithium nitrate or lithium acetate and citric acid solution. This mixture is stirred and heated to about 80 °C under basic conditions until a viscous gel forms. The gel is dried at around 120 °C and calcined twice, once at 450 °C and again at 800–900 °C, to obtain NMC material.

Hydrothermal treatment can be paired with either the coprecipitation or sol–gel routes. It involves heating the coprecipitate or gel precursors in an autoclave. The treated precursors are then filtered off and calcined normally. Hydrothermal treatments before calcination improves the crystallinity of NMC, which increases the material's performance in cells. However, this comes at the cost of longer material processing times.

== History ==
NMC cathode materials are historically related to John B. Goodenough's 1980s work on lithium cobalt oxide (LiCoO_{2}) and early studies on LiNiO_{2}. The first reports of NMC materials include those by Zhaolin Liu et al. from the Institute of Materials Research and Engineering in Singapore in 1999, and Yoshio et al. in 2000. As of 2023, the biggest producers of NMC materials include EcoPro, Ronbay Technology, Easpring and Umicore.

=== Lithium-rich NMCs ===
Lithium-rich NMCs are simply those with a lithium to transition-metal ratio higher than 1:1. Their structure can be represented as a solid solution between a stoichiometric LiMO_{2}-type oxide and a closely related lithium-rich Li_{2}MnO_{3} oxide. Early reports of Li-rich NCM cathode material(s) appeared ca. 2000–2001 independently by four research teams:

1. At Argonne National Laboratory in the USA a group led by Michael M. Thackeray reported these lithium-rich cathodes with the intergrowth structure.
2. At Pacific Lithium in New Zealand a team led by Brett Amundsen reported a series of Li(Li_{x}Cr_{y}Mn_{z})O_{2} layered electrochemically active compounds.
3. At Dalhousie University in Canada a team led by Jeff Dahn reported a series of layered cathode materials based on a solid solution formulation of Li(Li_{x}M_{y}Mn_{z})O_{2}, where metal M is not chromium.
4. A group at Osaka City University led by Tsutomu Ohzuku, who also developed lithium nickel cobalt aluminium oxides.

== Properties ==
The cell voltage of lithium-ion batteries with NMC cathodes is 3.6–3.7 V.

Arumugam Manthiram has reported that the relative positioning of the metals' 3d bands to the oxygen 2p band leads to each metal's role within NMC cathode materials. The manganese 3d band is above the oxygen 2p band, resulting in manganese's high chemical stability. The cobalt and nickel 3d bands overlap the oxygen 2p band, allowing them to charge to their 4+ oxidation states without the oxygen ions losing electron density.

== Usage ==
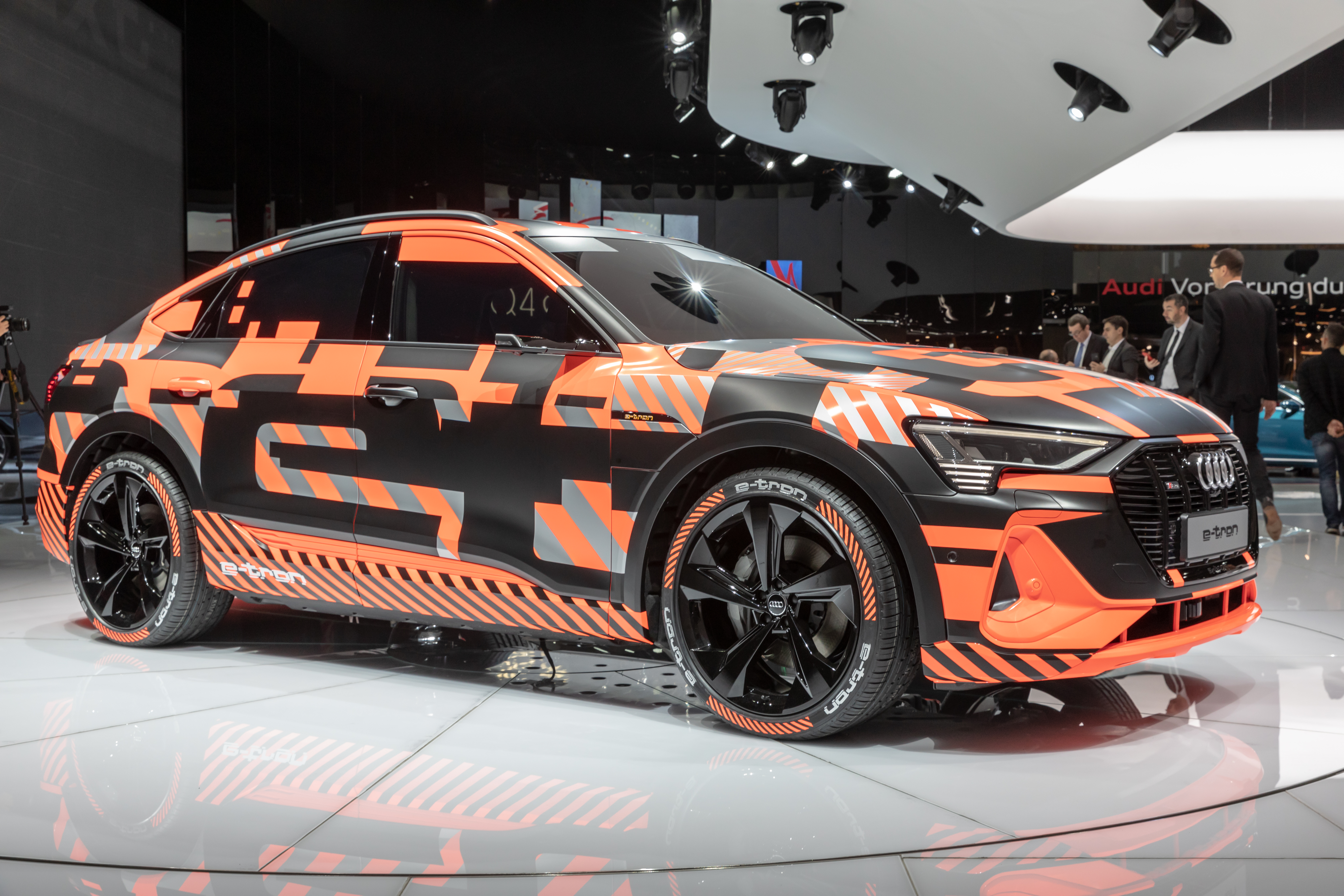
Audi e-tron Sportback, a car that uses NMC-based batteries as a power source

Many electric cars use NMC cathode batteries. NMC batteries were installed in the BMW ActiveE in 2011, and in the BMW i8 starting from 2013. Other electric cars with NMC batteries include, as of 2020: Audi e-tron GE, BAIC EU5 R550, BMW i3, BMW i4, BYD Yuan EV535, Chevrolet Bolt, Hyundai Kona Electric, Jaguar I-Pace, Jiangling Motors JMC E200L, NIO ES6, Nissan Leaf S Plus, Renault ZOE, Roewe Ei5, VW e-Golf and VW ID.3. By 2023, China does not allow NMC for vehicles transporting people. Only a few electric car manufacturers do not use NMC cathodes in their traction batteries. Tesla is a significant exception, as they use nickel cobalt aluminium oxide and lithium iron phosphate batteries for their vehicles. In 2015, Elon Musk reported that the home storage Tesla Powerwall is based on NMC in order to increase the number of charge/discharge cycles over the life of the units.

in the Merseyside area, some (7 out of 53) battery electric multiple units British Rail Class 777 trains use these batteries.

Mobile electronics such as mobile phones/smartphones, laptops, and pedelecs can also use NMC-based batteries. These applications almost exclusively used lithium cobalt oxide batteries previously. Another application of NMC batteries is battery storage power stations. Two such storage systems were installed in Korea in 2016 with a combined capacity of 15 MWh. In 2017, a 35 MW NMC battery with a capacity of 11 MWh was installed and commissioned in Newman in the Australian state of Western Australia.

== See also ==
- Lithium-ion battery
- Lithium cobalt oxide
- Lithium iron phosphate
