= China Asset Management =

Chinese Asset Management Company

China Asset Management Co., Ltd.
- Native name: 华夏基金管理有限公司
- Industry: Investment Management
- Founded: 1998; 28 years ago
- Headquarters: Beijing, China
- Key people: Yang Minghui (chairman)
- AUM: US$271 billion (2021)
- Owners: CITIC Securities (62.2%); Power Corporation of Canada (13.9%); Mackenzie Investments (13.9%)
- Website: www.chinaamc.com

China Asset Management Co., Ltd. (ChinaAMC; Chinese: 华夏基金管理有限公司; pinyin: Huáxià jījīn guǎnlǐ yǒuxiàn gōngsī) is one of China's biggest fund families. The company offers investment managers of National Social Security Fund, corporate annuities, Listed Open-end Fund (LOF), Qualified Domestic Institutional Investor (QDII) funds and Qualified Foreign Institutional Investor (QFII) funds, etc. It is the first exchange-traded fund (ETF) manager in China, and the sole investment manager of Asian Bond Fund China Fund. The company is the first in the industry to initiate the investment philosophy of Research Creates Value.

== Background ==
ChinaAMC was established in 1998 and is headquartered in Beijing, China, with branches in Shanghai, Nanjing, Shenzhen, Chengdu, and Hangzhou, and three subsidiaries-China Asset Management (Hong Kong), China Capital Management, and China Wealth Management. Li Yimei is the CEO of the company.

Power Corporation acquired a stake in China Asset Management in 2011, which is followed by another stake purchase by Mackenzie Investments in 2017. Mackenzie is owned by Toronto-listed asset and wealth manager IGM Financial, which is owned by Power Corporation. Together they own 27.8% stake in ChinaAMC. CITIC Securities is the largest shareholder with 62.2% stake.

In 2017, ChinaAMC became the first full-service Chinese asset manager to sign up for the United Nations-supported Principles for Responsible Investment (PRI).

As of June 30, 2023, ChinaAMC is one of the largest fund management companies in China with $261 billion (RMB 1.869 trillion) in Assets Under Management (including that of subsidiaries), and a client base comprising nearly 220,000 institutional clients and over 210 million retail investors.

In June 2024, Reuters wrote that Qatar's sovereign fund Qatar Investment Authority had agreed to buy a 10% stake in ChinaAMC and was awaiting approval by Chinese regulators.
