= Haitong Securities =

Chinese Securities company

Haitong Securities Company Limited 海通證券股份有限公司
- Type: Public
- Traded as: SSE: 600837; SEHK: 6837
- Industry: Securities
- Founded: 1988; 38 years ago
- Defunct: 2025
- Fate: Merged into Guotai Jun'an Securities
- Headquarters: Shanghai, People's Republic of China
- Area served: People's Republic of China
- Owner: Mr. Wang Kaiguo
- Subsidiaries: Haitong International
- Website: Haitong Securities Company Limited

Haitong Securities was a securities firm in China, providing services in stocks and futures brokerage, as well as investment banking, corporate finance, M&A, asset management, mutual fund, and private equity.

Haitong was listed on the Shanghai Stock Exchange in July 2007 and has a market capitalization of more than $17.9 billion. By mid-2020, it was among China's four largest securities firms, together with CITIC Securities, Guotai Junan Securities, and GF Securities.

== History ==
Haitong was founded in 1988 in mainland China. In April 2012, it IPO'd after two tries (December 2011 was cancelled due to market conditions), in Hong Kong. It began trading in the Hong Kong Stock Exchange on April 27, 2012.

In 2015, Haitong Securities completed the purchase of BESI, the investment banking operations of Portuguese bank Novo Banco.

In 2019, Haitong Securities Co., Ltd. appoints Mao Yuxing as Deputy General Manager.

On July 24, 2021, the China Securities Regulatory Commission released the "2021 Securities Company Classification Results", in which Haitong Securities was rated BBB, a significant decrease from the AA level in 2020.

In September 2024, Guotai Jun'an Securities announced it will merge with Haitong. On 4 March 2025, Haitong A and H shares were delisted from Shanghai and Hong Kong Stock Exchanges. The merger was completed in April 2025.

== See also ==
- Securities industry in China
