= Jilin Aodong Medicine =

Chinese pharmaceutical company

Jilin Aodong Medicine Industry Group Company Limited 吉林敖東藥業集團股份有限公司
- Company type: State-owned enterprise
- Industry: Pharmaceutical
- Founded: 1993
- Headquarters: Dunhua, Jilin, People's Republic of China
- Area served: People's Republic of China
- Key people: Chairman: Mr. Li Xiulin
- Website: www.jlaod.com/

Jilin Aodong Medicine Industry Group Company Limited (SZSE: 000623; Chinese: 吉林敖東藥業集團股份有限公司) is a state-owned enterprise in Dunhua, Jilin, China. It involves in the manufacture and sale of Chinese patent drugs and pharmaceutical packaging products, and the collection of traffic tolls and the road engineering construction business. It was established in 1993 and listed on the Shenzhen Stock Exchange in 1996.
