= Fullgoal Fund Management =

Chinese asset manager

Fullgoal Fund Management Co., Ltd.
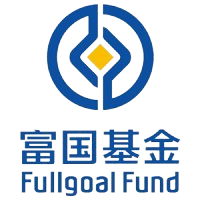
- Native name: 富国基金管理有限公司
- Company type: Private
- Industry: Financial services
- Founded: April 13, 1999; 27 years ago
- Headquarters: Shanghai, China
- Key people: Chen Ge (CEO); Li Xiaowei (CIO)
- AUM: US$123.7 billion (December 2022)
- Owners: Haitong Securities (27.775%); Bank of Montreal (27.775%); Shenwan Hongyuan (27.775%); Shandong Financial Asset Management (16.675%)
- Subsidiaries: Fullgoal Asset Management (HK) Limited
- Website: www.fullgoal.com.cn

Fullgoal Fund Management (Fullgoal; Chinese: 富国基金管理; pinyin: Fùguó jījīn guǎnlǐ) is a Chinese asset management company founded in 1999. It is headquartered in Shanghai, China.

== History ==
Fullgoal was established in 1999 as one of the earliest asset management companies in China.

In February 2001, Fullgoal and the Bank of Montreal (BMO) signed a cooperation agreement to work together to develop the asset management business in China. In May 2003, it was announced that BMO received approval from the China Securities Regulatory Commission to acquire a minority interest in Fullgoal. At the time, BMO was the first foreign company to acquire an interest in an established fund management company in China. However, as of 2018, no BMO asset management products have been distributed in China.

In Fullgoal's 2012 corporate statement, it stated it wanted to create a bridge between mainland China and international capital markets. In that year, Fullgoal established a subsidiary in Hong Kong named Fullgoal Asset Management (HK) Limited which would focus on Chinese securities listed outside China. However it did not offer any retail fund products until July 2019 where it received approval from the Securities and Futures Commission to offer them to retail investors.

Fullgoal is one of the earliest companies in China to use quantitative analysis as part of its investment process. In December 2009, it launched the first enhanced index fund in China and as of May 2019, has beaten the Chinese stock market by 56% since inception. By using a data-driven approach with computers, it became the largest quantitative manager in China. Clients that Fullgoal manage money for include the Abu Dhabi Investment Authority.
