= Liaoning Chengda =

Liaoning Chengda Company Limited 辽宁成大股份有限公司
- Company type: State-owned enterprise
- Industry: Conglomerate
- Founded: 1993; 33 years ago
- Headquarters: Dalian, Liaoning, People's Republic of China
- Area served: People's Republic of China
- Key people: Chairman: Mr. Shang Shuzhi
- Website: Liaoning Chengda Company Limited

Liaoning Chengda Company Limited (SSE: 600739) is a state-owned conglomerate enterprise in Dalian, Liaoning, China. It is engaged in exports and imports, trading, chemical fertilizers, pharmaceuticals, property leasing, biological vaccine and warehousing.

It was established in 1993, starting as Liaoning Knitwear and Home-Textiles Import & Export Company. Its A shares were listed on the Shanghai Stock Exchange in 1996.
