= China Guangfa Bank =

Chinese commercial banking corporation

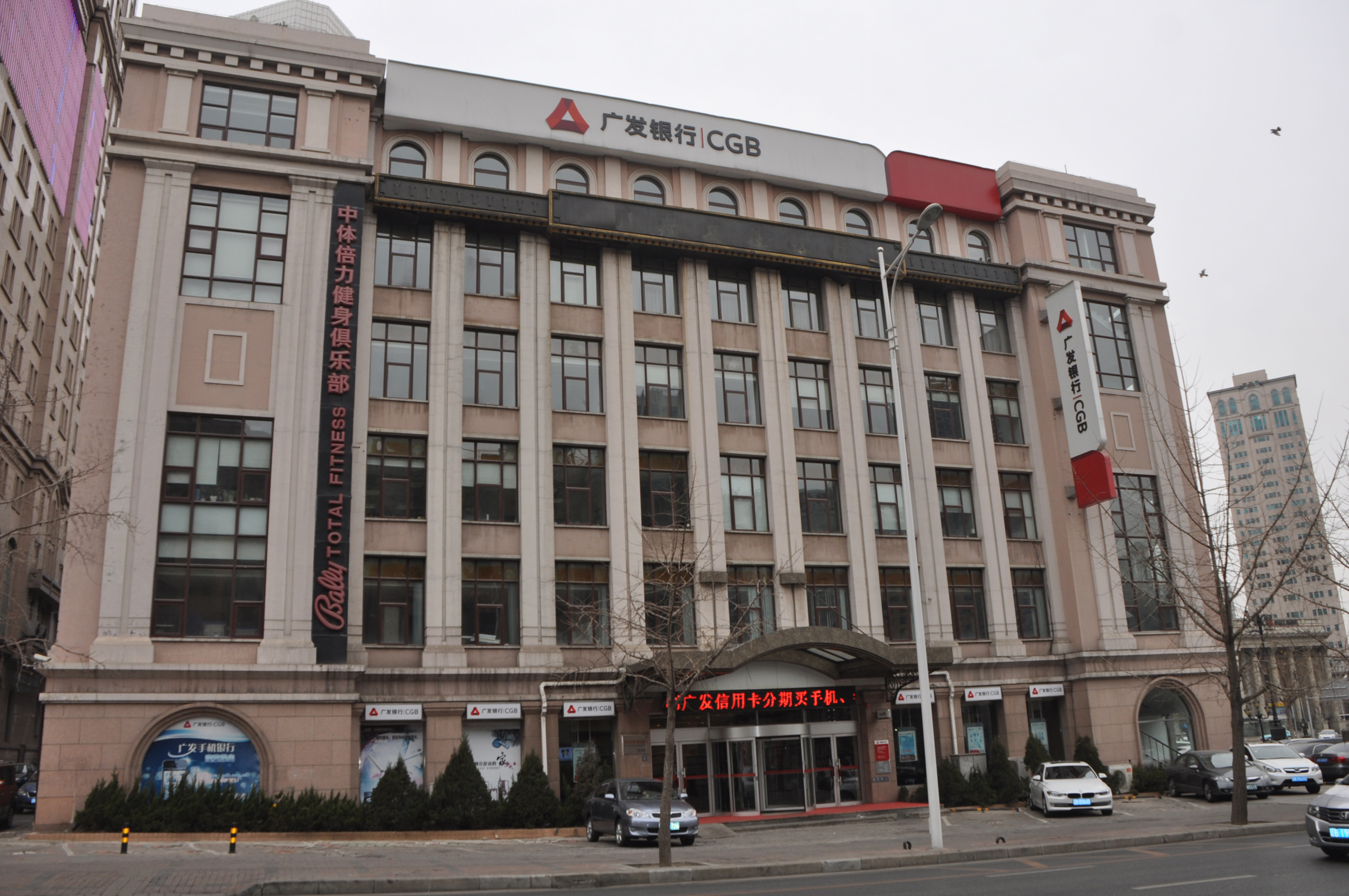
- Branch in Dalian
- Company type: Joint stock company
- Industry: Banking, Finance
- Founded: September 1988
- Headquarters: Guangzhou, Guangdong, People's Republic of China
- Key people: Mr. Morris Li – President and Executive Director
- Products: Financial services
- Website: www.cgbchina.com.cn

China Guangfa Bank
- Traditional Chinese: 廣發銀行
- Simplified Chinese: 广发银行
Transcriptions
Standard Mandarin
- Hanyu Pinyin: Guǎng Fā Yínháng
Yue: Cantonese
- Yale Romanization: Gwóng Faat Ngán Hòhng
- Jyutping: Gwong2 Faat3 Ngan2 Hong4

Logo during the period of Guangdong Development Bank

China Guangfa Bank (simplified Chinese: 广发银行; traditional Chinese: 廣發銀行; pinyin: Guǎng Fā Yínháng, abbr: CGB) is a commercial banking corporation headquartered in Guangzhou, People's Republic of China. The bank was established in September 1988 as Guangdong Development Bank (simplified Chinese: 广东发展银行; traditional Chinese: 廣東發展銀行; pinyin: Guǎngdōng Fāzhǎn Yínháng). As CGB's largest shareholder, Citigroup has a 20% stake, while IBM holds 4.74%. China Life and State Grid each owns 20%, CITIC Trust, 12.85% and Puhua will hold the remaining 8% of the equity sold.

CGB offers a broad range of financial services including personal and corporate banking, asset management, wealth management, broker-dealer and advisory services, issuance services, and treasury services. It has more than 500 branches in mainland China, Hong Kong and Macau. Based in the Guangdong province bordering Hong Kong, GDB has assets of $265.8 billion (1.648 trillion RMB) as of the end of 2014, with its network expanded to include 34 branches, 661 business outlets, 114 Small Enterprises Banking Centers and 13 smart banks in 71 cities at prefecture level or above in 16 provinces (municipalities and autonomous regions). The Bank has over 9 million e-banking customers, over 27 million credit cards issued and correspondent bank partnerships with 1,687 bank headquarters and their branches in more than 128 countries and regions. It is the first financial institution to establish the strategic cooperation of multi-channel and multi-application e-payment with China UnionPay.
