= ICBC UBS Asset Management =

ICBC UBS joint venture

ICBC UBS Asset Management Co., Ltd.
- Native name: 工銀瑞信基金管理有限公司
- Formerly: ICBC Credit Suisse Asset Management
- Company type: Joint venture
- Industry: Financial services
- Founded: 21 June 2005; 20 years ago
- Headquarters: Beijing, China
- Key people: Zhao Guicai (Chairman); Chong Gao (CEO)
- AUM: US$320 billion (September 2025)
- Owners: Industrial and Commercial Bank of China (80%); UBS (20%)
- Website: www.icbcubs.com.cn

ICBC UBS Asset Management (ICBCUBS; Chinese: 工銀瑞信基金管理; pinyin: Gōngyín Ruìxìn Jījīn Guǎnlǐ) is a Chinese asset management company founded in 2005. It was a joint venture (JV) between Industrial and Commercial Bank of China (ICBC) and Credit Suisse that was later acquired by UBS.

== History ==
ICBC Credit Suisse Asset Management (ICBCCS) was founded in June 2005 as a Qualified Domestic Institutional Investor by Industrial and Commercial Bank of China, Credit Suisse and COSCO. They held stakes of 55%, 25% and 20% respectively. ICBCCS officially launched on 5 July 2005, and on 26 July, it launched its first equity fund, The Core Value Equity Fund which raised $530 million. Prior to this banks such as ICBC were only allowed to sell third-party funds.

In its first year of operation, ICBCCS had some initial setbacks where it saw a 51% drop in assets under management from $493 million to $240 million in the first quarter of 2006. Analysts blamed ICBC which was believed to have encouraged its 370,000 employees and its clients to invest in ICBCCS funds. Demand for equity mutual funds in China had fallen sharply since mid-2004 due to poor stock market returns. However afterwards ICBCCS had become quite profitable.

In September 2009, battered by losses because of falling shipping rates, COSCO sold its 20% stake in ICBCCS for $37.8 million to raise cash. The sale of the stake was conducted through the China Beijing Equity Exchange from 29 September to 3 November. According to the pilot rules for bank JV ownership and management in China at the time, only state-owned commercial banks with experience in managing asset management companies could bid to acquire a fund management company. In addition the buyer would be required to be vetted by the China Securities Regulatory Commission, China Banking Regulatory Commission and People's Bank of China. As a result, the bidding list was quite restricted and there were not many bidders. By October that year, it was determined that ICBC would be acquiring COSCO's stake. The acquisition was seen as a sign of consolidation in the industry of China where domestic companies were acquiring more control from their foreign partners over their JVs. On 16 November 2011, the deal was completed with ICBC acquiring 20% of ICBCCS from COSCO and 5% from Credit Suisse which increased ICBC's stake in ICBCCS to 80%.

In February 2012, ICBCCS launched its international arm in Hong Kong. It was named ICBC Credit Suisse Asset Management (International) and was licensed by the Securities and Futures Commission.

In July 2023, after the Acquisition of Credit Suisse by UBS, it was announced by UBS that it had halted plans to set up a new fund unit in China and instead decided to maintain ownership over ICBCCS. China regulations stated that any company can own no more than two fund management firms in the market. UBS had already two firms in China which were ICBCCS and another JV, UBS SDIC Fund Management.

In June 2025, the company's name was changed to ICBC UBS Asset Management.
