= E Fund Management =

Chinese asset manager

E Fund Management Co., Ltd.
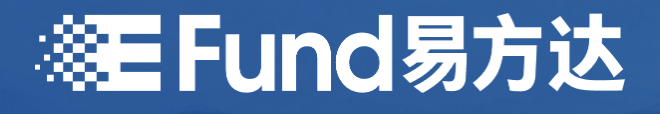

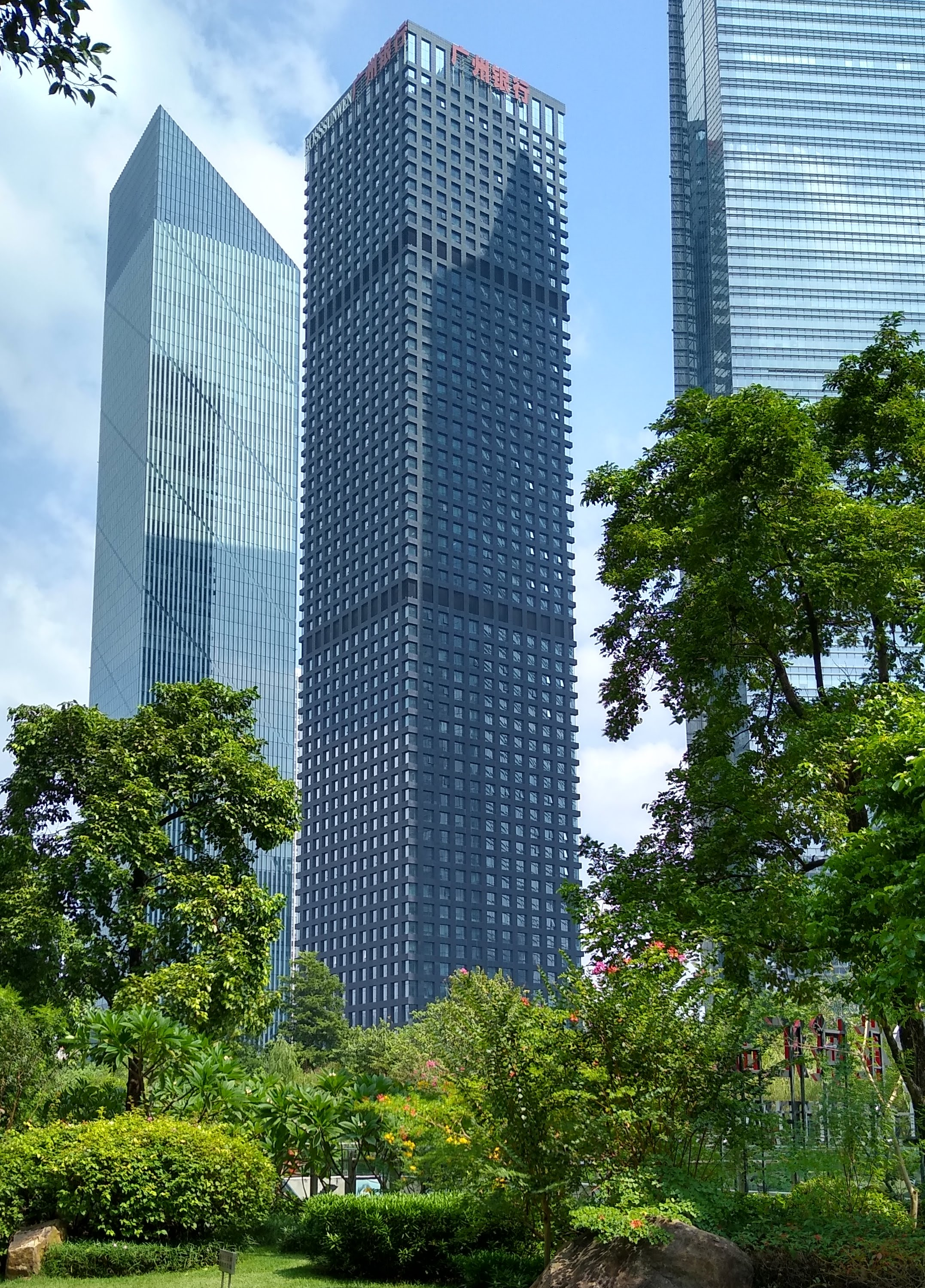
- Headquarters at Bank of Guangzhou Tower
- Native name: 易方达基金管理有限公司
- Company type: Private
- Industry: Financial services
- Founded: April 17, 2001; 25 years ago
- Headquarters: Guangzhou, China
- AUM: US$571 billion (November 2025)
- Owners: GF Securities (22.65%); Guangdong Yuecai Trust (22.65%); Infore Group (22.65%); Guangdong Rising Holdings Group (15.1%); Guangzhou Guangyong State Owned Assets Management (7.55%)
- Subsidiaries: E Fund Management (Hong Kong) Co., Limited
- Website: www.efunds.com.cn

E Fund Management (Chinese: 易方达基金管理) is a Chinese asset management company founded in 2001. It is considered the largest asset management company in China.

== History ==
The company was established on 17 April 2001. The initial shareholders were GF Securities, Guangdong Yuecai Trust, Guangdong Securities (liquidated in 2005), Chongqing International Trust, Tianjin Trust and Northern International Trust.

In 2004, the Midea Group acquired the company's shares from Tianjin Trust and Northern International Trust and in 2005, increased its ownership to 25% after acquiring Guangdong Securities' stake. In 2007, the Midea group transferred its entire stake in the company to the Infore Group. He Jianfeng (son of Midea Group founder He Xiangjian) is considered to be the owner of the Infore Group.

In 2008, the company established a Hong Kong Subsidiary named E Fund Management (Hong Kong) Co., Limited.

The company's flagship mutual fund is the E Fund Blue Chip Selected Mixed Fund which had $8.3 billion in assets under management as of April 2023. In 2020 it has a return of 95% in 2020 which attracted significant subscriptions but in 2021 and 2022 it dropped 10% and 16% respectively.
