= China Southern Asset Management =

Chinese asset manager

China Southern Asset Management Co., Ltd.
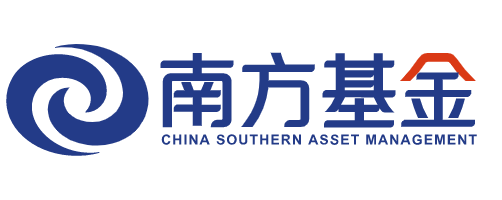

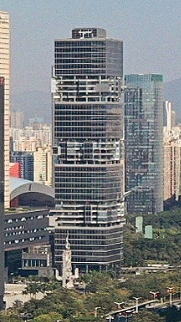
- Headquarters in Shenzhen
- Native name: 南方基金管理股份有限公司
- Company type: Private
- Industry: Financial services
- Founded: 6 March 1998; 28 years ago
- Headquarters: Shenzhen, Guangdong, China
- AUM: US$284 billion (September 2023)
- Owners: Huatai Securities (41.16%); Shenzhen Investment Holdings Co., Ltd (27.44%)
- Subsidiaries: CSOP Asset Management
- Website: www.nffund.com

China Southern Asset Management (Chinese: 南方基金管理股份有限公司; pinyin: Nánfāng jījīn guǎnlǐ gǔfèn yǒuxiàn gōngsī) is a Chinese asset management company founded in 1998. It is considered one of the largest asset management companies in China.

== History ==
The company was established on 6 March 1998, as one of the first local asset management companies in China that was approved by the China Securities Regulatory Commission.

=== CSOP Asset Management ===
In 2008, the company set up a joint venture in Hong Kong with Oriental Patron. The joint venture was named CSOP Asset Management with China Southern Asset Management paying HK$140 million for a 70% stake and Oriental Patron paying HK$60 million for the remaining 30%. CSOP Asset management currently has several Exchange-traded funds (ETFs) on the Hong Kong Stock Exchange.

In December 2022, it launched the first Bitcoin and Ethereum futures ETFs in Hong Kong.

In July 2024, CSOP launched an ETF that focused on Saudi Arabian stocks that was listed on the Shenzhen Stock Exchange. It was popular amongst Chinese investors where it hit the first-day price limit and raised 634 million yuan (US$87 million). It offered Chinese investors convenient access to markets in Saudi Arabia in areas such as energy and oil which were previously difficult to access due to overseas regulations.

In March 2025, CSOP launched Asia's first single-stock L&I products providing 2x leveraged or 2x inverse exposure to single stocks like Nvidia, Tesla, and Coinbase.

== Regulatory issues ==
In 2008, Wang Limin who was previously a manager at China Southern Asset Management was banned for seven years from participating in China's capital markets and fined 500,000 RMB after making a profit of 1.5 million RMB via Rat Trading. This involved buying shares in companies his funds invested in and then selling them for a profit.
