= Qualified Domestic Institutional Investor =

Allows Chinese individuals to invest in foreign securities

Qualified Domestic Institutional Investor (Chinese: 合格境内机构投资者; pinyin: Hégé Jìngnèi Jīgòu Tóuzīzhě; also known as QDII) is a scheme relating to the capital market set up to allow financial institutions to invest in offshore markets such as securities and bonds. Similar to QFII (Qualified Foreign Institutional Investor), it is a transitional arrangement which provides limited opportunities for domestic investors to access foreign markets at a stage where a country/territory's currency is not traded or floated completely freely and where capital is not able to move completely freely in and out of the country.

== QDII in China ==
In People's Republic of China, QDII allows investors to invest in foreign securities markets via certain fund management institutions, insurance companies, securities companies and other assets management institutions which have been approved by the China Securities Regulatory Commission (CSRC).

On 13 April 2006, the Chinese government announced the QDII scheme, allowing Chinese institutions and residents to entrust Chinese commercial banks to invest in financial products overseas. But the investment was limited to fixed-income and money market products.

After granting 15 banks and funds a total quota of US$14.2 billion to invest overseas, the Chinese government announced on 11 May 2007 to widen the scope of the QDII investment. With certain restriction, banks can now offer stocks related products. The net value of a QDII product investing in stocks must not exceed 50%, with the net value represented by a single stock capped at 5%. The minimum commitment by each client is 300,000 yuan. Also, the stocks invested or the fund linked must be listed on or approved by the area that have signed memorandums of understanding with the CSRC.

In November 2007, Premier Wen Jiabao stated the need to further study the scheme for individual Mainland Chinese residents to invest in stocks in Hong Kong.

On April 8, 2008, an agreement between the China Banking Regulatory Commission and the U.S. Securities and Exchange Commission made it possible for Chinese individuals to invest in the US stock market.

== Wenzhou pilot program ==
In April, 2012, it was announced that "Beijing’s latest financial reform will allow local residents in the wealthy city of Wenzhou to make investments abroad". The pilot program was not explicitly linked to QDII but came at the same time as an expansion of the QFII quota, the latter which allows investment in Chinese public markets with offshore foreign currencies and, in the RQFII, offshore renminbi. While the QFII announcement was seen as a potential threat to Hong Kong as a financial center, Hong Kong is considered likely one of the first investment destinations for Wenzhou investors. "Premier Wen Jiabao says the central government is determined to break the mainland's banking monopoly, and if [the Wenzhou] pilot schemes in the special financial zone newly set up ... prove successful they can be promoted and implemented nationwide", the South China Morning Post reported.

== See also ==
- Qualified Foreign Institutional Investor (QFII)
- China Securities Regulatory Commission
- State Administration of Foreign Exchange (SAFE)
- Economy of China
- Chinese financial system
- Banking in China
