= Tianyan Capital =

Chinese financial company

Tianyan Capital Limited
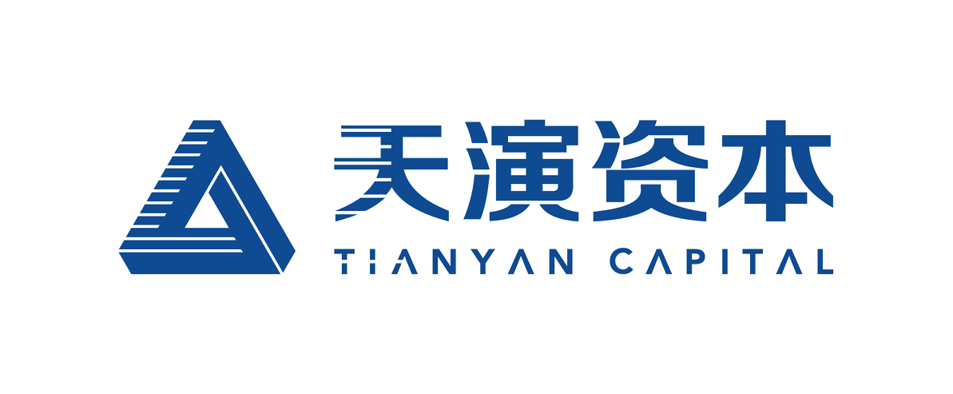
- Native name: 上海天演私募基金管理有限公司
- Type: Private
- Industry: Investment management
- Founded: August 2014; 12 years ago
- Founders: Xie Xiaoyang; Zhang Sen
- Headquarters: Shanghai, China
- Products: Hedge funds Quantitative finance
- AUM: US$4.5 billion (2025)
- Number of employees: 113 (2025)
- Website: www.tianyancapital.com

Tianyan Capital (Tianyan; Chinese: 天演资本; pinyin: Tiānyǎn Zīběn) is a hedge fund management firm founded in 2014 that is headquartered in Shanghai. It also maintains offices in Beijing, Shenzhen, and Hong Kong. It is one of the largest quantitative funds in China.

== History ==
In 2014, Tianyan Capital was founded in China by Xie Xiaoyang (also known as Chris Xie) and Zhang Sen. That same year, the firm completed its registration as a private fund manager with the Asset Management Association of China.

In early 2015, Tianyan Capital launched its first contractual private fund, marking the official start of its asset management business. The firm introduced its market neutral strategy in 2017, followed by an index enhancement strategy in 2018 and a quantitative stock selection strategy in 2019.

In March 2021, a Securities and Futures Commission (SFC) regulated affiliate named Tianyan Capital Limited was established in Hong Kong. The entity was granted the Type 9 (Asset Management) license by the SFC in September 2021.

In January 2025, the firm launched the "Leave No Trace" environmental initiative, organizing mountain cleanup activities to promote sustainability.

== See also ==
- High-Flyer
- Ubiquant
- Hedge fund industry in China
