= Yanfu Investments =

China-based quantitative hedge fund

Shanghai Yanfu Investments Co., Ltd.
- Native name: 上海衍复投资管理有限公司
- Company type: Private
- Industry: Investment management
- Founded: April 2019; 7 years ago
- Founder: Gao Kang
- Headquarters: Shanghai, China
- Products: Hedge funds Quantitative finance
- AUM: US$7.7 billion (June 2024)
- Number of employees: 68 (2024)
- Website: yanfuinvestments.com

Yanfu Investments (Yanfu; Chinese: 衍复投资; pinyin: Yǎnfù Tóuzī) is a hedge fund management firm founded in 2019 that is headquartered in Shanghai. It is one of the largest quantitative funds in China.

== Background ==
In 2010, Massachusetts Institute of Technology graduate Gao Kang was hired as analyst to work at Two Sigma in the U.S. On 5 February 2014 after winning a job at Citadel LLC in Chicago, Gao resigned from Two Sigma. Six days later, he was arrested during his exit interview. Two Sigma claimed Gao used decompiler programs to access unauthorized confidential code and made copies of them. Two Sigma obtained a copy of a letter from Gao to U.S. immigration officials indicating his intention to resign from his job and start a company in China. Gao plead guilty in exchange for a 10-month sentence.

In 2015 Gao returned to China where he joined quantitative fund Ruitian Investment. He played a significant role in Ruitian Investment where in 2019, it became one of the four largest quantitative funds in China. In May 2019, Gao left Ruitian Investment due to disagreement in its future direction and took the Alpha strategy team and code with him. Gao's departure was considered a significant blow to Ruitian Investment.

In July 2019, Gao and his team established Yanfu. The team developed in 2016 under Ruitian Investment consisted of experienced employees who had previously worked at other quantitative funds in the U.S. or top domestic technology companies. The firm grew quickly and within one year, it had already exceeded 10 billion yuan in assets under management.

For a few years, Yanfu stopped taking in money from investors due to the stock market decline in China. However, in November 2022, it was reported that Yanfu reopened all its products to investors.

In February 2024, in what was known as "quant quake", regulators cracked down on quantitative funds in China which had an adverse effect for many due to investor withdrawals and asset declines. However Yanfu used to the opportunity to generate superior returns and became one of the four largest quantitative funds in China. Yanfu launched a new index-enhanced product tracking the CSI All-Share Index to sooth investor concerns over concentration in small caps.

In July 2024, Yanfu published an article in defending quantitative funds in response to pundits blaming them for any market fluctuation and calling for them to be banned following regulatory tightening. Yanfu stated quantitative funds were lowering their trading frequency and extending their holding periods. In addition it stated its long-only stock approach is its main strategy.

== See also ==
- High-Flyer
- Ubiquant
- Lingjun Investment
- Minghong Investment
- Hedge fund industry in China
