= Wuchuan, Guangdong =

Wuchuan 吴川市 Wuchwan
- County-level city
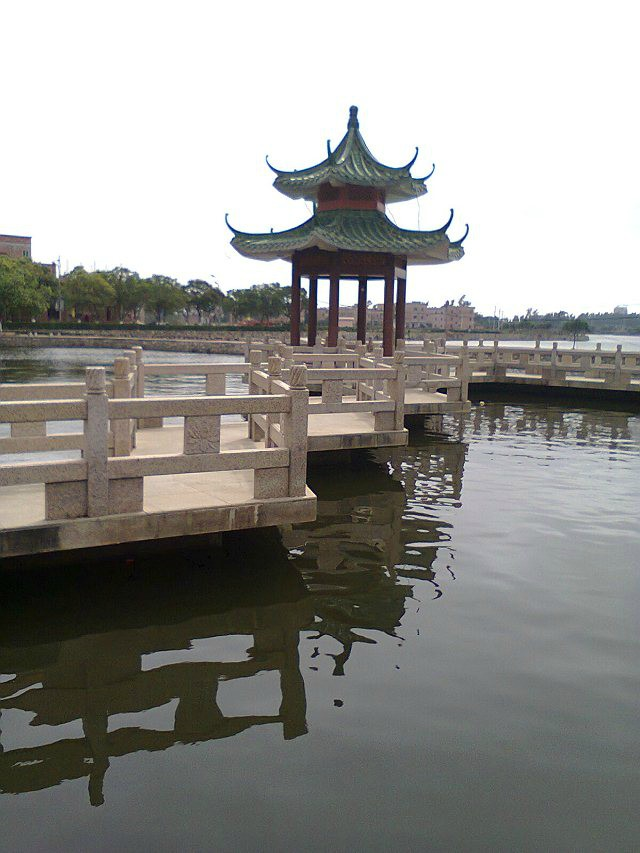

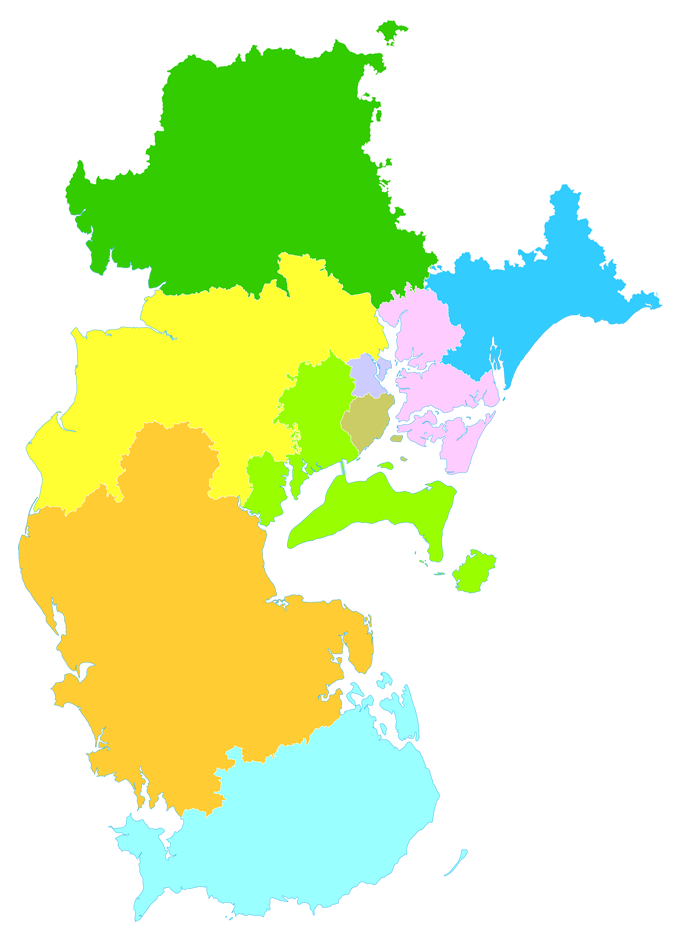
- On this map of Zhanjiang, Wuchuan is the easternmost part, shown in light blue next to the region in pink.

- Location in Guangdong
- Coordinates: 21°26′28″N 110°46′44″E
- Country: People's Republic of China
- Province: Guangdong
- Prefecture-level city: Zhanjiang

Area
  - Total: 848 km^{2} (327 sq mi)

Population (2020 census)
  - Total: 907,354
  - Density: 1,070/km^{2} (2,770/sq mi)
- Time zone: UTC+8 (China Standard)
- Website: Official website

Wuchuan, Guangdong
- Traditional Chinese: 吳川
- Simplified Chinese: 吴川
- Literal meaning: Wu River(s)
Transcriptions
Standard Mandarin
- Hanyu Pinyin: Wúchuān
- Wade–Giles: Wu-chʻuan

Wuchuan (Note: Also formerly romanized as Woo-chuen and Wu-ch'uen.) is a county-level city in southwestern Guangdong province, China. It is the easternmost county-level division of the prefecture-level city of Zhanjiang. Wuchuan covers an area of 848 square kilometers (327 sq mi), with a population of 907,354 as of 2020.

== History ==
Under the Sui dynasty, Wuchuan was a small county known as Wujiang located along the Jian River. By 1722, Wuchuan was administered from Gaozhou. (now a county-level city within the neighboring Maoming Prefecture). On May 26, 1994, the Ministry of Civil Affairs of the People's Republic of China approved the elevation of Wuchuan County to county-level city status and placed it under the administration of Zhanjiang.

== Geography ==
Wuchuan is located on the Jian River where it flows into the South China Sea, on the eastern coast of the Leizhou Peninsula. It borders Zhanjiang's Potou District to the west, Lianjiang to the southwest, Huazhou to the north, and the Maoming districts of Maonan and Dianbai to the east and northeast. The time zone for Wuchuan, as with all locations in the People's Republic of China, is Beijing Time (GMT +8).

== Climate ==
Climate data for Wuchuan, elevation 27 m (89 ft), (1991–2020 normals, extremes 1981–present)
Month	Jan	Feb	Mar	Apr	May	Jun	Jul	Aug	Sep	Oct	Nov	Dec	Year
Record high °C (°F)	27.4 (81.3)	30.7 (87.3)	30.6 (87.1)	33.6 (92.5)	36.0 (96.8)	37.7 (99.9)	38.5 (101.3)	38.5 (101.3)	37.0 (98.6)	35.4 (95.7)	33.0 (91.4)	28.8 (83.8)	38.5 (101.3)
Mean daily maximum °C (°F)	20.0 (68.0)	20.7 (69.3)	23.5 (74.3)	26.3 (79.3)	29.7 (85.5)	31.3 (88.3)	31.4 (88.5)	31.6 (88.9)	31.3 (88.3)	29.2 (84.6)	26.2 (79.2)	21.4 (70.5)	26.9 (80.4)
Daily mean °C (°F)	16.1 (61.0)	17.1 (62.8)	20.3 (68.5)	23.4 (74.1)	27.1 (80.8)	28.7 (83.7)	28.7 (83.7)	28.4 (83.1)	27.7 (81.9)	25.2 (77.4)	22.3 (72.1)	17.3 (63.1)	23.5 (74.4)
Mean daily minimum °C (°F)	13.7 (56.7)	14.9 (58.8)	18.2 (64.8)	21.5 (70.7)	25.1 (77.2)	26.5 (79.7)	26.6 (79.9)	26.0 (78.8)	25.1 (77.2)	22.3 (72.1)	19.6 (67.3)	14.5 (58.1)	21.2 (70.1)
Record low °C (°F)	2.7 (36.9)	4.3 (39.7)	5.1 (41.2)	11.4 (52.5)	16.8 (62.2)	19.2 (66.6)	22.6 (72.7)	22.4 (72.3)	17.3 (63.1)	13.6 (56.5)	6.7 (44.1)	4.0 (39.2)	2.7 (36.9)
Average precipitation mm (inches)	35.2 (1.39)	32.2 (1.27)	49.3 (1.94)	129.0 (5.08)	181.1 (7.13)	249.5 (9.82)	236.7 (9.32)	280.2 (11.03)	201.2 (7.92)	90.8 (3.57)	32.5 (1.28)	37.1 (1.46)	1,554.8 (61.21)
Average precipitation days (≥ 0.1 mm)	6.0	8.4	9.4	11.0	14.0	15.4	14.2	16.8	14.0	6.7	5.1	5.2	126.2
Average relative humidity (%)	78	84	86	87	86	85	84	84	81	75	74	73	81
Mean monthly sunshine hours	128.3	98.8	92.0	122.9	180.4	197.6	232.9	212.7	201.3	216.0	183.6	153.8	2,020.3
Percentage possible sunshine	38	31	25	32	44	49	57	54	55	60	55	46	46
Source: China Meteorological Administrationall-time record low

== Culture ==
=== Language ===
Three main language varieties are spoken in Wuchuan.

- Baihua 白话: a Yue Chinese dialect
- Donghua 东话 (also known as Leihua 雷话): a Southern Min Chinese dialect spoken in Lanshi 兰石, Tanba 覃巴, and Wangcungang 王村港
- Haihua 海话 (also known as Jizhao 吉兆话): spoken on the coast

In Zhanjiang's northern downtown districts, the spoken language is primarily Cantonese, while Leizhou Min is the prestige language in Mazhang District, Leizhou City, and other nearby counties. The dialect spoken in Lianjiang County is Hakka.

The Jianjiang drainage basin is a region where people of Han nationality and other Baiyue ethnic groups have lived together throughout history. Local authorities subordinated to a central government of Han nationality have existed since the Northern and Southern Dynasties. The establishment of local governments such as Luzhou and Gaozhou and their close relationships with Guangzhou have promoted the Hanization of the local Baiyue ethnic groups, leading to the formation of Wuchuan-Huazhou Cantonese, a dialect of Chinese.

=== Folk Custom ===
==== Piaose ====
Piaose is a major folk art from Guangdong province. It has disappeared from many parts of the province but is still a part of life and culture. Wuchuan Piaose has aesthetic, artistic, and humanistic value and is considered special in the way it is designed, including its content. Wuchuan Piaose is also challenged by outside cultural influences, funding issues, publicity, and the need to develop artists.

In July 2009, Wuchuan Piaose was performed at the Chengdu International Intangible Cultural Heritage Festival.

==== Clay sculpture ====
Clay sculpture is considered an "original art" form, with its ancient origins reflecting its status as one of the earliest human arts. Clay sculpture not only documents folk life but also creates a vibrant artistic space. The regional and stable nature of clay sculpture art represents the values and aesthetic experiences of its people. Protecting its "cultural difference" and aesthetic diversity is crucial for the preservation and survival of contemporary clay sculpture art in China.

==== Years-cases ====
Years-cases are traditional activities unique to western Guangdong, centered around local deities. This festival features elaborate sacrificial ceremonies and rituals that are performed as a unified event. Years-cases consist of four main components: the gods of years-cases, the rituals, the opera, and the feast.

The gods of years-cases form the core of the festival. This chapter focuses on the evolution of the gods' images, which have become increasingly complex. There are two major patterns in the changes of these images: one involves the combination of multiple gods' images, while the other features different gods within the same ritual. These changes reflect the evolving ideas and concepts of the community.

The parade of gods is the most crucial part of the years-cases ritual, embodying the community's culture and beliefs. Field surveys of Beiyue village's rituals will be used as examples to examine these patterns. Further studies are planned on the secularization and commercialization of years-cases.

The opera of years-cases primarily involves nighttime performances. The ritual and opera must complement each other, with actors also serving as priests. The opera allegorizes the themes of years-cases.

The feast of years-cases is also a ritual, where food is symbolically consumed. This process reflects local eating habits and supports the pig and poultry industries in Wuchuan.

== Historic locations ==
- Maoshan Ancient Academy: A library established 1,700 years ago by Wang Jun. It is located in Bo Pu Zhen, Wuchuan.
- Xiangshan Ancient Temple: Originally built in 283, the Xiangshan Temple has been rebuilt several times. It is currently situated in Popu, Wuchuan.

== Famous persons ==
- Lin Shaotang (1786–1872), an ethnic Putianese from Wu Yang Zhen, was one of the champions of the Imperial Examination. He was one of the few overseas ethnic Putian Min champions.
- Chen Lanbin (1816–1895) was a minister and scholar of the late Qing dynasty, born in Huang Po Zhen. He was the first Chinese ambassador to the United States.
- Li Hanhun (1894–1987) graduated from Baoding Army Officer School in 1919. In 1926, he participated in the Northern Expedition. During the Second Sino-Japanese War, he served as an army colonel, commander of an Army Group, and chairman of the Guangdong provincial government.
- Liu Huaqiu (1939–) is the deputy director of the Center for International Economic Exchanges.
- Yu Yilong (1965–) is a renowned Chinese hard pen calligrapher.
- Liang Wenfeng (1985–) Chinese entrepreneur and businessman who is the co-founder of the quantitative hedge fund High-Flyer, as well as the founder and CEO of its artificial intelligence company DeepSeek.

== Education ==
As of 2013, Wuchuan has 468 schools at all levels, including 1 teacher training school, 11 middle schools, and 296 primary schools. The total student enrollment is 206,202, comprising 97,778 high school students, 77,179 primary school students, and a number of nursery school students.

- Wuchuan No. 1 Middle School: Founded on November 11, 1927, Wuchuan No. 1 Middle School is the most renowned school in Wuchuan. Each year, approximately 3,000 students graduate from this school, and many of them gain admission to prestigious universities.
- Wuchuan No. 3 Middle School: Established in 1964, Wuchuan No. 3 Middle School has developed rapidly and is considered one of the top middle schools in Wuchuan.
