= CVCA =

CVCA may refer to the following:

- Chula Vista, California
- Cuyahoga Valley Christian Academy
- China Venture Capital Association
- Chicago Vocational Career Academy
