= Hedge fund industry in China =

Chinese financial industry

The hedge fund industry in China was established in the early 1990s, and has so far undergone four stages: infancy, formation, rapid expansion, and adjustment and standardization.

== Categories ==
Currently hedge funds in China fall into two categories. One is those companies backed up by the government, including brokers managing pooled property, trust and investment companies' trust and investment projects, and investment companies managing their own capital. The other is private hedge funds. Under the name of "Investment Consulting Company" or "Investment Management Company", they provide management for pooled property.

== Share of GDP ==
Data showed that hedge funds account for 0.6% of the GDP in the US, 0.35% in Europe, 0.2% in Asia, while only 0.1% in China. It is expected that China's GDP would quadruple in 10 years time and hedge funds would be about 0.4% of the country's GDP. In this case, China's hedge funds would expand 12-fold, and place China second in the world for hedge fund investments.

== Examples ==
Examples of notable private hedge funds include Greenwoods Asset Management, Perseverance Asset Management and Pinpoint Asset Management. The largest quantitative funds in China include High-Flyer, Ubiquant, Lingjun Investment, Minghong Investment and Yanfu Investments.

== See also ==
- Asset Management Association of China
- Commodity trading in China
- Banking in China
- Financial services in China
- China Venture Capital Association
