= Jian River (Guangdong) =

River in China

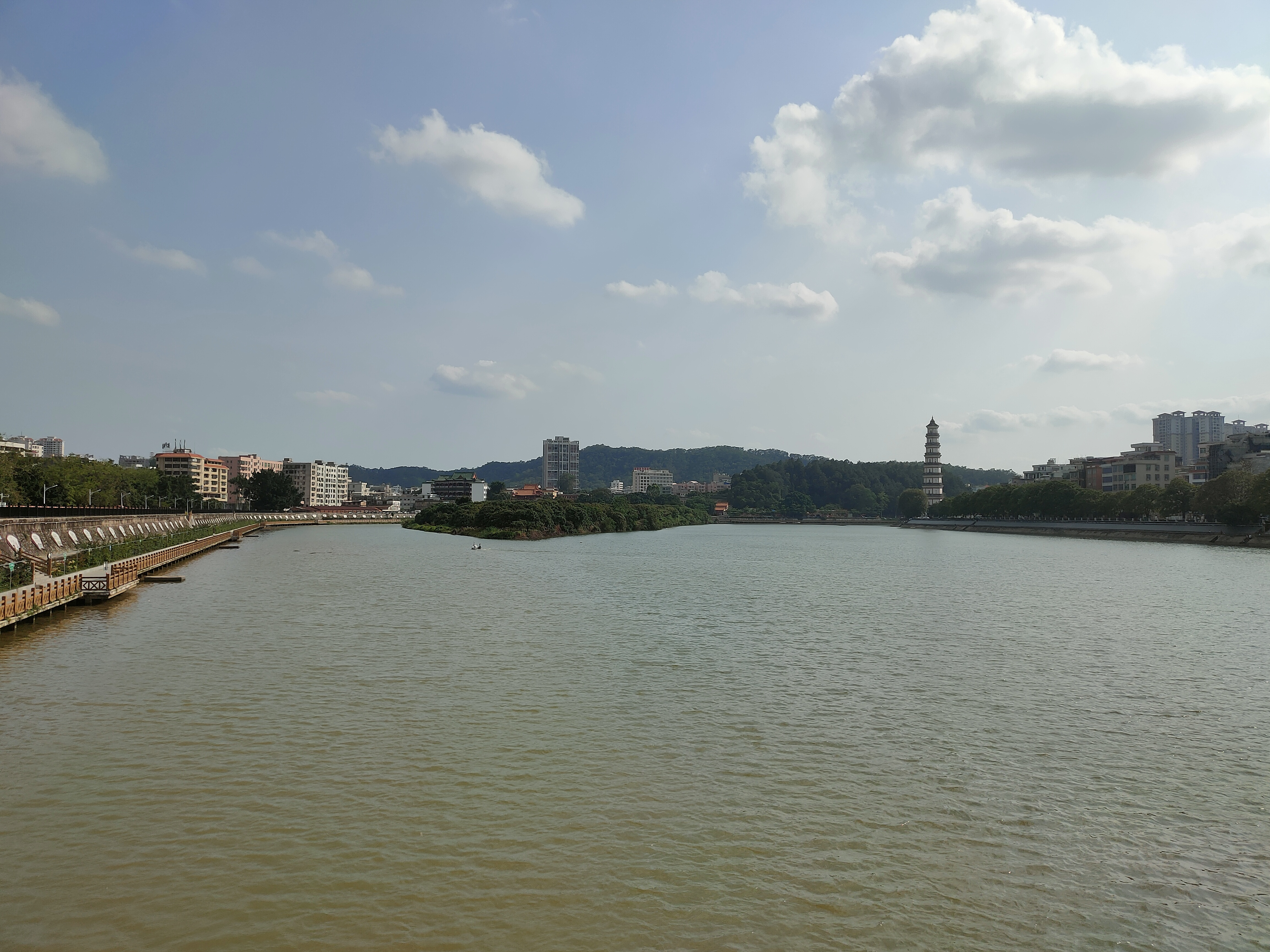

Jian River (Chinese: 鉴江), also known as the Jianjiang River and the Ganjiang River, is the largest river in western Guangdong, China. It has a total length of 232 kilometres (144 mi), and a basin area of 9464 square kilometres. It originates from Tiger Leopard Pit (Chinese: Zhangyang Pit) in the village of Zhuangdong, at the foot of the Yunkai Mountain, in northern Xinyi. The urban areas of Xinyi, Huazhou, Gaozhou and Wuchuan are all located along Jianjiang.

== Overview ==
=== Xinyi Section ===
The upstream mainstream of the Dongjiang River flows from Hawbaokeng and travels counterclockwise for more than 20 kilometers in the northeast-southeast direction to Dapo Village, Xinyichidong Town. There, the stream absorbs several tributaries and grows in width. The Dongjiang River passes through Xinyi from north to south, and about 80 kilometers south, the Xijiang River, originating from Jindongling in the northwestern part of the self-confident Yi, merges into Zhenlong Town. After the two rivers meet, it is called the Jianjiang River.

=== Gaozhou Section ===
The Jianjiang River enters the territory of Gaozhou in the south, and flows through Tantou Town until Dajing Town and Dajing River merge. The river gradually opens up and the Nantang River flows into the bank of Guchi Lake in Nantang Town. After reaching Caojiang Town, the main tributary Caojiang River begins to merge into Jianjiang River. After the river reaches Gaozhou City, the slope reduces, the river bed widens, and the flow rate slows. Alluvial sediments from the upstream settle here to form sandbanks. At Shatian Town Market, the Shatian River flows into it, turning to the south, entering Zhenjiang Town and Shigu Town and leaving Gaozhou.

=== Huazhou Section ===
The Jianjiang River continues south for more than 50 kilometers, from Gaozhou, to reach the territory of Huazhou. When flowing through Huazhou City, the Luojiang River, the largest first-level tributary of the Jianjiang River, joins the Jianjiang River here. From here, the river slope is further reduced, the river erosion transitions from vertical to horizontal, and the river surface continues to widen.

=== Wuchuan Section ===
Jianjiang travels more than 20 kilometers to the south and enters Wuchuan in Nanchao Village. The Jianjiang River, which reaches the middle and lower reaches of the river, becomes very open, and part of the river surface can reach up to 1000 metres during the flood season. The Niaohua River and the Meijiang River merge into the Jianjiang River near Meisu Street in the urban area of Wuchuan. After the Jianjiang River reaches Meilu, several tributaries have been injected, and there is a massive water flow. Part of the water flows through the Tangwei Flood Diversion River, built in the 1960s to the sea, and the remaining water flows from Huangpo to the mouth of Shajiao Xuan in Wuyang Town, into the South China Sea.
