= DeepSeek =

Chinese artificial intelligence company

Hangzhou DeepSeek Artificial Intelligence Basic Technology Research Co., Ltd.
- Native name: 杭州深度求索人工智能基础技术研究有限公司
- Type: Private
- Industry: Information technology Artificial intelligence
- Founded: 17 July 2023; 3 years ago
- Founder: Liang Wenfeng
- Headquarters: Hangzhou, Zhejiang, China
- Key people: Liang Wenfeng (CEO)
- Products: DeepSeek
- Owner: High-Flyer
- Number of employees: 396 (2026)
- Website: deepseek.com

Hangzhou DeepSeek Artificial Intelligence Basic Technology Research Co., Ltd., (Note: Chinese: 杭州深度求索人工智能基础技术研究有限公司. Sometimes simply referred to in English as Hangzhou DeepSeek Artificial Intelligence.) doing business as DeepSeek, (Note: Chinese: 深度求索; pinyin: Shēndù Qiúsuǒ) is a Chinese artificial intelligence (AI) company that is known for releasing open-weight large language models (LLMs) and agentic systems designed for low-cost inference and high efficiency. Based in Hangzhou, China, DeepSeek is owned and funded by High-Flyer, a Chinese hedge fund.

DeepSeek was founded in July 2023 by Liang Wenfeng, who also serves as CEO. It launched an eponymous chatbot alongside its DeepSeek-R1 model in January 2025.

Since January 2025, the company offers external users an open license for model parameters, while not offering an open license to training data. According to The New York Times, the company recruits AI (and other fields) researchers from top Chinese universities to broaden its models' knowledge and capabilities.

DeepSeek is considered closely linked to China's defense industry due to its researchers' previous affiliations and the adoption of its chatbot for non-combat roles by the People's Liberation Army since March 2025. According to The New York Times, dozens of DeepSeek researchers have or have previously had affiliations with People's Liberation Army laboratories and the Seven Sons of National Defence. Since 2025, its chatbot has been used in non-combat roles by the People's Liberation Army, including hospitals, the People's Armed Police paramilitary, and national mobilization organizations.

== History ==
=== Pre-founding ===
Liang Wenfeng co-founded the company in June 2015, funded by High-Flyer. By 2021, he had started buying large quantities of Nvidia GPUs for an AI project (which would later become DeepSeek), reportedly obtaining 10,000 Nvidia A100 GPUs before the United States restricted chip sales to China.

=== Founding ===
On 14 April 2023, High-Flyer announced the launch of an artificial general intelligence (AGI) research firm, stating that it would focus on developing AI tools unrelated to the firm's financial business. Two months later, on 17 July 2023, that research firm was spun off into an independent company named DeepSeek.

=== Expansion ===
In September 2026, Bloomberg reported that DeepSeek was planning to deploy a data center in Inner Mongolia hosting 160,000 Huawei Ascend 950DT chips.

== Operations ==
As of July 2026, Liang personally held a 78% stake in DeepSeek through two shell corporations. (Note: 宁波程信柔兆企业管理咨询合伙企业(有限合伙) and 宁波程恩企业管理咨询合伙企业(有限合伙)) In February 2026, Anthropic accused DeepSeek of using thousands of fraudulent accounts to generate millions of conversations with Claude to train its own LLMs via distillation. Initially, venture capital investors were reluctant to provide funding, as they considered it unlikely that the venture would be able to quickly generate an exit (an ownership stake in an investment), however, in May 2026, DeepSeek completed a Series A round receiving US$7 billion, reaching a post-money valuation of US$52 billion. In July 2026, Bloomberg reported the company had begun preparations for an IPO, listing as soon as 2027. In that same month, the company began a separate discussion targeting a US$70 billion pre-money valuation, which was completed in October.

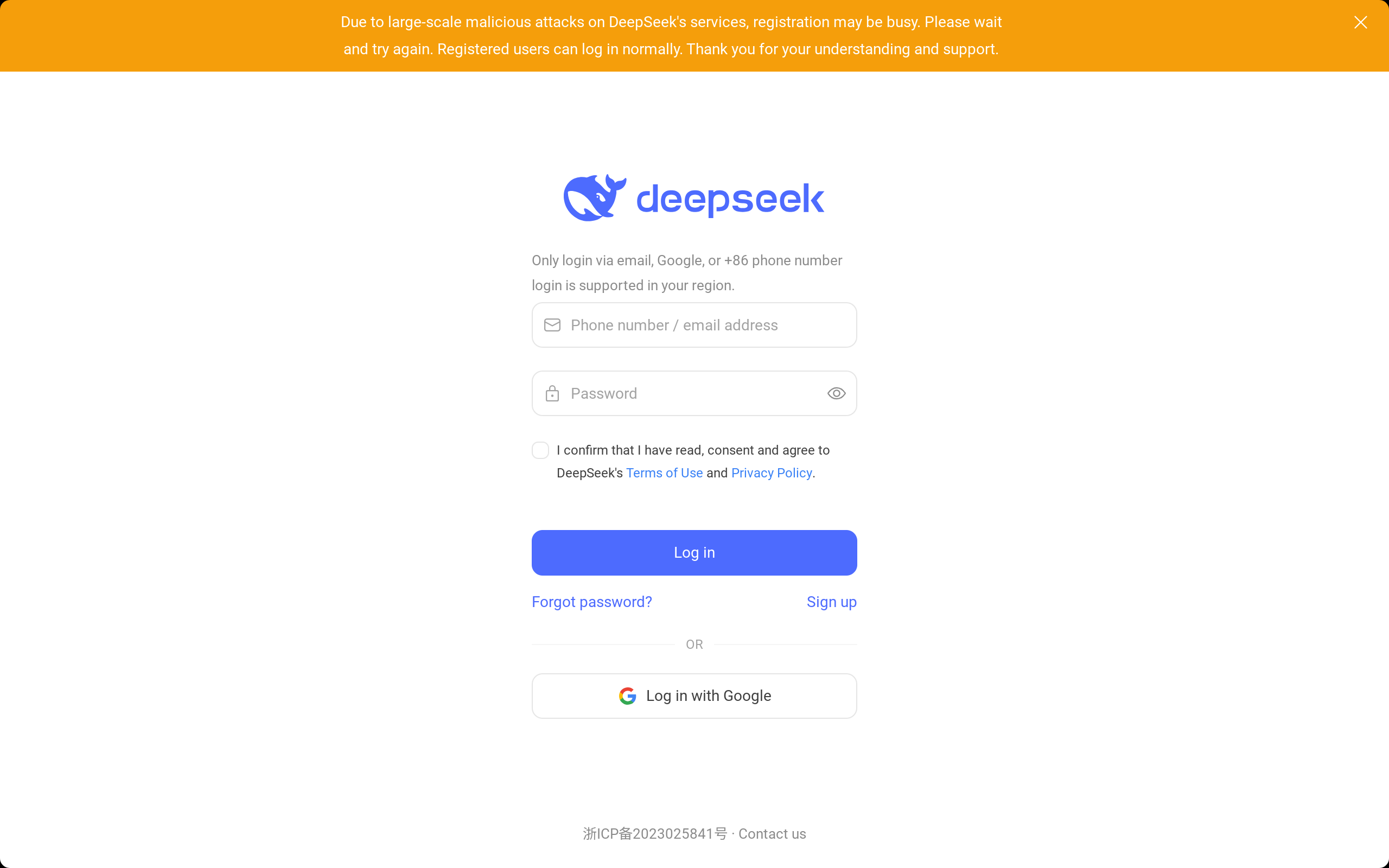
The DeepSeek login page following a cyberattack around its 21 January 2025 launch

== Culture ==
DeepSeek operates with a relaxed, academic research-style workplace culture that deliberately avoids China's "996" overtime practices. (Note: A schedule where employees work from 9:00 AM to 9:00 PM, six days a week.) Liang structured the company to eliminate rigid key performance indicators (KPIs) and mandatory overtime, allowing significant time for unstructured research and creative exploration.

DeepSeek's hiring approach emphasizes skills over lengthy work experience, resulting in many employees joining just after completing university. Likewise, the company recruits individuals without computer science backgrounds to expand the range of expertise incorporated into the models, for instance in poetry or advanced mathematics.

== Strategy ==
In 2024, DeepSeek stated that it focuses on research and does not have immediate plans for commercialization. Its use of open weights and MIT licensing also distinguishes it. US chip export restrictions led DeepSeek to prioritize training and inferencing efficiency over model capability, leveraging available compute and reducing energy consumption.

DeepSeek operates in Africa, offering more affordable and less power-hungry AI solutions. Along with Huawei's storage and cloud computing services, it aided the technology scene in sub-Saharan Africa. DeepSeek offers local data sovereignty and more flexibility compared to western AI platforms.

== Infrastructure ==
High-Flyer/DeepSeek operated at least two primary computing clusters: Fire-Flyer (萤火一号) and Fire-Flyer 2 (萤火二号). Fire-Flyer 1 was constructed in 2019 and was retired after 1.5 years. Fire-Flyer 2 was still in operation as of 2025. Fire-Flyer 2 consists of co-designed software and hardware. On the hardware side, Nvidia GPUs use 200 Gbps interconnects. The cluster is divided into two zones, and the platform supports cross-zone tasks. The network topology was two fat trees, chosen for high bisection bandwidth. On the software side are:

- 3FS (Fire-Flyer File System): A distributed parallel file system designed for asynchronous random reads. It uses Direct I/O and RDMA Read. In contrast to standard Buffered I/O, Direct I/O does not cache data. Caching is useless in this case, since each piece of data read is random and is not reused.
- hfreduce: Library for asynchronous communication, originally designed to replace Nvidia Collective Communication Library (NCCL). It runs asynchronously on the CPU to avoid blocking kernels on the GPU. It uses two-tree broadcast like NCCL.
- hfai.nn: Software library of commonly used operators for neural network training, similar to torch.nn in PyTorch.
- HaiScale Distributed Data Parallel (DDP): Parallel training library that implements various forms of parallelism such as data parallelism (DP), pipeline parallelism (PP), tensor parallelism (TP), experts parallelism (EP), fully sharded data parallel (FSDP) and zero redundancy optimizer (ZeRO).
- HAI Platform: Various applications such as task scheduling, fault handling, and disaster recovery.

As of 2022, Fire-Flyer 2 had 5,000 PCIe A100 GPUs in 625 nodes, each containing 8 GPUs.

== DeepSeek Harness ==
DeepSeek Harness is a company-built open-source AI agent harness. It provides an environment for building and running AI agents, with components including models, tools, skills, sessions, sandboxes, storage, scheduling, and user interfaces. The software is distributed under the MIT License. As of August 2026, DeepSeek Harness is available as a developer preview.

=== Plugin architecture ===
DeepSeek Harness uses an "everything-is-a-plugin" design philosophy powered by the Cordis framework. This allows major agent components to be added, removed, or reloaded while the software is running. The modular design enables developers to switch between third-party providers or alternative model configurations without changing the rest of the system.

== Models ==
=== R1 series ===
On 20 January 2025, DeepSeek launched DeepSeek-R1, which was free for iOS and Android. The launch triggered an 18% drop in Nvidia's share price on 27 January. By 27 January, DeepSeek had surpassed ChatGPT as the most downloaded freeware app on the iOS App Store in the United States.

On 28 May 2025, DeepSeek released a minor update, DeepSeek-R1-0528, under the MIT License. Its scores exceeded both DeepSeek R1 (January) and DeepSeek V3-0324 in certain benchmarks.

=== V3 series ===
On 21 August 2025, DeepSeek released DeepSeek V3.1 under the MIT License. This model features a hybrid architecture with thinking and non-thinking modes. It surpassed V3 and R1, by over 40% on benchmarks such as SWE-bench and Terminal-bench. It was updated to V3.1-Terminus on 22 September, fixing multiple language artifacts and improved intelligence.

DeepSeek V3.2-Exp was released on 29 September 2025. It uses DeepSeek Sparse Attention, which is a more efficient attention mechanism. V3.2-Exp was based on DeepSeek V3.1 Terminus. DeepSeek-V3.2 was released on 1 December 2025, alongside DeepSeek-V3.2-Speciale, which was a variant on V3.2 that focused on reasoning.

=== V4 series ===
On 24 April 2026, DeepSeek released a preview of its V4 series, including 284-billion parameter DeepSeek-V4-Flash and 1.6-trillion parameter DeepSeek-V4-Pro. Both featured a one million token context window. V4 was adopted by semiconductor manufacturers such as Huawei and Cambricon Technologies. The full versions of DeepSeek V4-Flash and V4-Pro were released on 31 July and 13 August, respectively.

V4.1-Flash was released on 10 September, offering a different architecture. It used a causal encoder-decoder, while V4 used only a causal decoder. V4.1-Flash had lower memory usage compared to previous versions, according to DeepSeek. It was natively multimodal. On 17 October, DeepSeek released an updated version of V4.1-Flash, named V4.1-Flash-1017, which had increased reinforcement learning training on coding and has better compatibility with DeepSeek Harness.

=== List ===
Major versions of DeepSeek models. SFT stands for supervised finetuning, which allows AI labs to precisely adjust an AI model's behavior.
Major versions	Release date	Status	Major variants	License	Remarks
DeepSeek-Coder	November 2, 2023	Discontinued	Base (pretrained); Instruct (with instruction-finetuned)	Open-weights (DeepSeek)	Uses the same framework as DeepSeek-LLM.
DeepSeek-LLM	November 29, 2023	Discontinued	Base; Chat (with SFT)	Open-weights (DeepSeek)	Uses the same architecture and training algorithm as the original Llama model, with a different learning rate scheduler.
DeepSeek-MoE	January 9, 2024	Discontinued	Base; Chat	Open-weights (DeepSeek)	Developed a variant of MoE.
DeepSeek-Math	April 2024	Discontinued	Base	Open-weights (DeepSeek)	Initialized with DeepSeek-Coder-Base-v1.5
DeepSeek-Math	April 2024	Discontinued	Instruct (with SFT)	Open-weights (DeepSeek)	
DeepSeek-Math	April 2024	Discontinued	RL (using a process reward model)	Open-weights (DeepSeek)	Developed Group Relative Policy Optimization (GRPO), a variant of Proximal Policy Optimization (PPO).
DeepSeek-V2	May 2024	Discontinued	DeepSeek-V2, DeepSeek-V2-Chat; DeepSeek-V2-Lite, DeepSeek-V2-Lite-Chat; DeepSeek-Coder-V2; DeepSeek-V2.5	Open-weights (DeepSeek)	Developed multi-head latent attention (MLA). Also used MoE. Implemented KV caching.
DeepSeek-V3	December 2024	Active	DeepSeek-V3-Base; DeepSeek-V3 (a chat model)	Open-weights (DeepSeek)	The architecture is the same as V2. The training algorithm is the same except with improvements to MoE load balancing and multi-token decoding. Updated on 24 March 2025.
DeepSeek-Prover-V2	May 1, 2025	Active	DeepSeek-Prover-V2-671B; DeepSeek-Prover-V2-7B	Open-weights (DeepSeek)	
DeepSeek-VL2	December 13, 2024	Active		Open-weights (DeepSeek)	
DeepSeek-R1	November 20, 2024	Active	DeepSeek-R1-Lite-Preview	Proprietary	Preview version, only accessed through API and a chat interface.
DeepSeek-R1	January 20, 2025	Active	DeepSeek-R1; DeepSeek-R1-Zero	MIT	Initialized from DeepSeek-V3-Base and sharing the V3 architecture.
DeepSeek-R1	January 20, 2025	Active	Distilled models	MIT	Initialized from other models, such as Llama, Qwen, etc. Distilled from data synthesized by R1 and R1-Zero.
DeepSeek-R1	May 28, 2025	Active	DeepSeek-R1-0528	MIT	
DeepSeek-V3.1	August 21, 2025	Active	DeepSeek-V3.1-Base; DeepSeek-V3.1 (a chat model)	MIT	Hybrid architecture (thinking and non-thinking modes available). Trained on over 800B additional tokens on top of V3.
DeepSeek-V3.1	September 22, 2025	Active	DeepSeek-V3.1-Terminus	MIT	Reducing instances of mixed Chinese-English text and occasional abnormal characters on top of V3.1.
DeepSeek-Math-V2	November 27, 2025	Active		Apache 2.0	
DeepSeek-V3.2	December 1, 2025	Active	DeepSeek-V3.2; DeepSeek-V3.2-Speciale	MIT	
DeepSeek-V4	April 24, 2026	Active	V4-Pro, V4-Flash	MIT	Preview release on 24 April. Official release of V4-Flash on 31 July, and V4-Pro on 13 August
DeepSeek-V4.1	September 10, 2026	Active	V4.1-Flash	MIT	Uses a different architecture than V4. Natively multimodal.
DeepSeek-V4.1-1017	October 17, 2026	Active	V4.1-Flash-1017	MIT	Minor upgrade on V4.1.

== Legal status ==
In the United States, the National Defense Authorization Act for Fiscal Year 2026 instructed the United States Secretary of Defense and the Director of National Intelligence to remove and exclude artificial intelligence developed by DeepSeek or owned by High-Flyer from devices operated by the United States Department of Defense and United States Intelligence Community or their contractors. Artificial intelligence by DeepSeek is allowed only with explicit permissions for research, training, and evaluation or military activities supporting national security functions such as counterterrorism or counterintelligence.

In Australia, the Department of Home Affairs issued a government-wide directive "to prevent the use or installation of DeepSeek products, applications and web services and where found remove all existing instances of DeepSeek products, applications and web services from all Australian Government systems and devices".

== See also ==
- Artificial intelligence industry in China
- List of AI-assisted software development tools
- List of LLMs
- Lists of open-source artificial intelligence software
- Reasoning model – Large language model designed for reasoning tasks
- Six Little Dragons – Informal group of Chinese tech startups
- Zhejiang University – Public university in Hangzhou, Zhejiang, China
