= Financial services in China =

Financial services in China include banks, investment banks, insurance companies, credit card companies, consumer finance companies, government sponsored enterprises, and stock brokerages.

== Securities trading ==
The China Securities Regulatory Commission (CSRC) has required since 2004 that newly appointed CEOs, deputy CEOs, and heads of supervisory boards at locally incorporated securities firms all pass a Chinese language ability examination to take up their posts. In 2007, for example, Goldman Sachs partner Richard Ong was denied permission to take the job of CEO at Beijing joint venture Goldman Sachs Gao Hua Securities Co. because of his weak Chinese language abilities.

== Electronic banking ==
In 1994, China started the "Golden Card Project," enabling cards issued by banks to be used all over the country through a network. The establishment of the China Association of Banks rapidly promoted the interbank card network and by the end of 2004, the inter-region-inter-bank network had reached 600 cities, including all prefecture-level cities and more than 300 economically developed county-level cities.

== International ATMs ==
PRC citizens may apply for an international ATM card corresponding to an interbank network such as Cirrus or PLUS, but foreign residents may not. Foreign residents in PRC, however, may use such interbank networks at ATMs in PRC through ATM cards procured in foreign countries.

Interbank ATMs are common throughout the country, especially in densely populated urban areas such as Beijing.

== See also ==
- China Venture Capital Association
- Economy of China
- History of banking in China
- Chinese financial system
