= Perseverance Asset Management =

Chinese investment management firm

Perseverance Asset Management L.L.P.
- Native name: 上海高毅资产管理合伙企业（有限合伙）
- Company type: Private
- Industry: Investment management
- Founded: May 2013; 13 years ago
- Founder: Qiu Guolu
- Headquarters: Shenzhen, Guangdong China
- Key people: Qiu Guolu (Chairman & CEO); Deng Xiaofeng (CIO)
- Products: Hedge funds
- AUM: US$14 billion (November 2024)
- Number of employees: 160 (2024)
- Website: www.gyasset.com

Perseverance Asset Management (Perseverance; Chinese: 高毅资产; pinyin: Gāoyì Zīchǎn) is a Chinese investment management firm headquartered in Shenzhen.

Perseverance operates one of the largest hedge funds in China and focuses on Greater China public equities.

== Background ==
Perseverance was established in May 2013 by Qiu Guolu. Qiu was the chief investment officer at China Southern Asset Management before leaving in early 2014 to focus on his firm. Qiu spent almost a year building an investment team for Perseverance. Some of the earliest employees that joined the firm were Deng Xiaofeng who was a senior executive at Bosera Asset Management and Feng Liu who had made his fame as an individual investor. Perseverance differs in organization structure where portfolio managers only needed to focus on research and investment with the other duties being shared within the firm. In addition portfolio managers have the freedom to choose stocks without needing only approval from compliance and not the investment committee.

In February 2015, Perseverance launched its first investment product. The firm grew very quickly and by 2020, it had over 100 billion yuan making it one of the largest hedge funds in China.

In November 2020, there were rumours that Perseverance was under investigation and that it had violated rules by reducing its holding with blame put on Feng. Later Feng reposted an exclusive interview with another portfolio manager at Perseverance on his personal Weibo account to indirectly refute the rumors. Perseverance then came out with a statement saying the rumours were untrue and it had already launched a probe to find the source.

In May 2021, it was reported that Perseverance had launched investment products with lock-up periods of 3-years or longer. Perseverance stated some clients were even willing to lock up their money for five to eight years.

In August 2021, it was reported that there was a widely circulated letter from some investors on social media that mocked Qiu. Qiu took a value investing approach that focused on stocks from traditional safe sectors rather than newer green economy stocks like CATL and BYD that were currently trending at the time. Qiu's fund lost 17% that year. The letter stated Qiu should focus on routine administrative operations such as checking the quality of food served to his employees instead of investing in stocks.

In November 2024, Perseverance issued a notice suggesting that investors of investment products managed by Deng should consider redeeming their money. The reason was although the returns were positive, it believed following Donald Trump's victory at the 2024 United States presidential election that there would be a complex environment with uncertainties caused by growing pressure on China's exports and exchange-rate fluctuations. However Perseverance then said it was just a reminder that shouldn't be over-interpreted and it still remained optimistic about the market outlook.

== See also ==
- Greenwoods Asset Management
- Hedge fund industry in China
