= Greenwoods Asset Management =

Chinese investment management firm

Shanghai Greenwoods Asset Management Co. Ltd.
- Native name: 上海景林资产管理公司
- Type: Private
- Industry: Investment management
- Founded: 2004; 22 years ago
- Founder: George Jiang
- Headquarters: Shanghai, China
- Products: Hedge funds Private equity
- AUM: US$20 billion (2023)
- Number of employees: 64 (2024)
- Website: www.greenwoodsasset.com.cn

Greenwoods Asset Management (Greenwoods; Chinese: 景林资产; pinyin: Jǐnglín Zīchǎn) is a Chinese investment management firm headquartered in Shanghai with offices in Singapore and Hong Kong.

Greenwoods operates one of the largest hedge funds in Asia and has also expanded into private equity investing.

== Background ==
Greenwoods was founded in 2004 by George Jiang. Jiang had previous worked as a regulator for the Shenzhen Stock Exchange as well as well as head of asset management for Guosen Securities.

In July 2004, Greenwoods launched its flagship Golden China long/short equity fund to manage money for third party investors. It started with $30 million and invested half its assets B-share companies listed in Shanghai and Shenzhen. Eurekahedge stated in its first year, the fund generated an annualized return of 38%.

In 2005, Greenwoods opened an office in Hong Kong.

In 2010, Greenwoods launched its private equity arm, Greenwoods Investment. It currently manages seven private equity funds.

In August 2014, Greenwoods was the first private Chinese money manager to be awarded a RQFII quota in Hong Kong which allowed it to manage Renminbi portfolios for foreign institutional investors. It was also the first private Chinese money manager to register with foreign regulators which included the U.S. Securities and Exchange Commission and the Securities and Futures Commission.

In 2015, Greenwoods had $5 billion in assets under management with two-thirds coming from foreign institutional investors such as Norges Bank and CPP Investment Board. At this point, the Golden China fund had a cumulative return of 1,496% since inception. In March that year, Greenwoods acquired a stake in mid-size asset manager Chang An Fund Management and became its second largest stakeholder.

In last two months of 2022, the Golden China fund rallied by 45% in response to news that China was in the process of reducing its COVID-19 restrictions and reopening.

In June 2023, Gao Bin who was the head of the private equity arm, Greenwoods Investment was arrested by the authorities for investigation. It was speculated that it related to the probe of Zhu Congjiu who was under investigation for corruption. Gao and Zhu were closely related as both were from Hefei and both had worked for the China Securities Regulatory Commission. Greenwoods subsequently fired Gao and removed his profile from its website. He was replaced by Yang Zhijian. However Gao its still listed in his leaderships role in a dozen of Greenwoods subsidiaries.

Greenwoods takes a value investing approach and claims its strength in stock picking comes from due diligence and local insights in an institutionalized manner. The firm doesn't perform much active marketing for its funds since it states performance is the best form of marketing. At the end of 2014, the Golden China fund had a long bias of 83% which was above the 20% to 70% range it had maintained for the prior three years.

== See also ==
- Perseverance Asset Management
- Hedge fund industry in China
