= Lingjun Investment =

China-based quantitative hedge fund

Ningbo Lingjun Investment Management Partnership
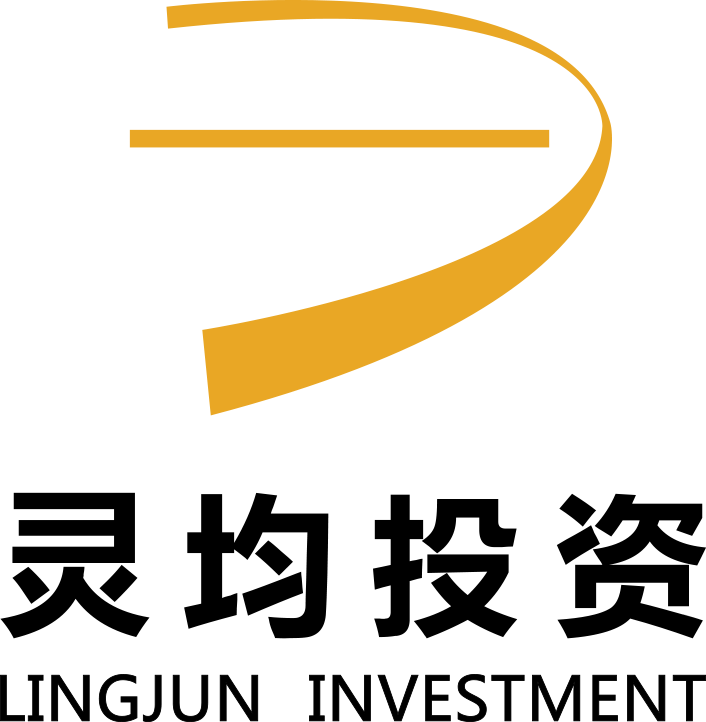
- Native name: 宁波灵均投资管理合伙企业（有限合伙）
- Company type: Private
- Industry: Investment management
- Founded: June 2014; 12 years ago
- Founder: Cai Meijie
- Headquarters: Beijing, China
- Key people: Cai Meijie (Chairperson); Ma Zhiyu (CIO)
- Products: Hedge funds Quantitative finance
- AUM: US$8.3 billion (February 2024)
- Number of employees: 189 (January 2024)
- Website: www.lingjuninvest.com

Lingjun Investment (Lingjun; Chinese: 灵均投资; pinyin: Língjūn Tóuzī) is a hedge fund management firm founded in 2014 that is headquartered in Beijing. It is one of the largest quantitative funds in China.

== Background ==
Lingjun was founded in June 2014 by Cai Meijie who had previously worked at China International Capital Corporation and Penghua Fund Management. Its Chief investment officer, Ma Zhiyu, had previously worked at Millennium Management, LLC. According to the Asset Management Association of China website, the main owner of Lingjun is Cai Jianliang. However, Cai does not hold a position within the firm nor is his profile mentioned. Ma is also another owner via ownership of the investment companies that own Lingjun's equity.

On 20 February 2024, the Shanghai and Shenzhen stock exchanges announced that Linjun was banned from buying and selling shares for three days. This came as a result of Lingjun selling 2.57 billion yuan ($360 million) worth shares within a minute between 9:30 a.m. and 9:31 a.m on the day before. The benchmark indices such as the SSE Composite Index and SZSE Component Index rapidly declined as a result of the trades. A statement from the Shenzhen stock exchange stated Lingjun's selling orders amounted to "abnormal trading behavior" and the firm was already warned multiple times for the same reason.

One day after the announcement, Lingjun issued an apology on its website for the negative impact. It also stated it held a positive long-term market sentiment on Chinese stocks and will review the problems from the transactions. While Lingjun's suspension was not considered a significant problem, it was a further blow to confidence in Chinese quant funds as regulatory scrutiny increased.

Prior to the ban, Lingjun's year-to-date returns from the start of 2024 were poor and had underperformed the CSI 300 Index.

== See also ==
- High-Flyer
- Ubiquant
- Minghong Investment
- Hedge fund industry in China
