= Xinyi Middle School =

- 信宜中学
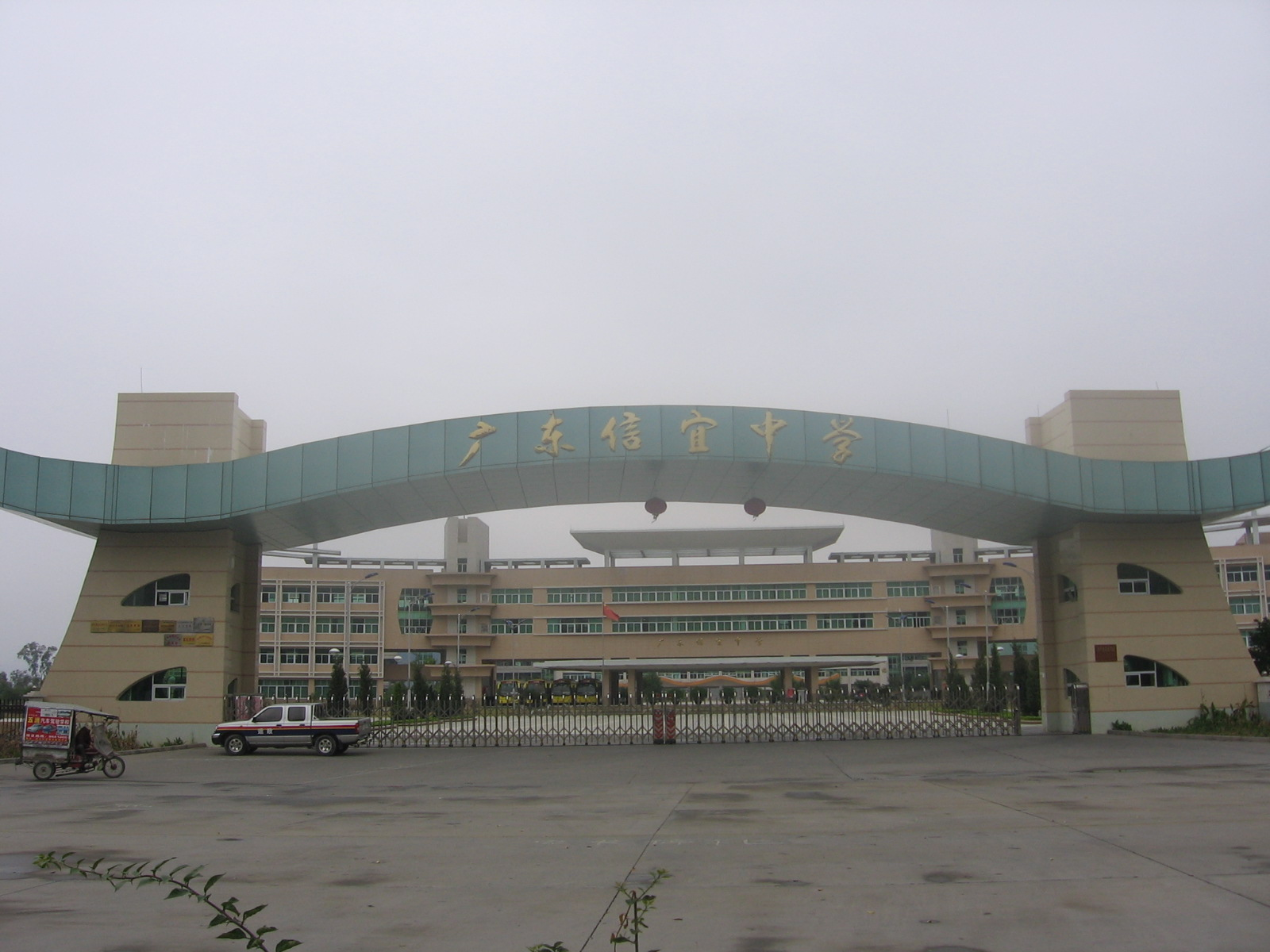
- The Gate of Xinyi Middle School

Location
- Xinyi, Maoming City, Guangdong Province; China
- Coordinates: 22.335931°N 110.948335°E

Information
- Type: K–12
- Established: 1916
- Faculty: 240
- Campus size: 466,200 m^{2} (115.2 acres)

Xinyi Middle School (simplified Chinese: 信宜中学; traditional Chinese: 信宜中學) is located in the south of Xinyi District of Maoming City in Guangdong Province, China. As the first county school in Xinyi District which was set up in 1916, Xinyi Middle School is also the first class school of Guangdong Province as well as Guangdong Province Civilization Unit. In 2007, passing the high school teaching evaluation, Xinyi Middle school became a national-level model high school in Guangdong Province.

== History ==
The school was established in Zhenlong in 1916, and was originally called Zhongyi School. In 1941 it expanded, adding a high school section, and relocated from Zhenlong to Xinyi in 1955. Teaching activities were suspended in 1966 at the start of the Cultural Revolution, resuming again in 1978 after the end of the Cultural Revolution. In 2001 the school moved again, to its current location in Xinyi Education Town.

== Infrastructure ==
Xinyi Middle School covers an area of 466,200 square metres (115.2 acres), of which 125,300 square metres (1,349,000 sq ft) is occupied by structures. Its teaching building is the longest and the largest in China, with a length of 338 metres (1,109 ft) and an area of 36,000 square metres (390,000 sq ft). The teaching building has five storeys, containing 100 classrooms and 10 lecture theaters. All classrooms are equipped with multimedia and high-speed internet infrastructure.
