= Minghong Investment =

China-based quantitative hedge fund

Shanghai Minghong Investment Co., Ltd.
- Native name: 上海明汯投资管理有限公司
- Company type: Private
- Industry: Investment management
- Founded: April 2014; 12 years ago
- Founder: Qiu Huiming
- Headquarters: Shanghai, China
- Key people: Qiu Huiming (CEO)
- Products: Hedge funds Quantitative finance
- AUM: US$7 billion (2024)
- Number of employees: 98 (2024)
- Subsidiaries: Jupiter Research
- Website: www.mhfunds.com

Minghong Investment (Minghong; Chinese: 明汯投资; pinyin: Mínghóng Tóuzī) is a hedge fund management firm founded in 2014 that is headquartered in Shanghai. It is one of the largest quantitative funds in China.

== Background ==
In 2014, Minghong was founded by Qiu Huiming. Qiu holds a PhD in physics from the University of Pennsylvania and had previously worked in the U.S. for firms such as Millennium Management, LLC before returning to China to set up his own firm.

Minghong did not immediately take off and for years was not one of the largest quantitative funds in China.

In 2018, Xie Huanyu joined Minghong as investment director as well as shareholder where he obtained 30% of shares in Minghong. Xie previously worked as a quantitative researcher at Citadel Securities. During 2018, Minghong doubled its assets under management (AUM) after it moved to a medium-to-high frequency statistical arbitrage strategy that boosted excess returns by as much as 20 percentage points annually.

In March 2019, Minghong expanded overseas and opened a firm in Hong Kong named Jupiter Research. Although the name is different, information disclosed to U.S. Securities and Exchange Commission showed Qiu is a key person in charge of the firm as well as the fact that Minghong is affiliated with the firm. The next year, Minghong set up an office in New York City.

In 2020, Minghong quadrupled its AUM from 2018 to become the largest quantitative fund in China. This was done by being the first to sell its products on a large scale through channels of major securities firms and private banks. Minghong became the first quantitative fund in China to have over 100 billion yuan in AUM. At the end of 2020, Minghong changed its shareholder structure so Xie would own 49% of the firm while the rest was owned by Qiu.

In the first quarter of 2021, Minghong reported a performance loss of 27%. This led to the largest redemption in its history up to that point where investors withdrew almost 20% of its AUM. The losses were attributed to mostly to a "medium-level" exposure to so-called style risk factors such as growth and momentum in Minghong's computer models which would be adjusted later. In March that year Minghong apologized to clients for the losses and in April stated it had managed to stem the losses. Due to the losses, Minghong was no longer the largest quantitative fund in China.

In Match 2022, China's stock market plunged as part of the 2022 stock market decline. During that period Minghong added 400 million yuan ($63 million) of stock exposure to its multi strategy fund on 15 March.

On 29 September 2023, the Asset Management Association of China barred Minghong from registering new products for three months. This came after the China Securities Regulatory Commission repreminded Minghong due to two of its employees writing negative comments on its peers on social media. Minghong stated it did not authorize the employees' actions that that it would improve internal controls.

In April 2024, it was reported that Minghong was preparing strategies that targeted Japan and India. This came at a time where quantiative funds were planning to expand overseas after regulators cracked down on quantitative funds in China.

== See also ==
- High-Flyer
- Ubiquant
- Lingjun Investment
- Hedge fund industry in China
