= Zhusha, Xinyi =

Zhusha Town 朱砂镇
- Town
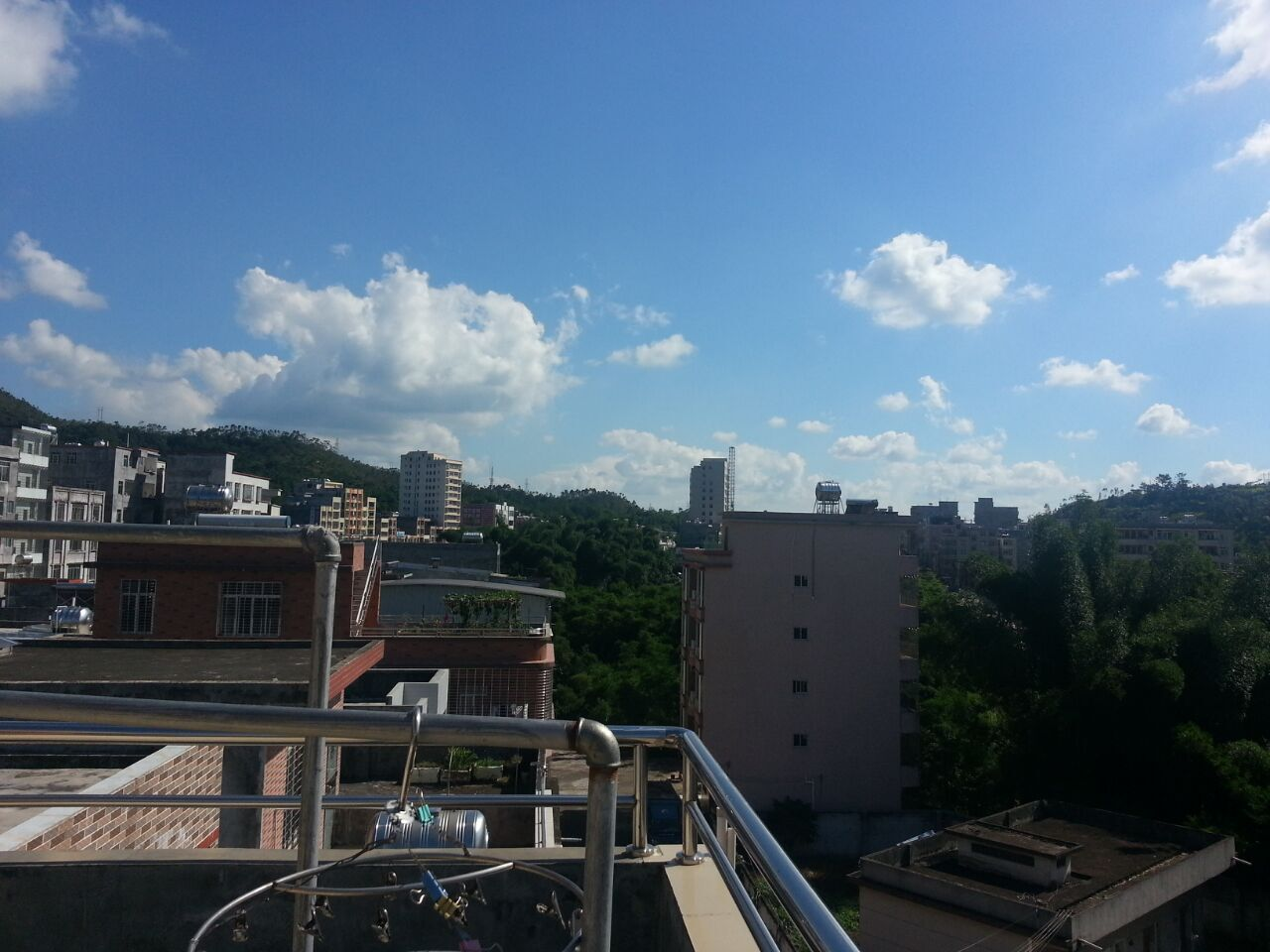

- Location in Guangdong
- Coordinates: 22°33′N 110°56′E
- Country: China
- Province: Guangdong
- County-level city: Xinyi

Area
  - Total: 282 km^{2} (109 sq mi)

Population
  - Total: 90,000
- Demonym: Cantonese
- Time zone: UTC+8 (China Standard)
- Postal code: 525357
- Area code: + 86 0668

Zhusha (Chinese: 朱砂; pinyin: Zhūshā) is a town in the northwest of Xinyi city, Guangdong province, China, which is located in 22°33′N 110°56′E. In 2003 the original Zhusha has been merged with two other cities: Ane and Wangsha, with a total area of 282 square kilometers and a population of over 90,000. It is the biggest town in Xinyi city.

== History ==
Zhusha got its name because of the Vermilion Ridge (also named Rouge Hill in ancient times). It first belonged to Liangde county (梁德县) during Liang, Chen, Sui dynasty, then belonged to Huaide county (怀德县) during Tang, five dynasties and Song dynasty, later it belonged to the middle road of Xinyi County (信宜县) during the last of Song and Yuan dynasty, and then named as Xinfengdu (信丰都) belonged to Xining county (西宁县) during Ming dynasty. It was renamed as Dasheng castle (大胜堡) belonged to Xinyi County (信宜县) at the beginning of the Qing dynasty, and renamed as Xinyi County sixth area Zhusha village (信宜县六区朱砂乡) in 1932, and then renamed again as the Third victory county (三区大胜乡) in 1940.

In December 1952, it was named as the Sixth district of Xinyi County (信宜县第六区), and in February 1957 named as Zhuasha county (朱砂乡); and in the autumn of 1958, the Zhusha People's commune (朱砂人民公社) was established and in June 1961, named as Zhusha district (朱砂区).

However, it was renamed as Zhusha People's commune (朱砂人民公社) again in January 1963, and then renamed back as Zhusha district (朱砂区) in December 1983; and then in the winter of 1986, formed as Zhusha Town (朱砂镇). On November 26, 2003, it was merged with Ane (安莪) and Wangsha (旺沙) to be the Zhusha Town now.

== Administration ==
Administratively, Zhusha Town is under the jurisdiction of Xinyi. This town consists of three parts, including Zhusha, Wangsha and Ane. It administers 32 village-level divisions.

Name	Simplified Chinese	Location in Zhusha	Registered family	Population (2000 census)	Area (km^{2})	Arable area (acre)
Longbu village	龙埠村	South	708	2812	6.68	1276
Butou village	埠头村	South	767	2930	6.05	1486
Shigen village	石根村	North	678	2556	6.07	1058
Xilan village	溪兰村	Middle	715	2888	8.31	1286
Huashan village	华山村	West	430	1493	6.19	892
Sannan village	三南村	South	495	1796	4.51	973
Liucun village	柳村村	Southwest	551	1939	5.61	1353
Wenhua village	文华村	Northeast	667	2549	7.57	1243
Yanhe village	燕贺村	Northeast	839	2894	8.98	1413
Panlong village	盘龙村	East	616	2229	9.34	1132
Yanshui village	燕水村	South	415	1651	5.29	891
Zhusha village	朱砂村	Middle	1572	5849	12.28	2354
Pingzhai village	平寨村	North	458	1765	3.54	773
Shuangdi village	双砥村	Middle	1107	4442	10.99	2313
Gupan village	古泮村	Southeast	403	1542	4.96	756
Liantang village	莲塘村	Middle	1457	5508	16.52	2039
Yanchong village	燕冲村	Northeast	574	1915	8.39	1014
Wangsha village	旺沙村	Northeast	969	2839	8.96	1288
Shiyin village	石印村	Southwest	673	2549	8.9	1634
Daliu village	大六村	Southwest	1094	4027	8.76	2124
Wenliao village	文料村	West	1021	3863	9.77	2271
Guling village	古令村	West	663	2459	7.17	1385
Wangke village	旺科村	North	511	2011	7.28	1405
Padong village	琶垌村	West	1007	3484	10.9	1710
Liwu village	里五村	South	1253	4907	11.38	2068
Foshui village	佛水村	East	575	2045	10.23	1263
Linwo village	林渥村	East	1196	3923	14.46	1878
Jiatang village	加塘村	Northeast	666	2332	8.76	1233
Luolin village	罗林村	Southeast	782	2825	13.46	1298
Xinxu village	新圩村	East	647	2192	7.15	1044
Baitu village	白土村	Northwest	843	3504	16.91	2310

== Geography ==
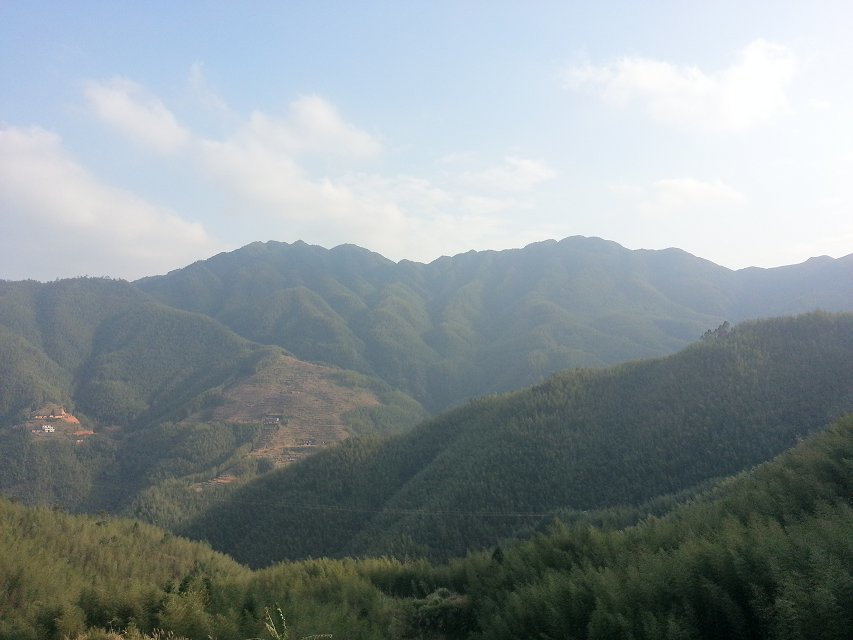
The landscape of Zhusha

=== Political geography ===
Zhusha Town is located in the north of the Xinyi city, 29 km from the urban area. It is bordered by Guizi Town and Chashan Town in the east, connected to Huaixiang Town and Chidong Town in the South, next to the Jindong Town in West, and adjacent to with Cenxi city, Guangxi province in the north.

=== Landscape and climate ===
Zhusha has a subtropical climate with the average annual temperature over 20°C and the average annual precipitation about 1800 mm. The landscape of Zhusha Town is mainly hills. It has rich mineral resources, including kaolin, granite, mica, gold, silver, copper, iron, manganese, limestone and so on. The land area of the whole town is about 119,850 acres, of which 41,522 acres are arable.

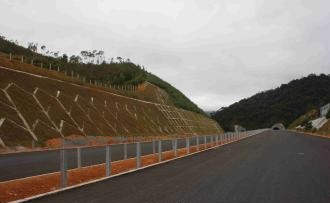
Baotou–Maoming Expressway

== Transportation ==
- China National Highway 207
- G65 Baotou–Maoming Expressway
- Luoyang–Zhanjiang Railway

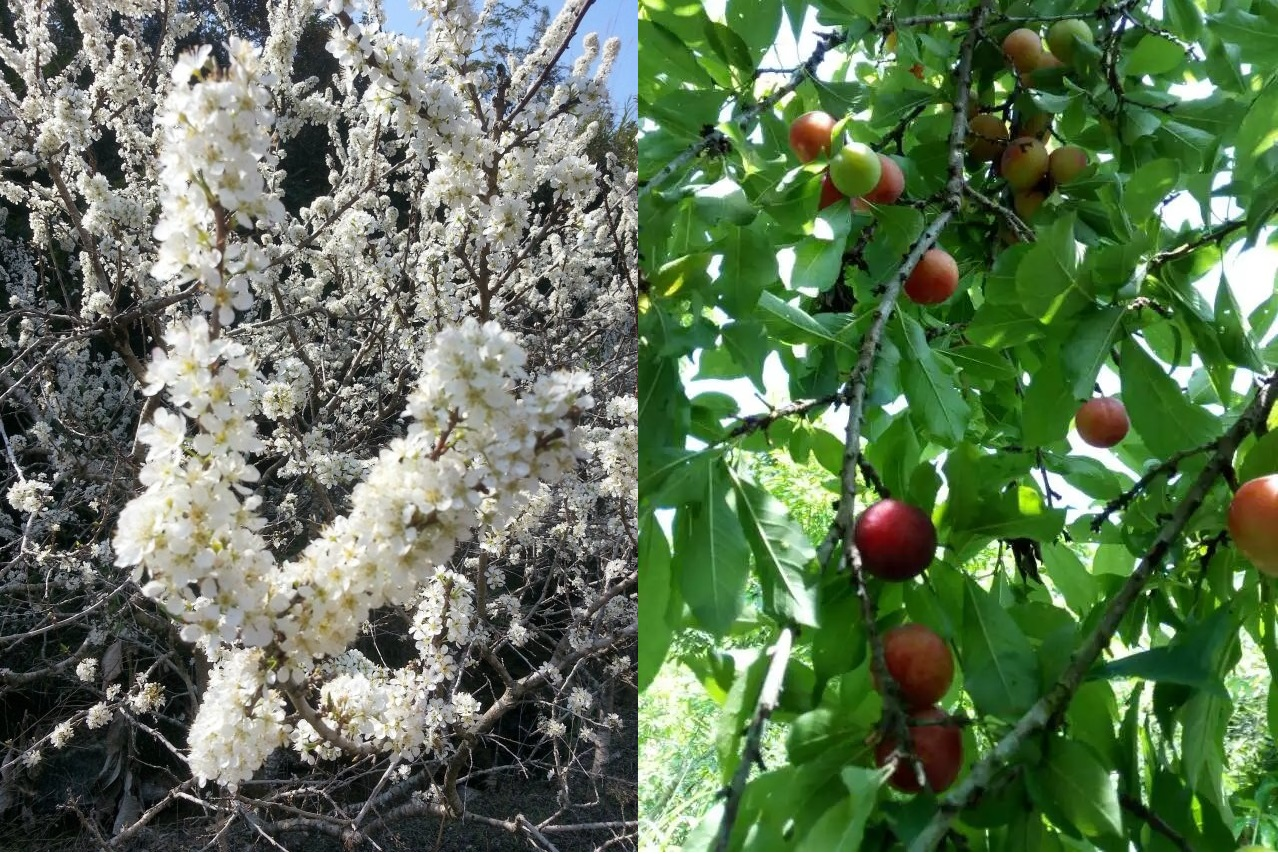
Plums of Zhusha

== Economy ==
In 2010, the industrial output of the whole town was more than 2 billion RMB. There were 2,158 self-employment industrial, 62 legal entities registered companies in the whole town. On the other hand, Zhusha Town is rich in mineral resources and water resources, including 19 hydroelectric stations at present, the total generating capacity over 50 million degrees in 2010. Its industrial type are mainly ethylene follow-up processing, ceramics and weaving and the agriculture are mainly rice, maize, cinnamon and plums.

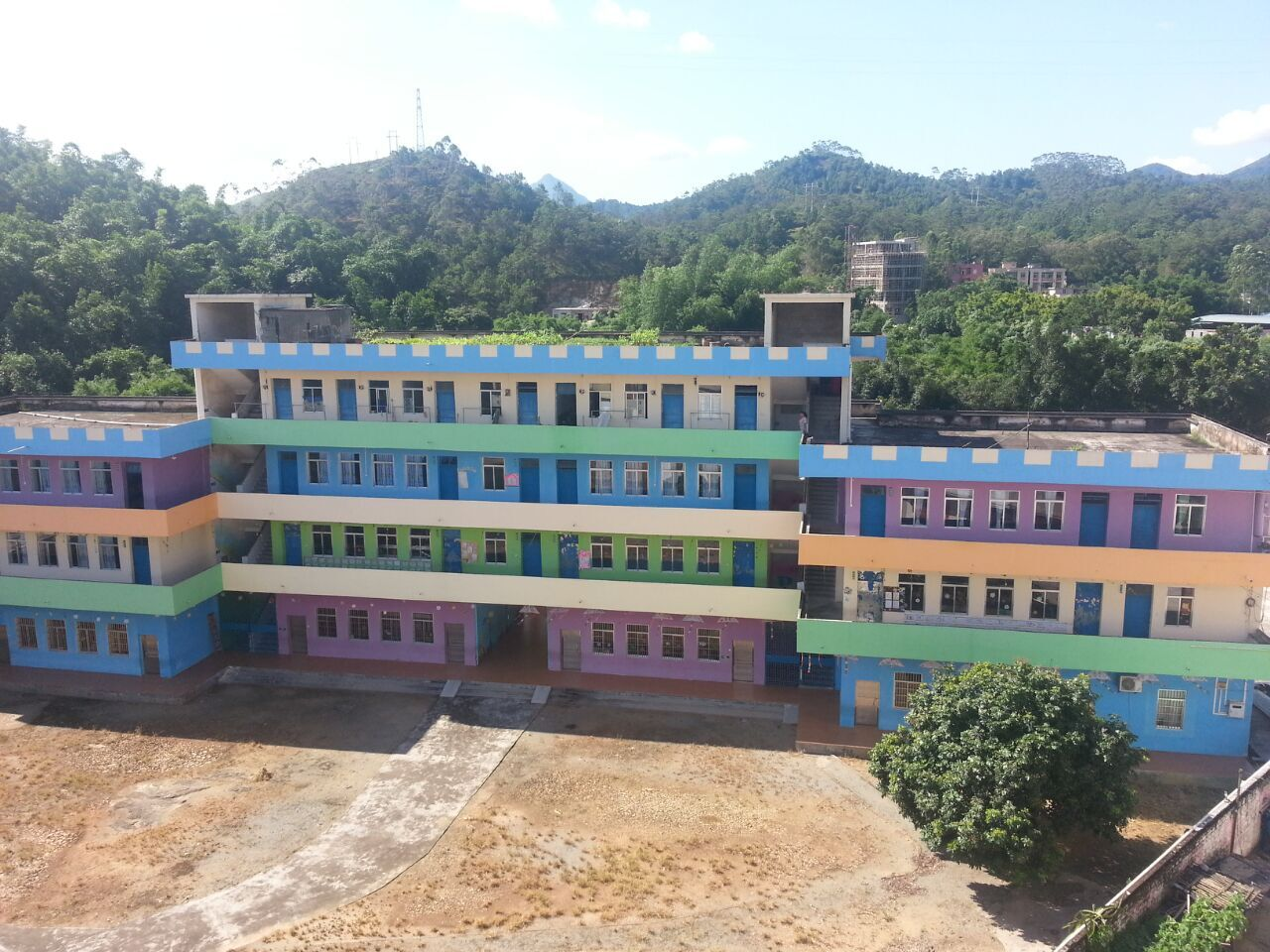
Zhongxin Kindergarten in Zhusha.

== Education ==
There are one middle school, 15 elementary schools, 5 kindergartens in Zhusha Town.

== Culture ==
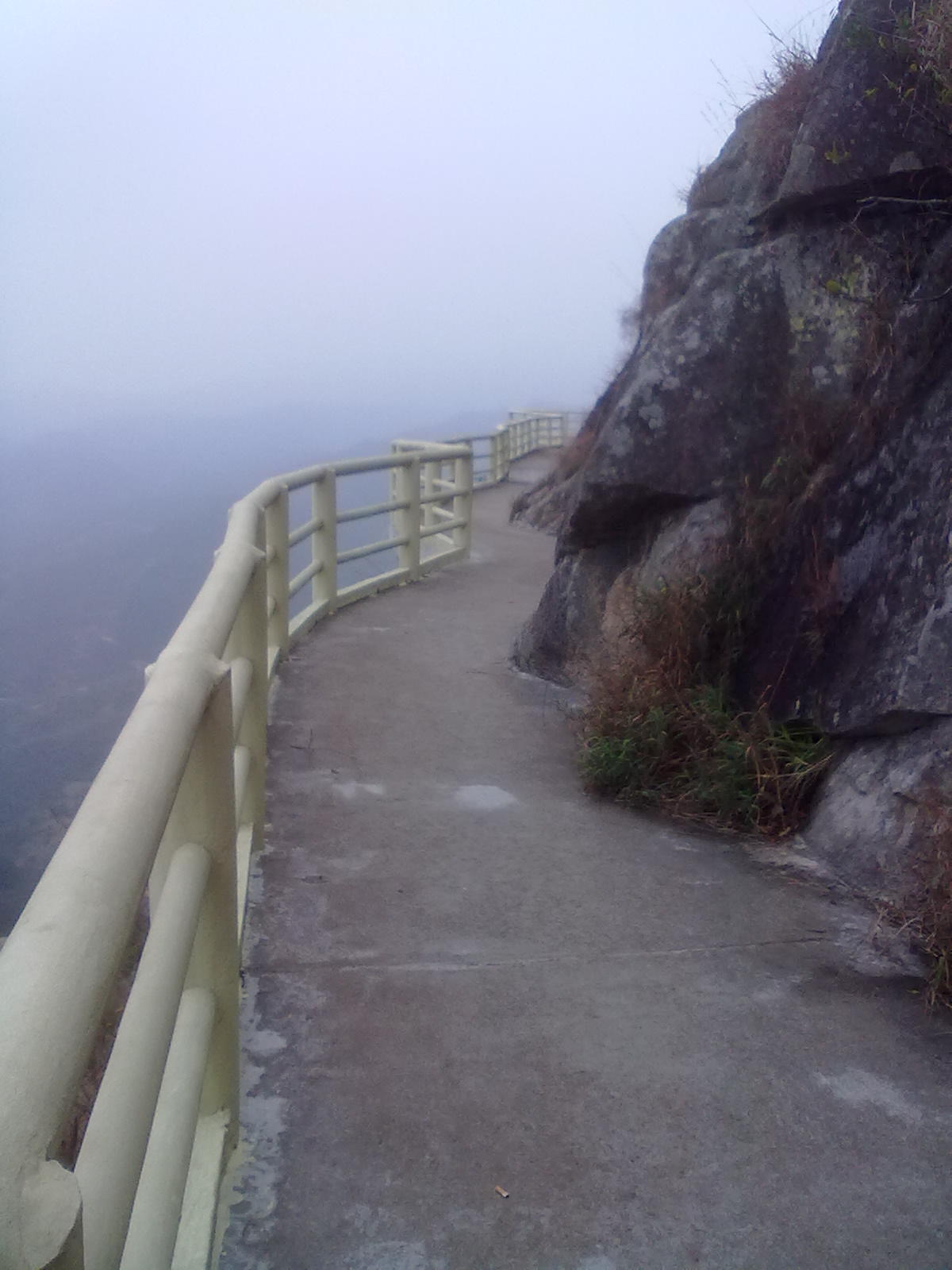
Shigen Mountain

Shigen Mountain (石根山) is the most famous mountain in Zhusha Town with the height of 990 meters above sea level. It is the border along Guangdong and Guangxi province. The whole Zhusha town can be seen on the top of Shigen Mountain. There is concrete plank road built on the cliffs of the mid-levels.

Lotus Temple (莲花祠) is located in the Liantang village of Zhusha Town with an area of 339.2 square meters. The temple was built with wood on a circular mound in Kangxi 61 years (1722) and got its name because it looks like a lotus flower. It is full of various murals, reliefs, wood carvings and there is a pond in front of the temple.
