= Liang Wenfeng =

Chinese businessman (born 1985)

- 梁文锋
- Born: 1985 (age 40–41); Wuchuan, Guangdong, China
- Education: Zhejiang University (BEng, MEng)
- Known for: Co-founder of High-Flyer; Founder and CEO of DeepSeek
- Scientific career
- Fields: Information engineering
- Thesis: Study on object tracking algorithm based on low-cost PTZ camera (2010)
- Academic advisors: Xiang Zhiyu (项志宇)

Chinese name
- Simplified Chinese: 梁文锋
- Traditional Chinese: 梁文鋒
Transcriptions
Standard Mandarin
- Hanyu Pinyin: Liáng Wénfēng
Yue: Cantonese
- Jyutping: Loeng4 Man4-fung1

Liang Wenfeng (Chinese: 梁文锋; pinyin: Liáng Wénfēng; born 1985) is a Chinese entrepreneur and businessman who is the co-founder of the quantitative hedge fund High-Flyer, as well as the founder and CEO of its artificial intelligence company DeepSeek.

Liang attended Zhejiang University, and began his career by applying machine learning methods to quantitative finance. Through High-Flyer, he built large-scale computing infrastructure that was later used to support artificial intelligence research, leading to the creation of DeepSeek in 2023. DeepSeek gained international attention following the release of DeepSeek-R1, which analysts described as demonstrating high-level performance with comparatively limited compute resources.

In 2025, Liang was named to Time magazine's list of 100 Most Influential People in AI and Fortune's list of the Most Powerful People in Business.

In July 2026, Bloomberg News reported that Liang had become the world's wealthiest founder of an AI-model company, with a net worth of $36 billion, according to the Bloomberg Billionaires Index.

== Early life ==
Liang was born in 1985 in the village of Mililing (米历岭村), Qinba town (覃巴镇), Wuchuan, Guangdong. His parents were both primary school teachers. Liang was routinely praised by both locals and teachers alike. Even since middle school, Liang was recalled for being well-known for reading comic books, while also being very proficient in mathematics.

== Education ==
After elementary school, Liang attended Wuchuan No. 1 Middle School. There, he quickly excelled in class and ranked highly amongst his peers. He taught himself high school and university-level mathematics courses.

Liang then attended Wuchaun No. 1 High School. In these years, he developed hobbies of mathematical modeling and conducting research projects. Compared to his peers, he was always ranked highly. For every mathematics exam, he always ranked within the top three. He was also the top scorer in the Zhanjiang region of Guangdong for the college entrance exam. With a score of 806, he met the admission requirements for Tsinghua University but ultimately chose to attend Zhejiang University due to the major offered. Thus, in 2002, Liang left high school early to further pursue his education at the university level at the young age of 17.

Attending university at the age of 17, Liang earned a Bachelor of Engineering in Electronic Information Engineering in 2007 and his Master of Engineering in Information & Communication Engineering in 2010. His master's dissertation was titled "Study on Object Tracking Algorithm Based on Low-Cost PTZ camera" (基于低成本PTZ摄像机的目标跟踪算法研究).

In his college years, DJI founder Wang Tao asked Liang to join as a co-founder. Liang declined the invitation to pursue artificial intelligence methodologies in financial markets. While he states that those around him had entrepreneurial mindsets, he himself valued academics.

== Career ==
=== Early career (2008–2016) ===
During the 2008 financial crisis, Liang formed a team with his classmates to accumulate data related to financial markets. He also led the team to explore quantitative trading using machine learning and other technologies.

After his graduation, Liang moved to a cheap flat in Chengdu, Sichuan, where he experimented with ways to apply AI to various fields. These ventures failed, until he tried applying AI to finance.

In 2013, Liang attempted to integrate artificial intelligence with quantitative trading and founded Hangzhou Yakebi Investment Management Co Ltd with Xu Jin, an alumnus of Zhejiang University. In 2015, they co-founded Hangzhou Huanfang Technology Co Ltd, which is today's Zhejiang Jiuzhang Asset Management Co Ltd.

=== High-Flyer (2016–2023) ===
In February 2016, Liang and two other engineering classmates co-founded Ningbo High-Flyer Quantitative Investment Management Partnership (Limited Partnership). The team relied on mathematics and AI to make investments. Much of the early startup culture was described by former employees to be "geeky" and "quirky," often seen as contrary to the existing culture in large Chinese tech companies.

In 2019, Liang founded High-Flyer AI which was dedicated to research on AI algorithms and its basic applications. By this time, High-Flyer had over 10 billion yuan in assets under management.

On 30 August 2019, Liang Wenfeng delivered a keynote speech entitled "The Future of Quantitative Investment in China from a Programmer's Perspective" at the Private Equity Golden Bull Award ceremony held by China Securities Journal, and sparked heated discussions. Liang stated that the criterion for determining what is quantitative or non-quantitative is whether the investment decision is made by quantitative methods or by people. Quantitative funds do not have portfolio managers making the decisions and instead are just servers. He also stated High-Flyer's mission is to improve the effectiveness of China's secondary market.

In February 2021, Gregory Zuckerman's book The Man Who Solved the Market: How Jim Simons Launched the Quant Revolution was published. Liang wrote the preface for the Chinese edition of the book where he stated that whenever he encountered difficulties at work, he would think of Simons' words "There must be a way to model prices". In January 2025, Zuckerman wrote in The Wall Street Journal where he acknowledged this fact and stated he has been trying to get in touch with Liang but much like Simons, Liang is very secretive and difficult to contact.

During 2021, Liang started buying thousands of Nvidia GPUs for his AI side project while running High-Flyer. Liang wanted to build something and it will be a game changer which his business partners thought was only possible from giants such as ByteDance and Alibaba Group.

=== DeepSeek (since 2023) ===
==== DeepSeek begins ====
In May 2023, Liang announced High-Flyer would pursue the development of artificial general intelligence and launched DeepSeek. During that month in an interview with 36Kr, Liang stated that High-Flyer had acquired 10,000 Nvidia A100 GPUs before the US government imposed AI chip restrictions on China. That laid the foundation for DeepSeek to operate as an LLM developer.

Liang also stated DeepSeek gets funding from High-Flyer. Liang only personally holds 1% of the company, with 99% of the company being held by Ningbo High-Flyer Quantitative Investment Management Partnership (Limited Partnership). With DeepSeek's funding model, it lacks commercial pressure and rigid key performance indicators, enabling the company to deviate from previously established model architectures.

==== Early development ====
In July 2024, Liang was interviewed again by 36Kr. He stated that when DeepSeek-V2 was released and triggered an AI price war in China, it came as a huge surprise as the team did not expect pricing to be so sensitive. Liang's aggressive pricing of the language model forced domestic tech giants including Alibaba and Baidu to cut their own rates by over 95%. He also stated that as China's economy develops, it should gradually become a contributor instead of freeriding. What is lacking in China's innovation is not capital but a lack of confidence and knowledge on organizing talent into it. DeepSeek has not hired anyone particularly special and employees tend to be locally educated. When it comes to disruptive technologies, closed source approaches can only temporarily delay others in catching up.

As the goal was long-term, DeepSeek sought employees who had ability and passion rather than experience. To retain a high talent density relative to larger firms like Bytedance or Baidu, DeepSeek aimed to maintain a low-hierarchy corporate culture, with members working in project-based groups, as well as competitive compensation. Liang emphasized his vision for DeepSeek employees to bring their "unique experience and ideas" instead of needing to be explicitly directed, with an overall bottom-up approach to division of labor. Liang noted that a significant outcome of this approach was the multi-head latent attention training architecture, which was attributed directly to a young DeepSeek researcher's personal interest. This advancement played a core role in reducing the cost of training the DeepSeek-V3 model, released in December 2024.

== Reception and impact ==
On 20 January 2025, Liang was invited to the Symposium with Experts, Entrepreneurs and Representatives from the Fields of Education, Science, Culture, Health and Sports (专家、企业家和教科文卫体等领域代表座谈会) hosted by Chinese Premier Li Qiang in Beijing. Liang, being considered as an industry expert, was asked to provide opinions and suggestions on a draft for comments of the annual 2024 government work report.

On 17 February 2025, Liang, along with heads of several top-level Chinese private-sector companies, was invited to the Symposium with Private-Sector Enterprises (民营企业座谈会) hosted by General Secretary of the Chinese Communist Party Xi Jinping at the Great Hall of the People in Beijing.

== Recognition ==
In August 2025, Liang was recognized by Time magazine on its list of 100 Most Influential People in AI. In the same month, he was named on Fortune's 100 Most Powerful People in Business. In November 2025, after a reported net worth of $11 billion, he was added to China's 100 richest list.
