= Ubiquant =

China-based quantitative hedge fund

Ubiquant Investment (Beijing) Corp, Ltd.
- Native name: 九坤投资（北京）有限公司
- Company type: Private
- Industry: Investment management
- Founded: April 2012; 14 years ago
- Founders: Wang Chen; Yao Qicong
- Headquarters: Beijing, China
- Products: Hedge funds Quantitative finance
- AUM: US$7.5 billion (2024)
- Number of employees: 167 (2024)
- Website: ubiquant.com

Ubiquant (Chinese: 九坤; pinyin: Jiǔ Kūn) is a Beijing-based hedge fund management firm founded in 2012. It is one of the largest quantitative funds in China.

== Background ==
Ubiquant was founded in 2012 by Wang Chen and Yao Qicong, former WorldQuant researchers. When Ubiquant first started it was mainly a self-operated commodity trading advisor.

In 2014, Ubiquant completed its registration with the Asset Management Association of China.

In 2016, Ubiquant launched its full asset management business which featured a wider product line including enhanced indexing and quantitative long/short equity strategies.

In 2018, Ubiquant started moving toward using artificial intelligence (AI) methods under big data to drive transactions.

From 2019 to early 2020, Ubiquant established its own AI laboratory called AI LAB and built a technical team to research the use of AI to come up with new trading strategies and products. It has also built a data laboratory.

In November 2021, a SFC regulated subsidiary named Ubiquant Asset Management Co., Limited was established in Hong Kong.

In January 2022, the Ubiquant Asia Pacific Quantitative Hedge Fund fell 39% although it rebounded with more than a 20% gain in February.

In April 2024, it was reported that Ubiquant planned to open a U.S office. This came after Chinese regulators were tightening rules for quantitative funds in China.

== Corporate affairs ==
According to Bloomberg News, Ubiquant has offered annual salaries of up to $300,000 to attract recent graduates from the fields of artificial intelligence and computer science. Ubiquant has offered more experienced candidates annual salaries of $1 million. Extra incentives are given such as one time bonuses or profit sharing from trading strategies. The hiring process is vigorous and selective where candidates are tested on many areas such as coding and statistics and their academic research papers are also examined. In 2020, ten fresh graduates were hired by the firm.

Ubiquant is stationed near Tsinghua University. It has additional offices in Shanghai and Shenzhen which were established in 2017 and 2020 respectively.

== See also ==
- High-Flyer
- Lingjun Investment
- Minghong Investment
- Hedge fund industry in China
