= Xinyi, Guangdong =

Xinyi 信宜市 Sunyi; Hsini
- County-level city
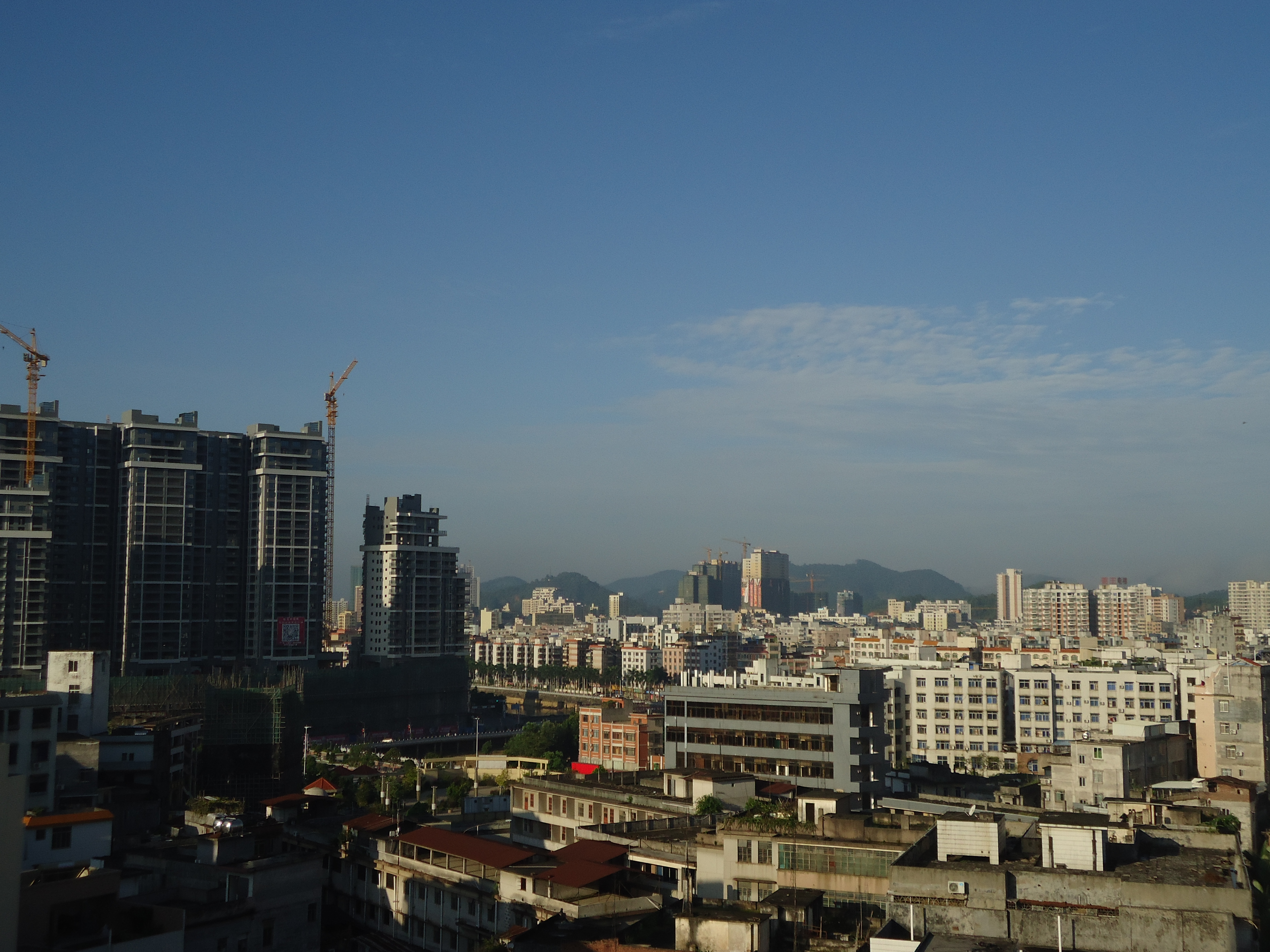

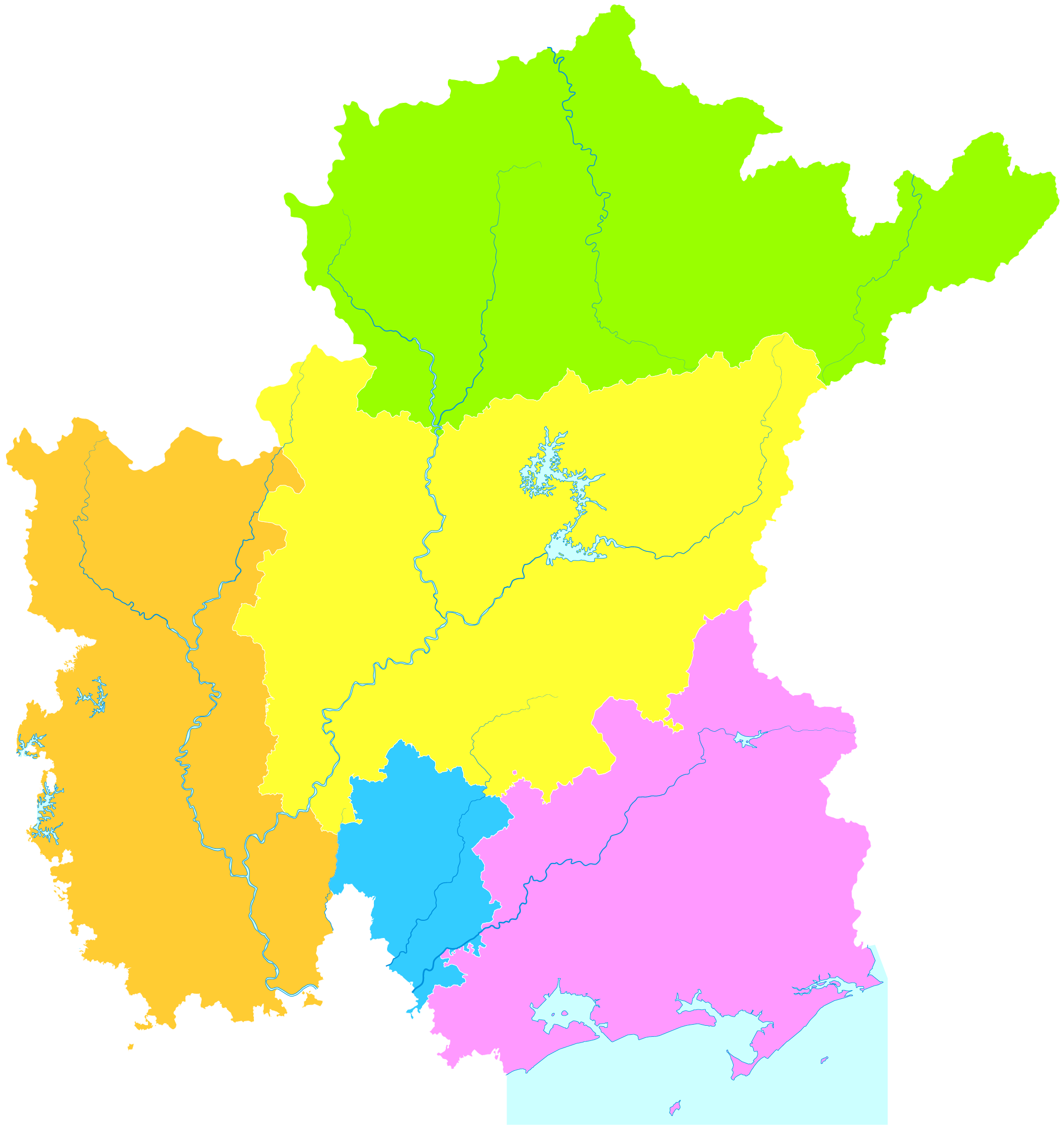
- Xinyi is the northernmost division on this map of Maoming

- Location in Guangdong
- Coordinates: 22°21′18″N 110°56′48″E
- Country: People's Republic of China
- Province: Guangdong
- Prefecture-level city: Maoming

Area
  - County-level city: 3,081 km^{2} (1,190 sq mi)
  - Metro: 3,081 km^{2} (1,190 sq mi)

Population (2020 census)
  - County-level city: 1,014,577
  - Density: 329.3/km^{2} (852.9/sq mi)
  - Metro: 1,014,577
  - Metro density: 329.3/km^{2} (852.9/sq mi)
- Time zone: UTC+8 (China Standard)
- Postal code: 525300
- Area code: (0)668
- License plate prefixes: 粤K
- Website: www.xinyi.gov.cn

Xinyi
- Simplified Chinese: 信宜
- Postal: Sunyi
Transcriptions
Standard Mandarin
- Hanyu Pinyin: Xìnyí
- Wade–Giles: Hsin-i

Xinyi, previously romanized as Sunyi (Note: Xinyi was also formerly romanized Sin-e.) (Jyutping: seon3 ji4), is a county-level city in Guangdong Province, China. It is administered as part of the prefecture-level city of Maoming in the southwestern corner of the province, bordering Guangxi to the west. As of the 2020 census, it had a population of 1,014,577 people. Though its metro area is much smaller with 418,731 inhabitants considered urban.

== History ==
Under the Qing, Xinyi County formed part of the prefecture of Gaozhou. After the Chinese Civil War, it was reorganized under Maoming. Xinyi is the ancestral hometown of around 500, 000 Chinese diaspora, ninety percent of them settle in Malaysia.

== Transportation ==
- China National Highway 207

== Schools ==
Xinyi Middle School, the first county school in Xinyi District, was set up in 1916. It is now a national-level model high school.

== Districts ==
- Zhusha

== Climate ==
Climate data for Xinyi, elevation 141 m (463 ft), (1991–2020 normals, extremes 1957–present)
Month	Jan	Feb	Mar	Apr	May	Jun	Jul	Aug	Sep	Oct	Nov	Dec	Year
Record high °C (°F)	29.0 (84.2)	33.3 (91.9)	34.9 (94.8)	35.0 (95.0)	36.3 (97.3)	38.3 (100.9)	38.9 (102.0)	37.6 (99.7)	37.5 (99.5)	36.2 (97.2)	34.4 (93.9)	30.4 (86.7)	38.9 (102.0)
Mean daily maximum °C (°F)	20.2 (68.4)	21.6 (70.9)	24.3 (75.7)	28.0 (82.4)	31.2 (88.2)	32.5 (90.5)	33.2 (91.8)	33.2 (91.8)	32.4 (90.3)	30.1 (86.2)	26.7 (80.1)	22.2 (72.0)	28.0 (82.4)
Daily mean °C (°F)	15.2 (59.4)	16.8 (62.2)	19.8 (67.6)	23.6 (74.5)	26.4 (79.5)	27.7 (81.9)	28.3 (82.9)	28.1 (82.6)	27.2 (81.0)	24.9 (76.8)	21.1 (70.0)	16.8 (62.2)	23.0 (73.4)
Mean daily minimum °C (°F)	11.8 (53.2)	13.6 (56.5)	16.7 (62.1)	20.5 (68.9)	23.3 (73.9)	24.9 (76.8)	25.2 (77.4)	25.0 (77.0)	24.0 (75.2)	21.3 (70.3)	17.4 (63.3)	13.2 (55.8)	19.7 (67.5)
Record low °C (°F)	2.0 (35.6)	0.5 (32.9)	3.9 (39.0)	9.2 (48.6)	14.8 (58.6)	17.9 (64.2)	21.2 (70.2)	21.8 (71.2)	15.8 (60.4)	10.9 (51.6)	4.4 (39.9)	1.9 (35.4)	0.5 (32.9)
Average precipitation mm (inches)	42.9 (1.69)	42.0 (1.65)	71.4 (2.81)	193.3 (7.61)	302.6 (11.91)	344.1 (13.55)	276.1 (10.87)	253.1 (9.96)	141.9 (5.59)	58.3 (2.30)	41.9 (1.65)	33.0 (1.30)	1,800.6 (70.89)
Average precipitation days (≥ 0.1 mm)	7.8	8.7	11.7	14.0	18.9	20.4	18.0	19.0	13.9	6.2	6.2	5.8	150.6
Average relative humidity (%)	72	76	79	80	81	83	81	82	78	69	68	66	76
Mean monthly sunshine hours	115.4	88.2	77.3	99.7	152.5	155.3	195.3	191.5	190.5	212.2	176.6	155.8	1,810.3
Percentage possible sunshine	34	27	21	26	37	39	48	48	52	59	54	47	41
Source: China Meteorological Administrationall-time record lowall-time October record

Facts of overseas Chinese: Xinyi is the hometown of around 200,000 overseas Chinese. These overseas Chinese are mostly settled in Malaysia and Singapore .
