= China Venture Capital and Private Equity Association =

China Venture Capital and Private Equity Association (CVCA) is a Venture Capital industry trade group that itself says "promotes the interest and the development of venture capital ("VC") and private equity ("PE") industry in the Greater China Region."

CVCA was founded in mid-2002 and is based in Beijing.

== Members ==
As of 2008, CVCA has more than 150 member firms, which altogether manage over US$100 billion in venture capital and private equity funds. CVCA's member firms have experience in PE and VC investing worldwide and have made many investments in a variety of industries in China, including IT, telecoms, business services, media and entertainment, biotech, consumer products, general manufacturing and others.

== Mission ==
CVCA's mission is:

to foster the understanding of the importance of venture capital and private equity to the vitality of the Greater China economy and global economies; to promote government policies conducive to the development of VC and PE industry; to promote and maintain high ethical and professional standards; to facilitate networking and knowledge sharing opportunities among members; and to provide research data, industry publications and professional development for PE and VC investors.CVCA is incorporated in Hong Kong with a representative office in Beijing and Shanghai.

== Funding ==
Funding for CVCA comes from membership payment. Membership for CVCA is open to all China-focused VC and PE firms and corporate investors, and is also open to the related professional companies, which can join as CVCA associate members.

== See also ==
- Hedge fund industry in China
