= High-Flyer =

Chinese quantitative hedge fund and AI company

Ningbo High-Flyer Quantitative Investment Management Partnership (Limited Partnership)
- Native name: 宁波幻方量化投资管理合伙企业（有限合伙）
- Type: Private
- Industry: Hedge fund Artificial intelligence
- Founded: February 2016; 10 years ago
- Founders: Liang Wenfeng; Xu Jin; Zheng Dawei
- Headquarters: Hangzhou, Zhejiang, China
- Key people: Lu Zhengzhe (CEO)
- AUM: US$10 billion (December 2025)
- Number of employees: 160 (2021)
- Subsidiaries: DeepSeek
- Website: high-flyer.cn

Ningbo High-Flyer Quantitative Investment Management Partnership (Limited Partnership), (Note: Chinese: 宁波幻方量化投资管理合伙企业（有限合伙）) doing business as High-Flyer, (Note: Chinese: 幻方; pinyin: Huàn Fāng) is a Chinese hedge fund company incorporated in February 2016. Its legal registration address is in Ningbo, Zhejiang, and its main office location is in Hangzhou, Zhejiang. It is the founder and backer of AI firm DeepSeek.

== History ==
High-Flyer was founded in February 2016 by Liang Wenfeng and two of his classmates from Zhejiang University. They generated ideas of algorithmic trading as students during the 2008 financial crisis. The company has two AMAC regulated subsidiaries, Zhejiang High-Flyer Asset Management Co., Ltd. and Ningbo High-Flyer Quant Investment Management Partnership LLP which were established in 2015 and 2016 respectively. The two subsidiaries have over 450 investment products.

In 2016, High-Flyer experimented with a multi-factor price-volume based model to take stock positions, began testing in trading the following year and then more broadly adopted machine learning-based strategies.

In 2019, High-Flyer set up a SFC-regulated subsidiary in Hong Kong named High-Flyer Capital Management (Hong Kong) Limited. It was approved as a Qualified Foreign Institutional Investor one year later. In the same year, High-Flyer established High-Flyer AI which was dedicated to research on AI algorithms and its basic applications.

In 2020, High-Flyer established Fire-Flyer I, a supercomputer that focuses on AI deep learning. It cost approximately 200 million Yuan. In 2021, Fire-Flyer I was retired and was replaced by Fire-Flyer II which cost 1 billion Yuan. It contained 10,000 Nvidia A100 GPUs. By this year all of High-Flyer's strategies were using AI which drew comparisons to Renaissance Technologies.

At the end of 2021, High-Flyer put out a public statement on WeChat apologizing for its losses in assets due to poor performance. The performance of over 100 of its investment products declined by over 10%. High-Flyer stated that its AI models did not time trades well although its stock selection was fine in terms of long-term value. The models would take on higher risk during market fluctuations which deepened the decline. In addition the company stated it had expanded its assets too quickly leading to similar trading strategies that made operations more difficult. Up until this point, High-Flyer produced returns that were 20–50% more than stock-market benchmarks in the past few years.

In March 2022, High-Flyer advised certain clients that were sensitive to volatility to take their money back as it predicted the market was more likely to fall further.

In April 2023, High-Flyer announced it would form a new research body to explore the essence of artificial general intelligence. However it would not be used to perform stock trading. This organization would be called DeepSeek.

From 2018 to 2024, High-Flyer has consistently outperformed the CSI 300 Index. However, after the regulatory crackdown on quantitative funds in February 2024, High-Flyer's funds have trailed the index by 4 percentage points.

In July 2024, High-Flyer published an article in defending quantitative funds in response to pundits blaming them for any market fluctuation and calling for them to be banned following regulatory tightening. High-Flyer stated it held stocks with solid fundamentals for a long time and traded against irrational volatility that reduced fluctuations.

In October 2024, High-Flyer shut down its market neutral products, after a surge in local stocks caused a short squeeze.

High-Flyer was the second-best performer among Chinese quant funds in 2025 with a return of 56.6%.

== Corporate affairs ==
High-Flyer's investment and research team had 160 members as of 2021 which include Olympiad Gold medalists, internet giant experts and senior researchers. It has been trying to recruit deep learning scientists by offering annual salaries of up to 2 million Yuan.

In 2022, the company donated 221 million Yuan to charity as the Chinese government pushed firms to do more in the name of "common prosperity".

In March 2023, it was reported that High-Flyer was being sued by Shanghai Ruitian Investment LLC for hiring one of its employees. The rival firm stated the former employee possessed quantitative strategy codes that are considered "core commercial secrets" and sought 5 million Yuan in compensation for anti-competitive practices. In May 2023, the court ruled in favour of High-Flyer.

In October 2023, High-Flyer announced it had suspended its co-founder and senior executive Xu Jin from work due to his "improper handling of a family matter" and having "a negative impact on the company's reputation", following a social media accusation post and a subsequent divorce court case filed by Xu Jin's wife regarding Xu's extramarital affair.

== See also ==
- Lingjun Investment
- Minghong Investment
- Hedge fund industry in China
- Ubiquant
