= Asset Management Association of China =

Organization of China

- Formation: June 6, 2012; 14 years ago
- Headquarters: Beijing, China
- Website: www.amac.org.cn

The Asset Management Association of China (AMAC) is a self-regulatory association of fund management companies in China.

== Overview ==
ACAM is one of three major membership organizations under the China Securities Regulatory Commission (CSRC), together with the Securities Association of China (SAC) and China Futures Association (CFA).

== See also ==
- National Association of Financial Market Institutional Investors
- Asset management in China
