= Igor Tulchinsky =

Belarusian-American financial entrepreneur

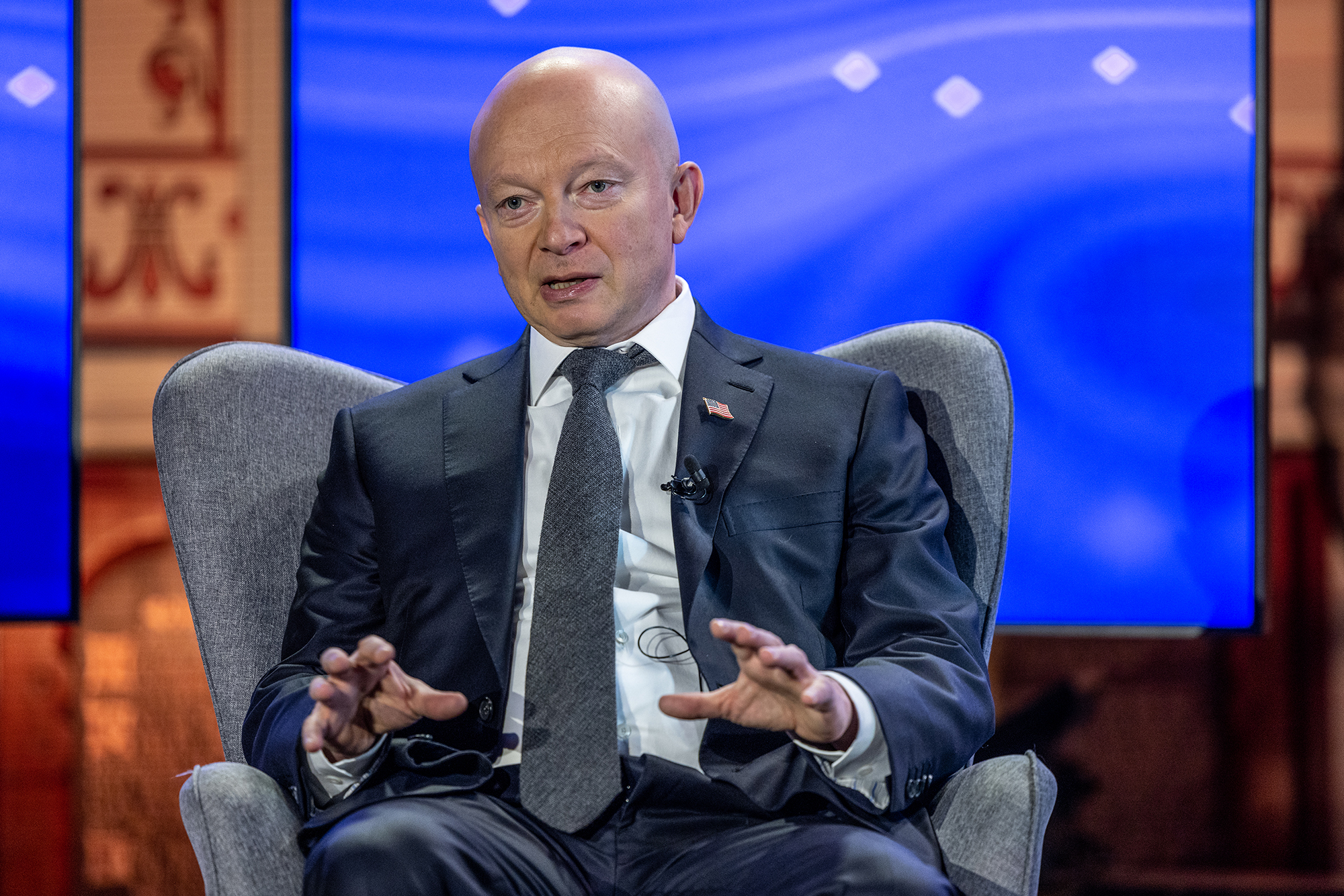
- Speaking at the 2023 World Economic Forum
- Born: 1966 (age 59–60); Minsk, Belarus SSR, Soviet Union
- Education: University of Texas at Austin (BA, MA); University of Pennsylvania (MBA)
- Occupations: Investor, writer, philanthropist

Igor Tulchinsky (born 1966) is an investor, entrepreneur, venture capitalist, author and philanthropist. He is the founder, chairman and CEO of WorldQuant, a global quantitative asset management firm with over $7 billion in assets under management that he founded in 2007.

== Early life and education ==
Tulchinsky was born in 1966 in Minsk, Belarus SSR, Soviet Union. His parents were both professional musicians. Tulchinsky is of Jewish descent. He told The Jerusalem Post in an interview, "Living in the Soviet Union, I was considered, and considered myself, Jewish. But it was more of an ethnic factor." In 1977, the family immigrated to the US where Igor had the chance to learn more about finance and computer science. He holds a B.A. with honors and M.A. in computer science from the University of Texas at Austin, and an MBA in finance and entrepreneurship from the University of Pennsylvania.

== Career ==
Tulchinsky started his career in 1988 at AT&T Bell Laboratories, where he held the position of scientist for over three years. Prior to this, he spent time as a video game programmer.

In the early 1990s, Tulchinsky worked as a trading strategist for Timber Hill (now part of Interactive Brokers), before moving to Millennium Management, an investment management firm that manages more than $57 billion in assets.

He spent 12 years at Millennium as a statistical-arbitrage portfolio manager before he founded WorldQuant in 2007. WorldQuant has a global workforce of more than 1,000 employees across 28 global offices, with many locations in nontraditional financial centers, including Ramat Gan, Budapest, Mumbai, Ho Chi Minh City and Seoul. This is in line with Tulchinsky's stated belief that "talent is distributed equally around the world, opportunity is not."

In 2014, Tulchinsky founded WorldQuant Ventures, an early-stage investment vehicle that invests in tech companies with a particular focus on data analytics and finance.

In 2014, Tulchinsky founded WorldQuant University, a US-accredited not-for-profit university, which offers an entirely free online master's degree in financial engineering and a data science module.

In early 2018, Tulchinsky founded WorldQuant Predictive, an artificial intelligence platform company that sells predictive analytics to corporate clients.

== Philanthropy ==
In 2017, Tulchinsky made a gift of $5 million to launch the WorldQuant Initiative for Quantitative Prediction at Weill Cornell Medicine. This research initiative aims to enhance current methods used in precision medicine by combining molecular profiling with financial algorithms. He is a Board of Fellows member at Weill Cornell Medicine.

In 2025, Tulchinsky supported the Jerusalem Masters' chess tournament. In February 2026, Tulchinsky sponsored the transport and display of the Bayeux Tapestry for its exhibition at the British Museum in September of that year.

Over the years Tulchinsky has supported many Jewish institutions, including the renovation of the Rákospalota Synagogue and Dessewffy Street Synagogue in Budapest and Chabad's Mayanot Institute of Jewish Studies in Jerusalem.

== Publications ==
In 2015, Tulchinsky published Finding Alphas: A Quantitative Approach to Building Trading Strategies, and in 2018, he published The UnRules: Man, Machines and the Quest to Master Markets. In 2023, he released his third book The Age of Prediction: Algorithms, AI, and the Shifting Shadows of Risk, co-authored with Christopher E. Mason.

Tulchinsky has published material for and commented across various global organizations, publications and think-tanks, including the Financial Times, The Wall Street Journal, World Economic Forum, Milken Institute, Harvard Business Review, Institutional Investor, Calcalist, and Fox Business.
