= Tulchinsky =

Tulchinsky is a surname. Notable people with the surname include:

- Aren X. Tulchinsky (born 1958), Canadian novelist
- Igor Tulchinsky (born 1966), Belarusian businessman
