= Israel Englander =

American billionaire hedge fund manager (born 1948)

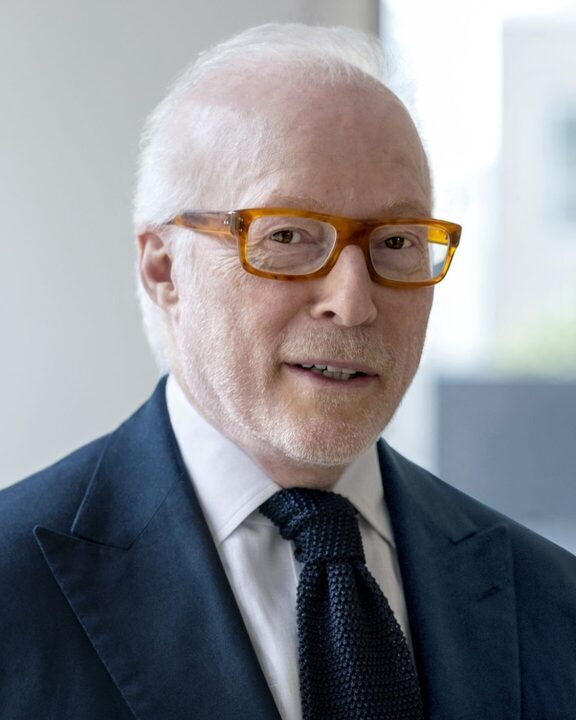
- Born: September 30, 1948 (age 78); New York City, U.S.
- Other name: Izzy Englander
- Education: New York University (BS)
- Occupations: Hedge fund manager; Philanthropist
- Known for: Founder and CEO, Millennium Management
- Spouse: Caryl Schechter (divorced)
- Children: 3

Israel Alexander Englander (born September 30, 1948) is an American billionaire hedge fund manager. In 1989, he founded his hedge fund, Millennium Management, with Ronald Shear. The fund was started with US$35 million, and as of July 2026 had US$92 billion in assets under management.

As of September 2025, Forbes estimated his net worth at US$27.6 billion.

== Early life and education ==
Israel "Izzy" Englander was born in 1948 and was raised in a Polish-Jewish family in the Crown Heights neighborhood of Brooklyn, New York. He was raised in a religious home and attended yeshiva.

His father's entire family was killed in the Holocaust. His Polish parents were deported to a Soviet labor camp after the war, where Englander's two older sisters were born. They then immigrated to the United States in 1947.

Always interested in the stock market, Englander began trading stocks while in high school. During college, he interned at Oppenheimer & Co. (where his future brother-in-law, Jack Nash, would eventually become president and chairman) and at the New York Stock Exchange. In 1970, he graduated from New York University with a B.S. in finance. His first full-time job was with the Wall Street firm Kaufmann, Alsberg & Co. He later enrolled in New York University's MBA program in the evenings but never completed the degree.

== Investment career ==
=== Early business career ===
At Kaufmann Alsberg, Englander focused on trading convertible securities and options. When the American Stock Exchange began to list options, he purchased a seat on the exchange. In 1977, he formed a floor brokerage house, I.A. Englander & Co.

In 1985, Englander and his partner John Mulheren Jr., started an investment firm called Jamie Securities Co. with a $75 million investment from the Belzberg family of Canada. Mulheren had previously worked as a trader for Ivan Boesky. In February 1988, when Boesky was later convicted of insider trading, and agreed to testify against Mulheren in a plea deal to receive a lesser sentence, Mulheren was arrested for carrying a loaded rifle and convicted of orchestrating illegal stock trades for Boesky, but the ruling was later overturned. Although Englander was never implicated in the matter in any way whatsoever, Jamie Securities was dissolved in 1988 due to the negative publicity in the aftermath of Mulheren's situation.

=== Millennium Management ===
In 1989, Englander started Millennium Management with Ronald Shear—whom he knew from his time at the American Stock Exchange—with $35 million in seed money (including $5 million from Englander himself and another $2 million from the Belzberg family). The firm got off to a rough start and Shear left in 1990. Since then, Englander has grown Millennium into a $39.2 billion (under management) enterprise by using investment strategies like statistical arbitrage (quantitative analysis); fundamental long-short investing; merger arbitrage (taking advantage of price differentials between a buy-out target company's stock price and bid price) and convertible arbitrage (taking advantage of price differentials between a company's stock price and convertible bond or stock warrant price). At any given time, Millennium holds thousands of investment positions and makes over 10 million trades on an average day. As of July 2026, Millennium had 6,800+ employees in 18 primary offices in the United States, Europe, and Asia.

== Personal life ==
Englander was married to Caryl (née Schechter) Englander until 2023. They have three children. In 2014, he bought a duplex apartment at New York City's Park Avenue for US$71.3 million, a record price for a Manhattan co-op.

In 2022, he acquired a $20 million apartment near Les Invalides in Paris, formerly owned by the Bettencourt family, founding family of L'Oréal.

== Wealth and philanthropy ==
In 2006, the Englander Foundation, headed by Englander and his wife, donated $20 million to mostly Jewish organizations and schools. Englander serves on the board of Weill Cornell Medical College and the Metropolitan Council on Jewish Poverty. In March 2019, he was named one of the highest-earning hedge fund managers and traders by Forbes.

== See also ==
- WorldQuant
