= WorldQuant University =

Not-for-profit quantitative finance university

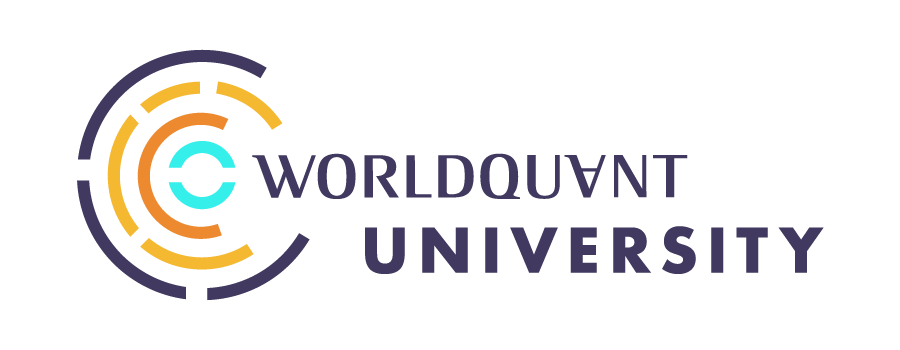
- Other name: WQU
- Motto: "Talent is global, opportunity is not"
- Type: Private (non-profit), distance education university
- Established: 2015
- Accreditation: Distance Education Accrediting Commission
- Students: 16000+
- Location: Washington, D.C., United States
- Campus: Online
- Language: English
- Website: wqu.edu

WorldQuant University (WQU) is a private, not-for-profit online university headquartered in Washington, D.C., United States. It is accredited by the Distance Education Accrediting Commission.

As of March 2025, WQU has graduated over 1500 students from the Master of Science in Financial Engineering program and conferred credentials from their Lab offerings to more than 4,000 learners from over 150 countries. WQU's programs are free-of-charge.

== History ==
WorldQuant University was founded by Igor Tulchinsky in 2015 on the premise that talent is global, opportunity is not. The University is funded by the WorldQuant Foundation. After being licensed by the Louisiana Board of Regents, the Foundation launched WQU in 2015 enrolling several hundred students in a free, online Master's degree in Quantitative Finance. As its first president, Sarah McCue, PhD, conceptualized and led the launch of WQU's financial engineering Master's Degree.

Daphne Kis, who had served on the University's Advisory Board, was brought on as CEO and Board Director in 2017. In 2023, Ms. Kis transitioned from CEO to President. John Endrud, formerly of Collegis Education, was brought in as CEO.

In late 2016, the university was awarded the 2016 Dive Award: Startup of the Year by the publication Education Dive. By June 2017, it had enrolled 700 students from 40 countries. In 2021, WQU was accredited by the Distance Education Accrediting Commission (DEAC). Through WorldQuant, it is a Strategic Partner of the Milken Institute and the World Economic Forum (WEF).

=== Advisory board ===
WorldQuant University’s Advisory Board is a group of prominent leaders in the finance, business, and education sectors who function as advocates and advisors. Active members provide support regarding educational requirements, professional preparation, and overall workplace development to WQU leadership.

WQU’s Advisory Board meets on a regular basis. Members of the Advisory Board include Linda Ban, Lydiah Kemunto Bosire, Lenore Blum, Marc Carletti, Bruno Dupire, Esther Dyson, Paul Tudor Jones, Ann Kirschner, Alex Lipton, Christopher Mason, Mel Ochoa, David Shrier, and Susan Wolford.

== Academics ==
WorldQuant University offers a tuition-free, two-year Master of Science in Financial Engineering (MScFE), as well as two self-paced, non-degree programs: the Applied Data Science Lab and the Applied AI Lab. Completing the MScFE results in an accredited master's degree, while completing a lab earns a digital certificate issued through Credly.

=== Accreditation ===
WorldQuant University is accredited in all 50 states by the Distance Education Accrediting Commission (DEAC), a United States Department of Education recognized accreditor. The State Authorization Reciprocity Agreement (NC-SARA) has also approved WQU to offer its online education programs to students in 49 US states, the District of Columbia, and US territories. The University also enrolls students in California under a non-profit exemption.

=== MSc in Financial Engineering ===
WorldQuant University's entirely-free, accredited, online MSc in Financial Engineering Program integrates mathematical, statistical, and computer science tools with finance theory and professional business skills. The two-year program consists of nine graduate-level courses and a Capstone course during which students complete a culminating project. Course topics span financial markets, data feeds, and computational finance, among other subjects.

== See also ==
- Cooperative learning
- Cooperative education
- Open educational resources
- Online learning
