= Dessewffy Street Synagogue =

Synagogue in Budapest, Hungary

Religion
- Affiliation: Orthodox Judaism
- Rite: Nusach Ashkenaz
- Ecclesiastical or organisational status: Synagogue
- Status: Active

Location
- Location: Budapest, VI. Dessewffy utca 23
- Country: Hungary

Architecture
- Type: Synagogue architecture
- Groundbreaking: 1870

The Dessewffy Street Synagogue, in Budapest's Sixth District, is one of the oldest functioning synagogues in Hungary's capital.

== History ==
In 1870 Jewish coachmen and porters working at the Nyugati Railway Station converted a nearby barn and stables into a synagogue they could use as a place of worship.

Shortly after, the synagogue became affiliated with the Bikur Cholim aid society, and the building hosted a religious elementary school alongside the prayers. In 1925 the Bikur Cholim society renovated the place, adding a gallery for women and other architectural and design elements.

In the mid-1930s a Carrara marble art deco bimah was added to the building.

While the synagogue operated almost continuously since its opening, in the early 2000s it was shut down due to both problematic physical conditions and dwindling attendance.

In September 2026 the synagogue was reopened after an extensive restoration project supported by philanthropist Igor Tulchinsky and led by the Autonomous Orthodox Jewish Community of Hungary, an organization affiliated with Chabad.
