= Jack Nash (businessman) =

American businessman and investor (1929–2008)

- Born: Jack Nachtgeist; April 10, 1929; Berlin, Germany
- Died: July 30, 2008 (aged 79); New York City, U.S.
- Resting place: Beth El Cemetery; 40.969595 N; 74.049812 W
- Education: City College of New York
- Occupation: financier
- Known for: Founder, The New York Sun; President, Oppenheimer & Company
- Spouse: Helen Englander
- Children: 2

Jack Nash (April 10, 1929 – July 30, 2008) was a German-born American businessman and investor. He was president of Oppenheimer & Company and founded The New York Sun newspaper.

== Early life and education ==
On April 10, 1929, Nash was born in Berlin as Jack Nachtgeist to Jewish parents. It is a family story that as a child, during a Nazi rally, he would not give the one-arm salute that demonstrated loyalty to the Reich. The family would later flee Nazi Germany prior to the onset of World War II. Nash and his sister were sent to a Swiss boarding school by their parents for their own safety before later immigrating to the United States. There he attended Stuyvesant High School in Manhattan, New York, and graduated from City College of New York in 1953.

== Investment career ==
Nash joined Oppenheimer & Company in 1951 and became its president in 1974. He was elected chairman in 1979. In 1982, he and business partner Leon Levy sold the company for $163 million, investing $50 million to start the hedge fund, Odyssey Partners. Nash was also a founder of The New York Sun and served as vice chairman of the board of the American Stock Exchange in the late 1970s.

== Personal life ==
Nash married Helen Englander in 1957, sister of billionaire investor Israel Englander. He and his wife donated millions to Jewish and other cultural and social charities. Although not Orthodox himself, Nash served as chairman of the Aleph Society, dedicated to promoting the works of Rabbi Adin Steinsaltz. Helen Nash has authored a line of kosher cookery books. They had two children, Joshua and Pamela, and six grandchildren.

Nash died on July 30, 2008, after a long illness, at Mount Sinai Medical Center.

== Legacy and awards ==
In 2008, he was inducted into Institutional Investors Alpha's Hedge Fund Manager Hall of Fame along with Alfred Jones, Bruce Kovner, David Swensen, George Soros, James Simons, Julian Roberston, Kenneth Griffin, Leon Levy, Louis Bacon, Michael Steinhardt, Paul Tudor Jones, Seth Klarman and Steven A. Cohen.

== See also ==
- List of City College of New York alumni
