= Kaufmann, Alsberg & Co. =

Financial services company

Kaufmann, Alsberg & Co. was a trading, investment banking and brokerage firm. Under the leadership of Irwin Guttag, it became a purely trading company. With Guttag at the helm, it was sold to American Savings and Loan of Florida in 1984 for $29 million.

Among its most famous alumnus is Israel Englander, who joined the company in 1970 upon his graduation in 1970. Englander left Kaufmann, Alsberg in 1977.
