= Millennium Management =

Global investment management firm

Millennium Management LLC
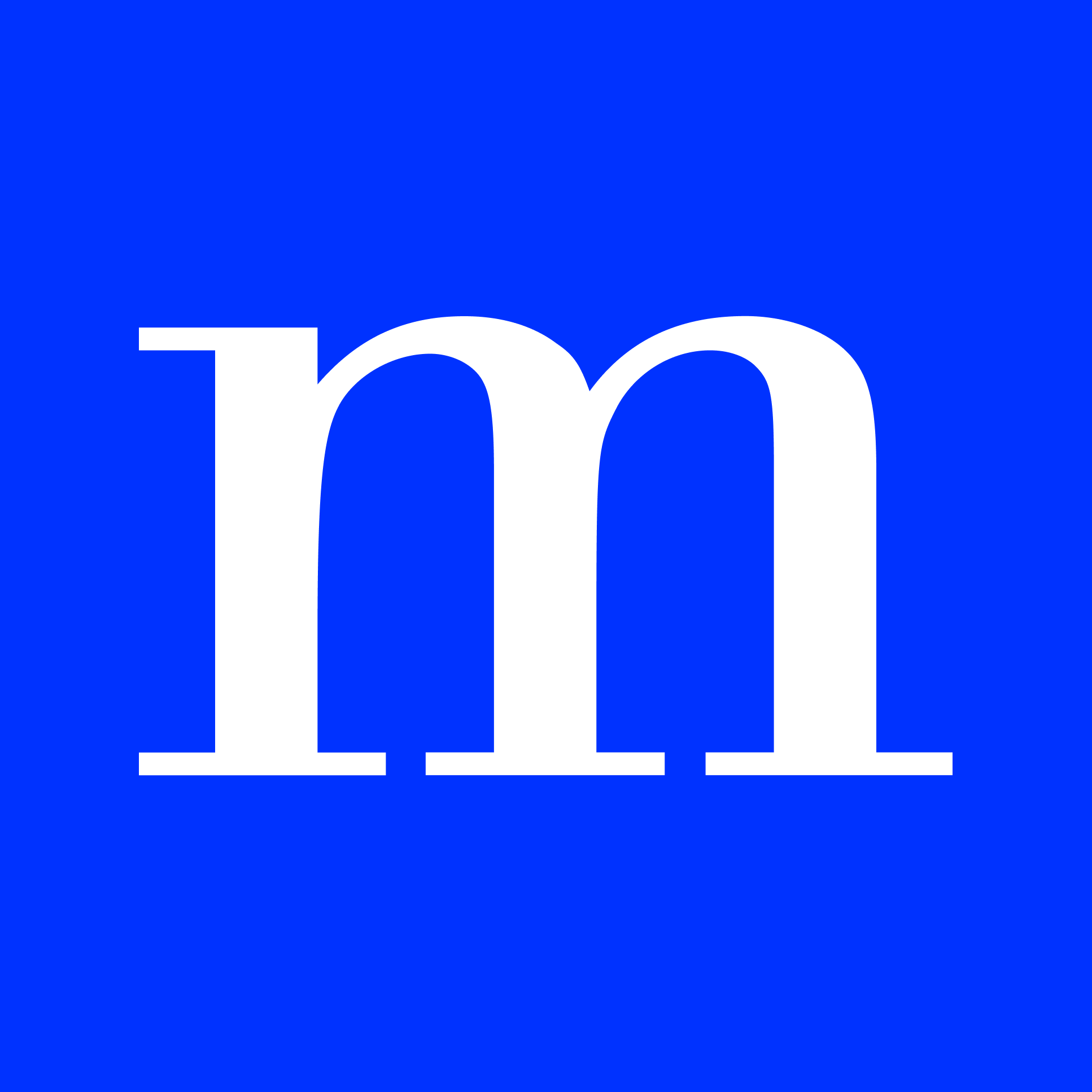

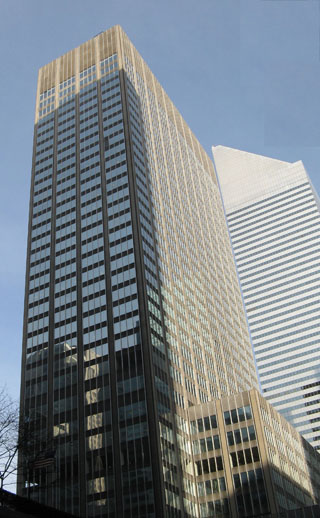
- Headquarters at 399 Park Avenue
- Type: Private
- Industry: Hedge fund
- Founded: 1989; 37 years ago
- Founders: • Israel Englander (1989―present. Chairman and Chief Executive Officer); • Ronald Shear (1989―left after 6 months)
- Headquarters: New York, U.S.
- Key people: • Ajay Nagpal (President & COO); • John Novogratz (Head of capital development and investor relations)
- Products: Hedge fund
- AUM: US$ 97 billion (as of September 2026)
- Number of employees: 6,800+ (July 2026)
- Subsidiaries: WorldQuant
- Website: www.mlp.com

Millennium Management LLC is an investment management firm with a multistrategy hedge fund offering. It is one of the world's largest alternative asset management firms, with approximately $97 billion in assets under management as of September 2026. The firm operates in America, Europe and Asia. As of 2022, Millennium had posted the fourth highest net gains of any hedge fund since its inception in 1989.

== History ==
Israel A. Englander and Ronald Shear, an acquaintance from the American Stock Exchange (AMEX), founded the firm in 1989 with $35 million. The initial $35 million consisted of $5 million from Englander and "$2 million from the Belzberg brothers, wealthy Canadian financiers." Millennium Management initially underperformed and co-founder Ronald Shear left the firm six months after founding it.

In 2016, Millennium hired Bobby Jain, then global head of Credit Suisse Asset Management, to join Israel Englander as co-CIO. Jain left Millennium in June 2023. Three years later in April 2026, Bobby Jain has returned to Millennium to exclusively manage money for his former employer in a partnership similar to that of WorldQuant.

In the spring of 2018, Millennium launched a joint venture with WorldQuant, a quantitative investment management firm.

In 2019, London-based investment firm LCH Investment ranked Millennium Management 12th on their ranking of most successful hedge funds of all time reporting that since its founding in 1989 the firm had made $22.4 billion for its investors, an average of 14% annually since inception. In 2019, the company raised $4.1 billion after a two-year hiatus from raising new capital. The company expects to have raised $7.1 billion by March 2020 and manages a total of nearly $50 billion in capital. The company ended the year 2020 with 265 portfolio manager teams, the most in its history. As of February 2020, Millennium managed over 2,000 data sets from close to 400 providers, for a total of about 10 trillion records of data and over 2,000 terabytes of compressed stored data.

In September 2026, Millennium received more than $30 billion in investor commitments for a new capital-raising initiative, exceeding its original target of $20 billion. The firm finalized approximately $22 billion of those commitments on October 1.

== Company ==
=== Investment team structure ===
The company has a platform model of investing made up of approximately 280 investment teams with each portfolio manager allocated money "to deploy in a variety of trading strategies."

=== Locations ===
The company has 18 primary offices including regional offices in London, Hong Kong, Dubai, Singapore, Miami, Bengaluru, Tel Aviv, Tokyo, Dublin, Greenwich, Geneva, Zug and Paris, with its principal office in New York, in addition to operating additional offices in locations around the world.
