= Rákospalota Synagogue =

Synagogue in Budapest, Hungary

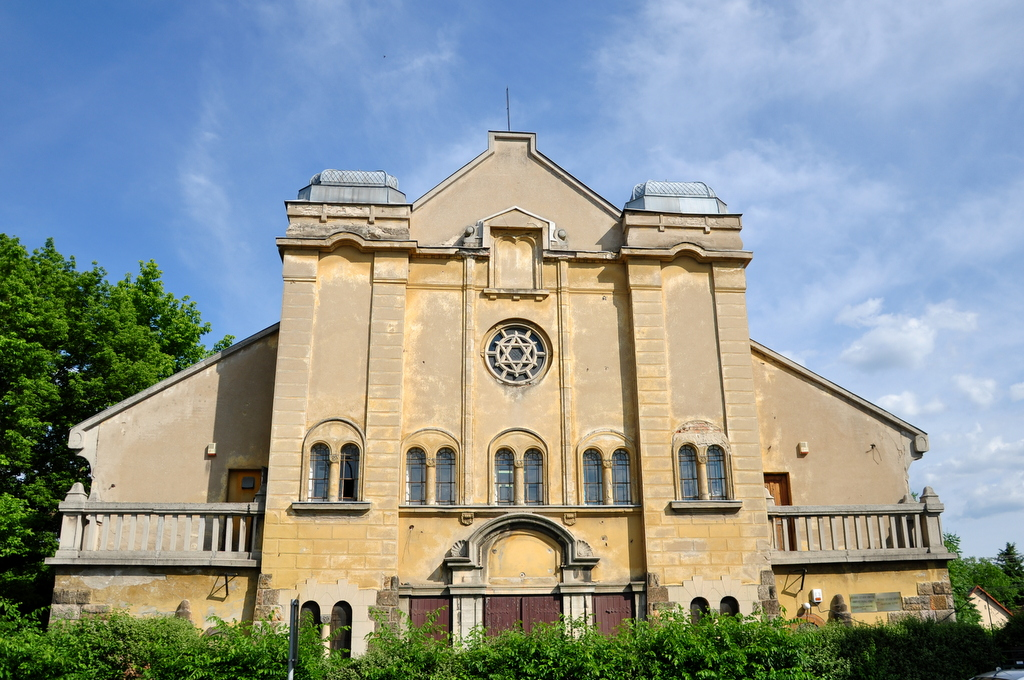
- The building in 2012

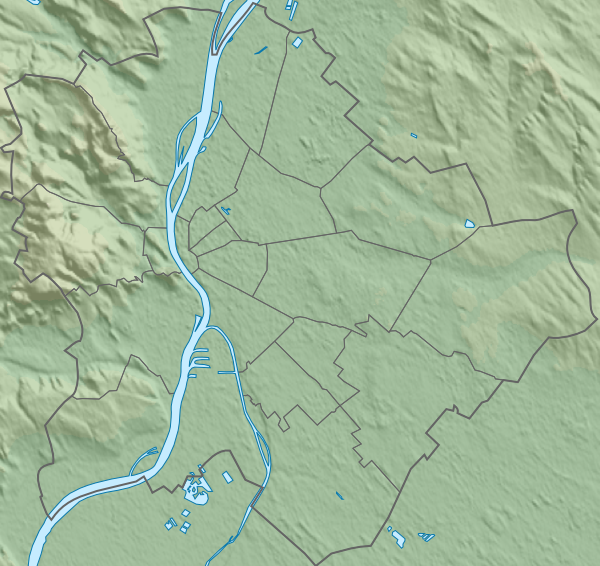
- Location of the synagogue building in Budapest

Religion
- Affiliation: Neolog Judaism (former)
- Rite: Nusach Ashkenaz
- Ecclesiastical or organisational status: Active as a synagogue 1927–circa 1939, and since 2026
- Status: Active

Location
- Location: Old Fóti Road, Rákospalota, XVth district, Budapest
- Country: Hungary
- Coordinates: 47°33′37″N 19°07′20″E

Architecture
- Architects: Mihály Feith; Gábor Feith
- Type: Synagogue architecture
- Established: 1902 (as a congregation)
- Completed: 1927

The Rákospalota Synagogue is a Jewish congregation and synagogue, located on Old Fóti Road in Rákospalota, in the XVth district of Budapest, Hungary. Completed in 1927, the building was used a Neolog synagogue until World War II, and subsequently for profane use, including as a warehouse, from the 1960s. It reopened in 2026 after it was rededicated as a synagogue.

== History ==
The Jewish community of Rákospalota built the synagogue between 1926 and 1927 along what is now Old Fóti Road, just one block from the corner of Szentmihályi Road and Old Fóti Road. The building was designed by Mihály Feith and Gábor Feith.

The Jewish community in Rákospalota gained its independence in 1902. The first rabbi of the community, elected in 1898 – when the community still belonged to Újpest – was the legendary Chief Rabbi Yitzchak (Note: Yitzchak – a name added to him during illness according to Jewish custom.) Michael Dushinsky. (Note: There are many spellings of this family name, such as: Duschinsky, Dushinsky, also Duschinskie, also Dusinszky, and even Dušinský and Dušinski, and also Duszinski! And more; all according to the usual spelling in the same European country or in a mixture of spellings.) Dushinsky served as the community leader for 41 years until his death in 1939. Thanks to Dushinsky, the community enjoyed great public respect and esteem.

To cover the construction costs, a small, 44-page Book-of-Blessings was published in 1926, showing a drawing of the façade of the then-future building.

The synagogue became depopulated after World War II, due to the murder of Jews by the Nazis and their helpers among the Hungarians. The building was used as a map warehouse from the 1960s to the 1980s, when it was bought by the National Széchényi Library (NSZL) and used as one of NSZL's warehouses.

It reopened for religious use in 2026 after it was rededicated as a synagogue.

== Gallery ==
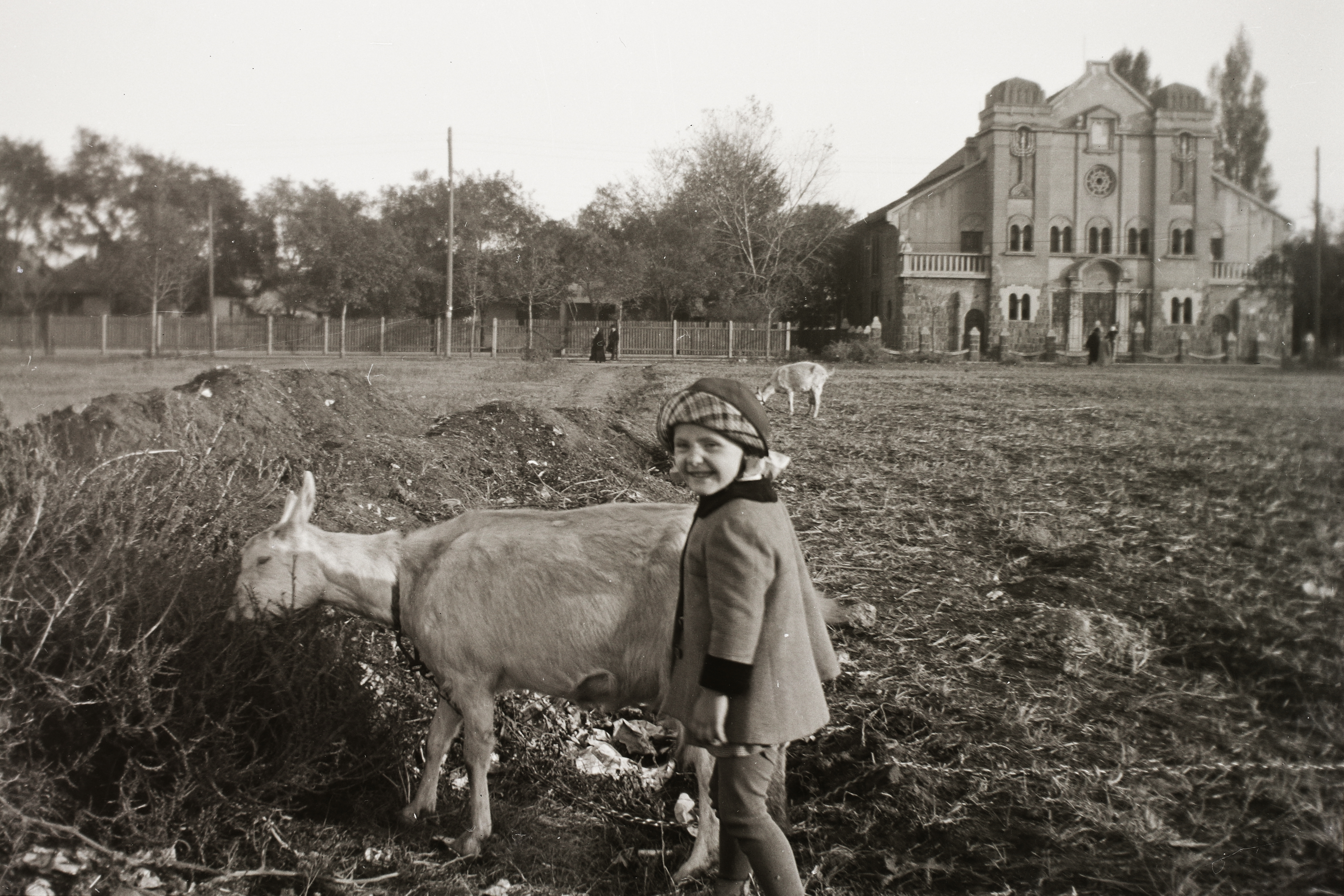

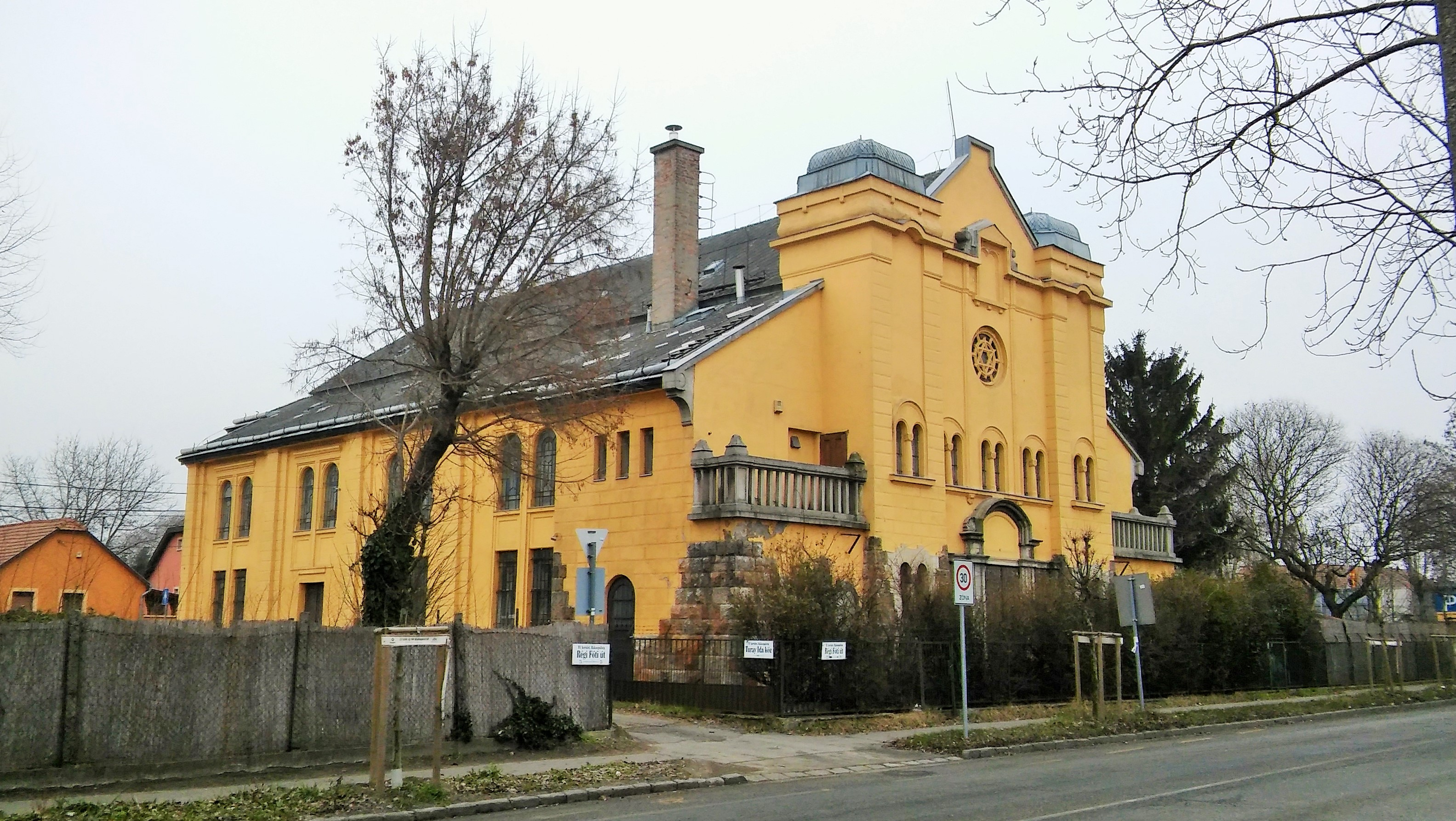

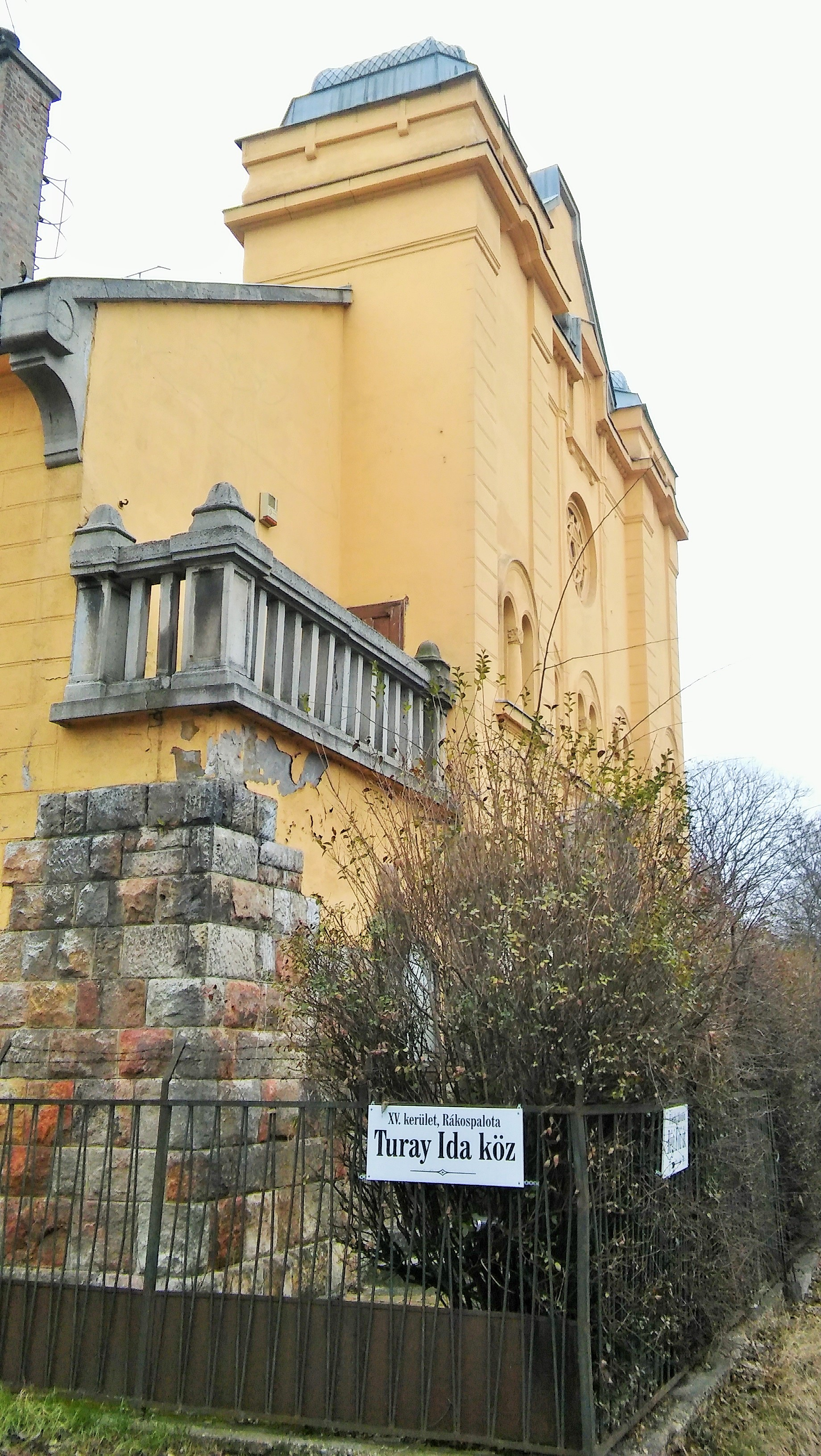

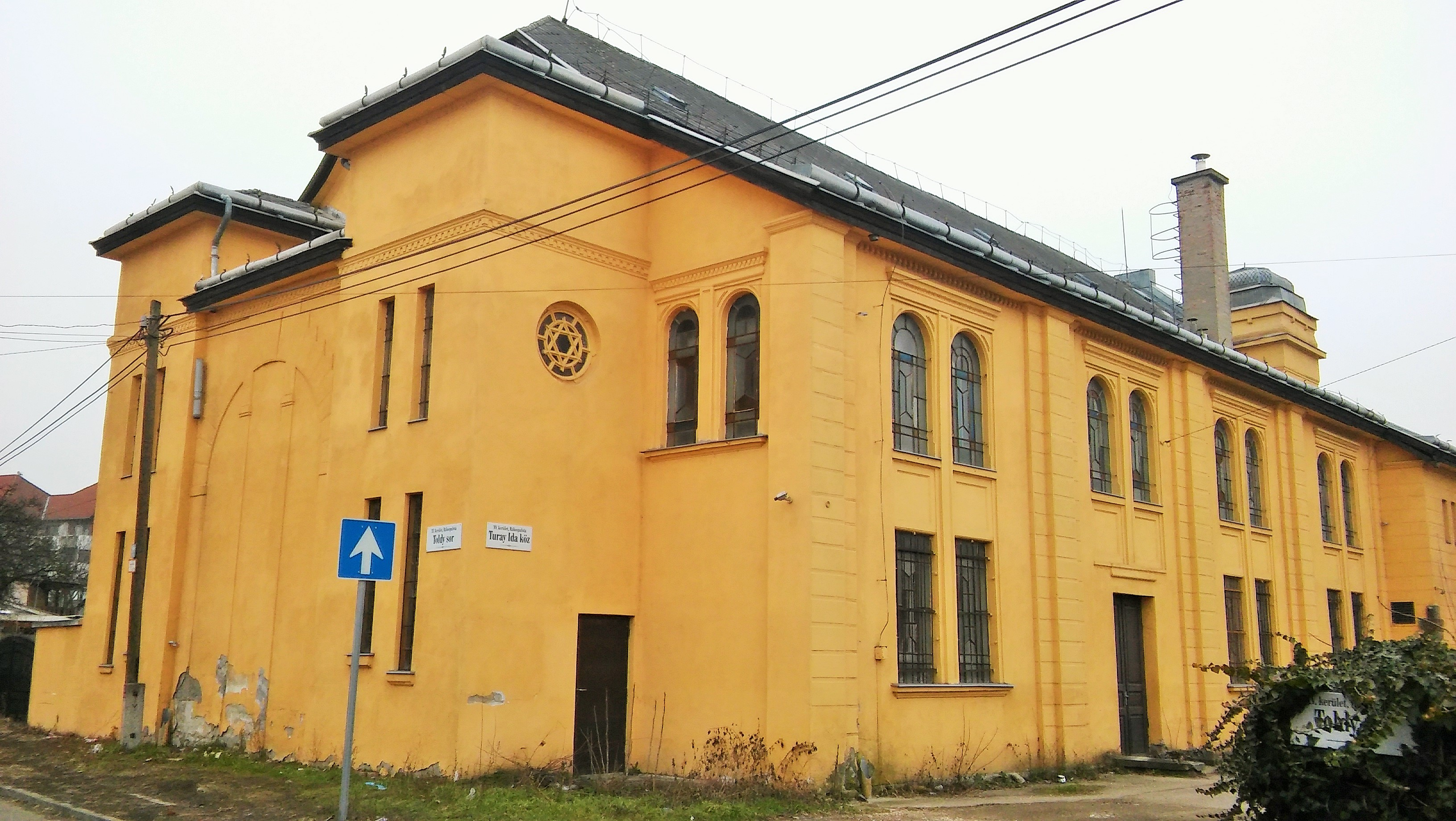

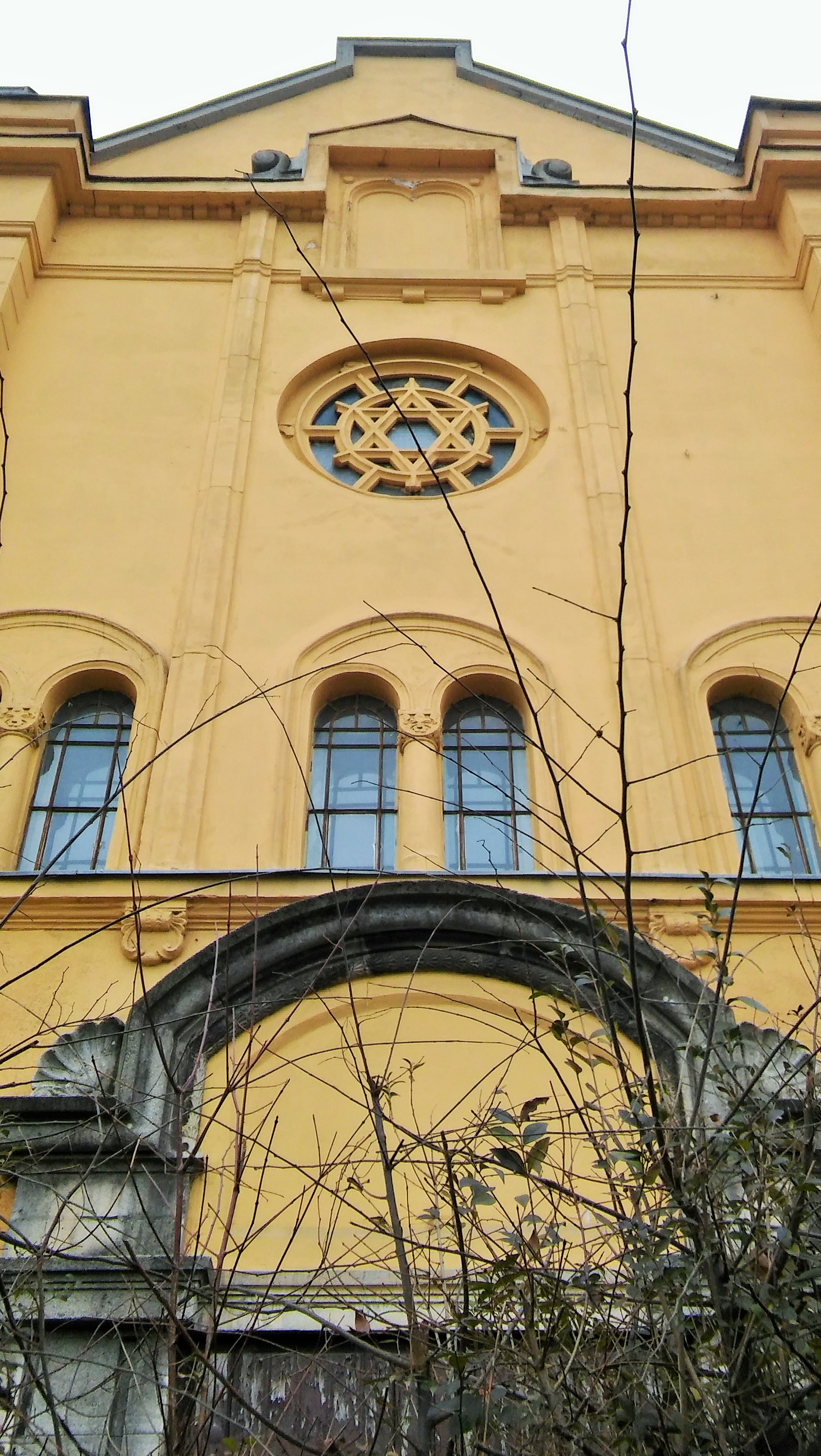

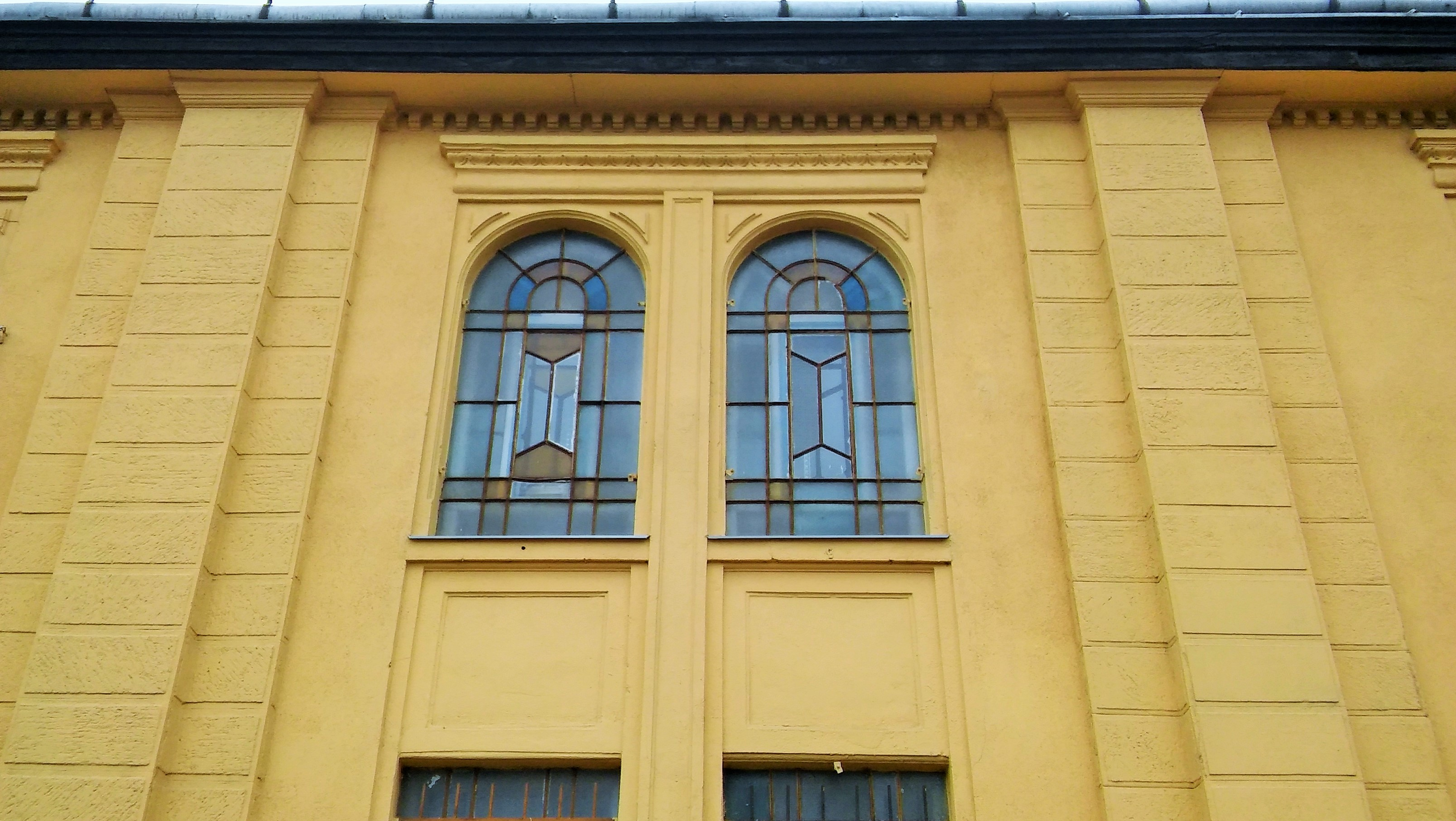

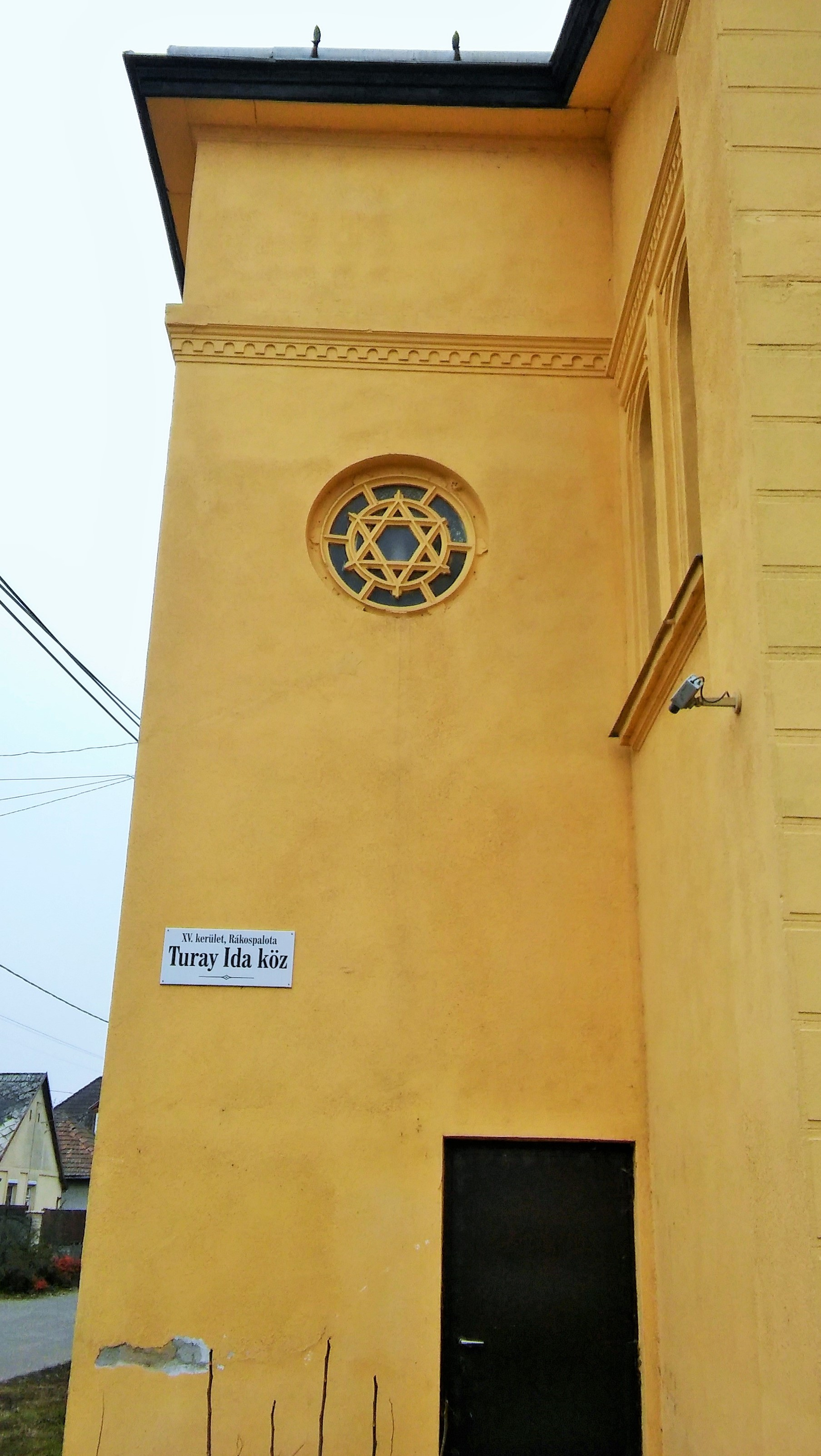

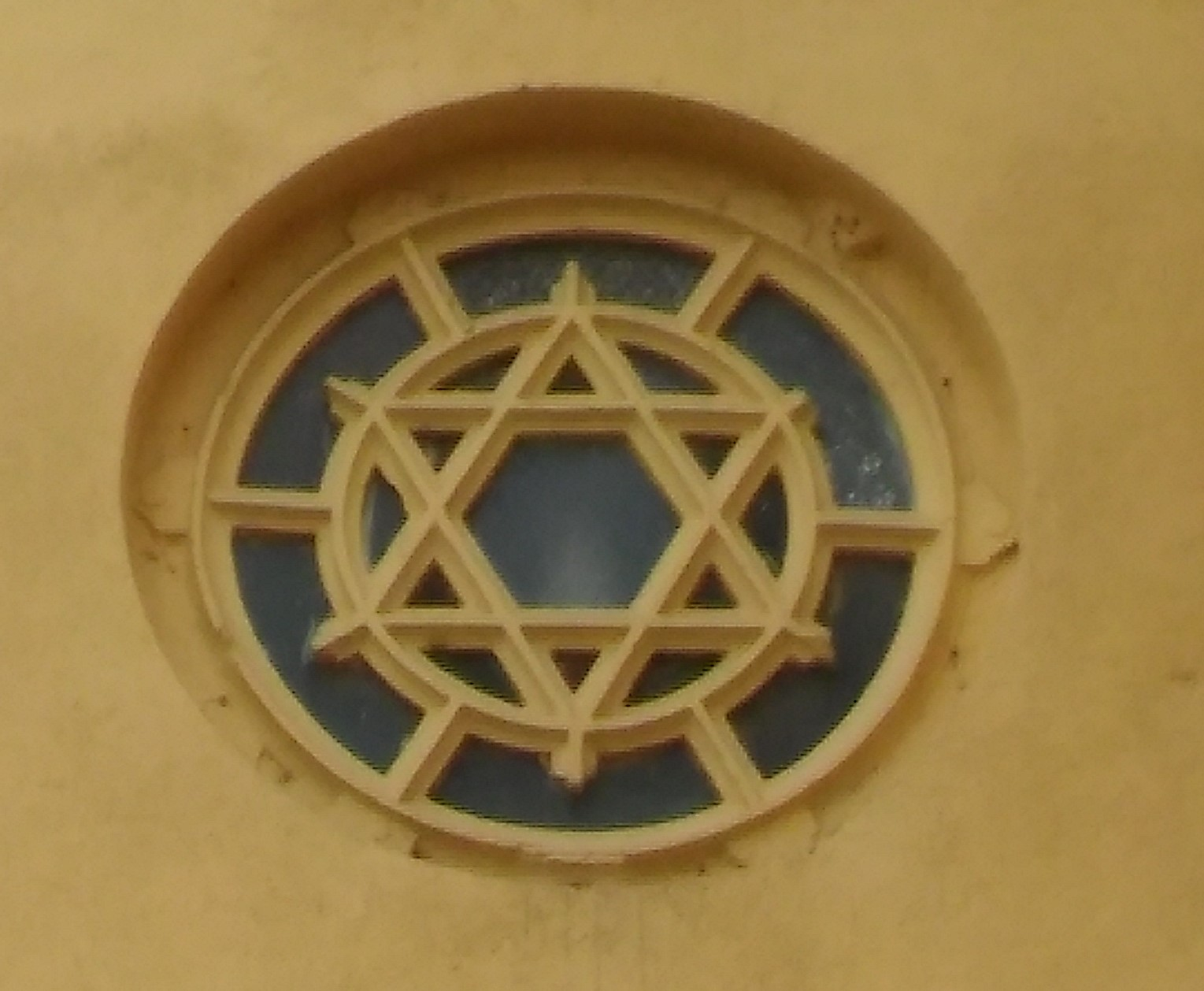

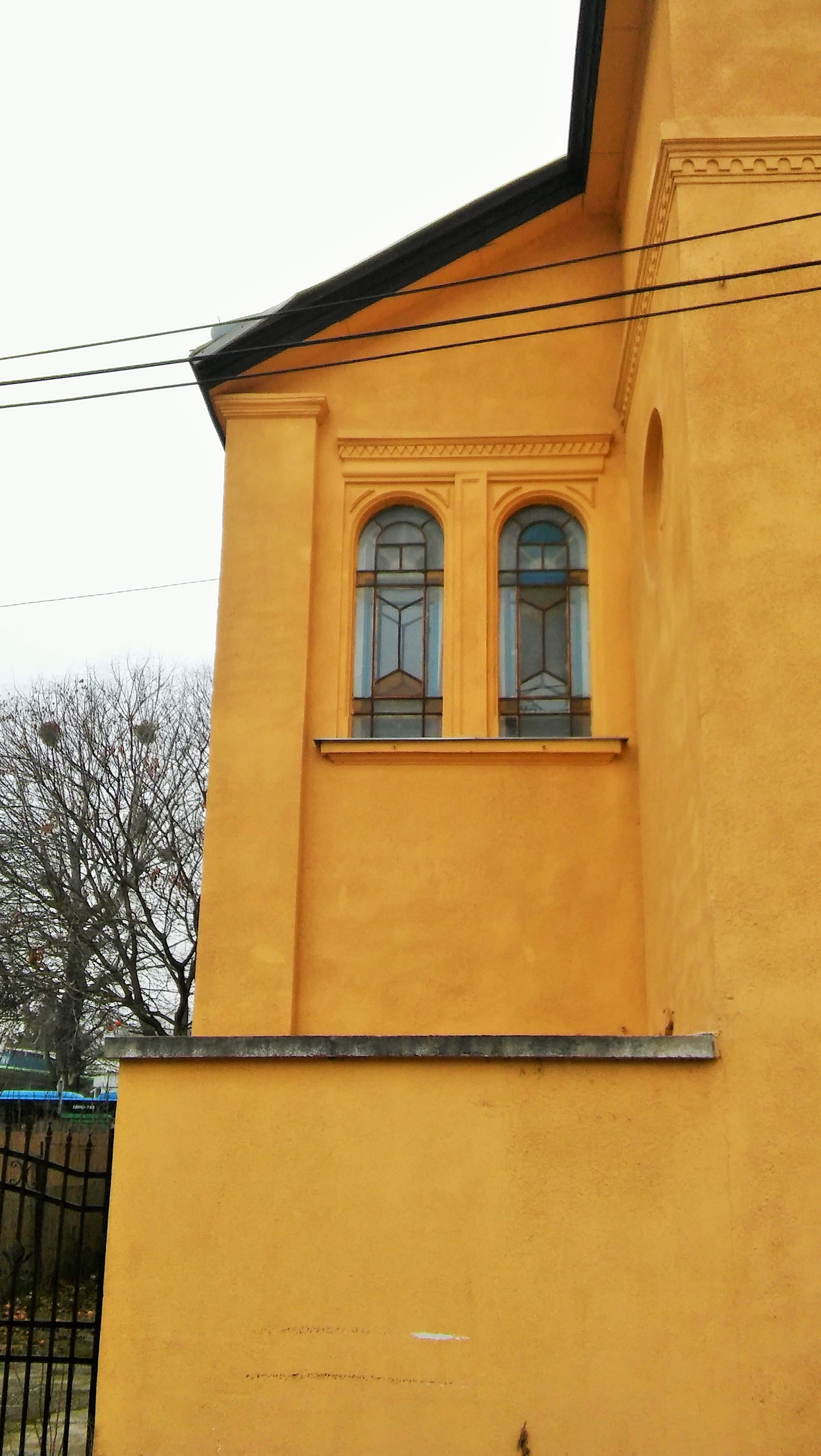

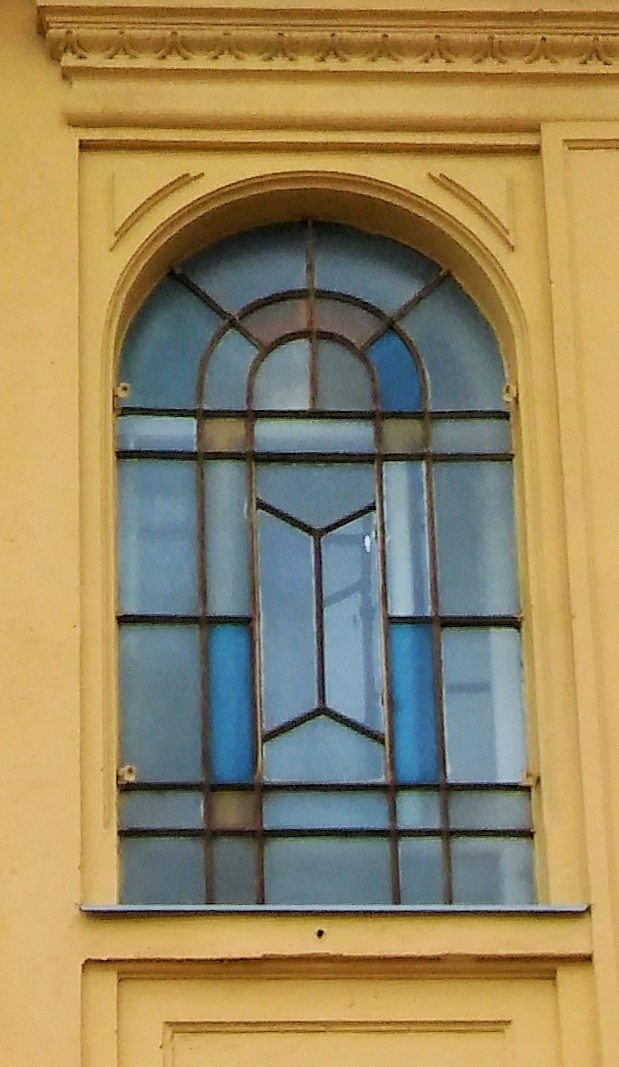

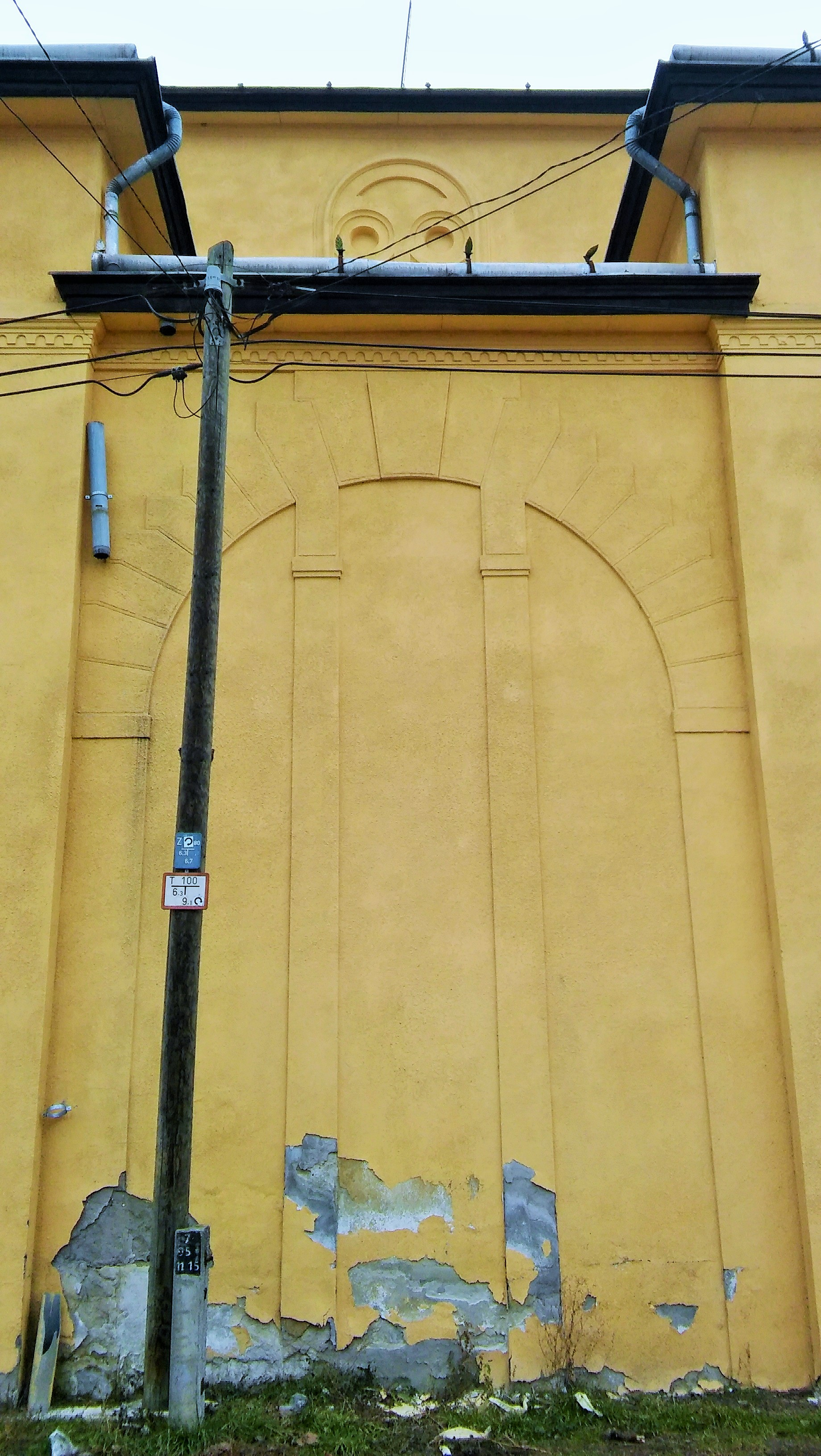

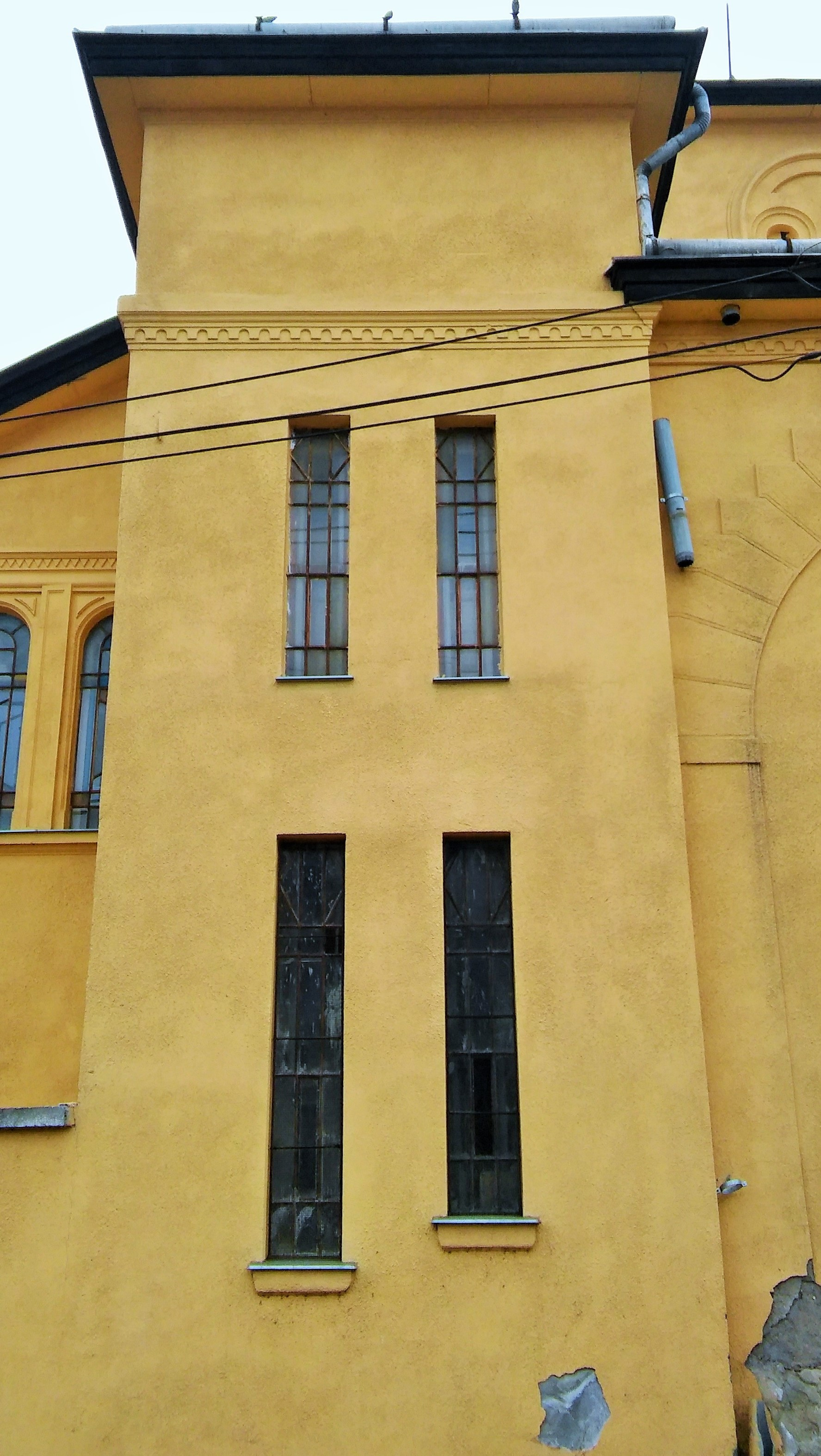

== See also ==
- History of the Jews in Hungary
- List of synagogues in Hungary
