= WorldQuant =

American international hedge fund and quantitative investment management firm

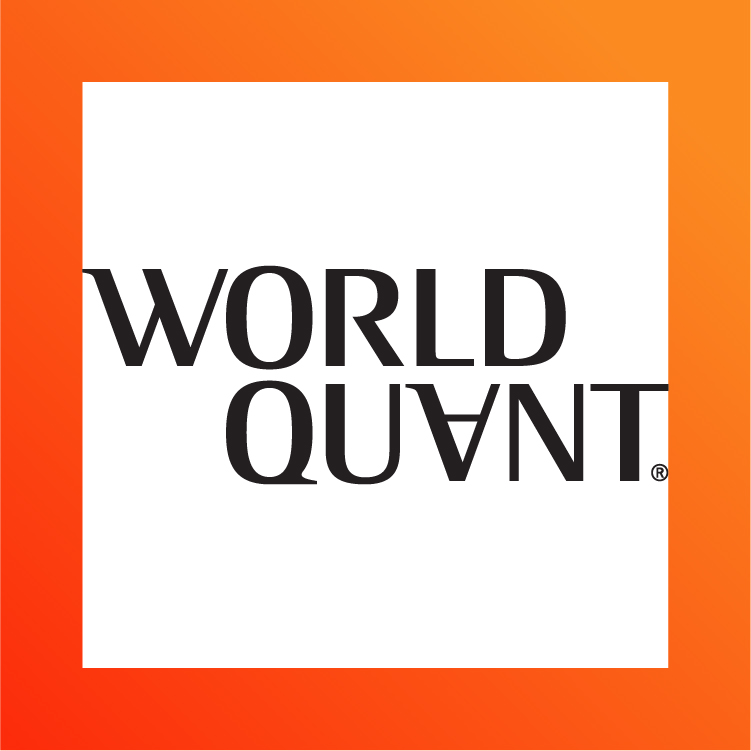
- Company type: Private
- Industry: Investment management
- Genre: Hedge fund
- Founded: 2007; 19 years ago in New York City, US
- Founder: Igor Tulchinsky
- Headquarters: Old Greenwich, Connecticut, US
- Number of locations: 28 offices (2026)
- Key people: Igor Tulchinsky (Chairman, CEO and Co-CIO); Nitish Maini (CSO); Paul Griffin (Co-CIO and CSO); Jeffrey Blomberg (CAO and General Counsel); Jonathan Marom (CFO); David Rukshin (CTO)
- Services: Quantitative trading and investing
- AUM: US$10 billion (2025)
- Owner: Igor Tulchinsky
- Number of employees: 1,000 (2024)
- Subsidiaries: WorldQuant University
- Website: worldquant.com

WorldQuant, LLC is an international hedge fund and quantitative investment management firm headquartered in Old Greenwich, Connecticut. Founded in 2007, the firm is reported to manage approximately $10 billion in assets under management as of 2025 for Millennium Management via quantitative trading and other methods of quantitative investing. WorldQuant operates the International Quant Championship, where participants compete in the field of quantitative finance. In 2015 the WorldQuant Foundation launched WorldQuant University.

== History ==
=== Millennium spinoff ===
WorldQuant, LLC was founded in 2007 as a quantitative investment management firm spun out of Millennium Management in New York City. Prior to forming WorldQuant, its Belarus-born founder Igor Tulchinsky (* 1966) had worked at Millennium as a portfolio manager since 1995. With a focus on statistical arbitrage, Tulchinsky's team of researchers and quantitative traders joined him at WorldQuant. The new fund continued to use Millennium's corporate infrastructure and trading platform.

=== Early history and recent developments ===
By April 2015, WorldQuant had 400 employees responsible for managing $4 billion of Millennium's funds, equating to approximately 15% of Millennium's total AUM. WorldQuant's business model continued to rely on data analysis to predict stock market behavior, with researchers analyzing "thousands of data sets to create so-called trading signals." Explains the Wall Street Journal, "A separate team focused on portfolio construction and management sorts through and combines [the trading signals], turning them into models. Many such models, which [are] continuously adjusted, [make] up a fund." By May 2016, WorldQuant had 18 offices with 450 professionals working as researchers, portfolio managers, and technologists.

In February 2017 WorldQuant announced the launch of WorldQuant Accelerator, an independent portfolio manager platform to compete with other open source trading platforms, mainly Numerai, Crunchdao, QuantConnect & Quantopian. At the time of its launch the new platform had 15 independent teams, with plans outlined to double that number over the next two years. The new platform allowed WorldQuant's independent portfolio managers to access WorldQuant technology such as back-testing technologies and impact modeling. The platform also allowed managers to retain the rights to their algorithms, a detail that Bloomberg said was "rare in the industry" and "could help WorldQuant compete for the top minds." The platform is no longer active.

By April 2017, WorldQuant managed more than $5 billion for Millennium Management. Although WorldQuant has never published performance numbers publicly, the Wall Street Journal reported in 2017 that the firm had "never had a down year."

== Competitions ==
By 2014, WorldQuant launched the WorldQuant Challenge, with around 30,000 people taking part by May 2016. The year-round competition allowed contestants to use WorldQuant's WebSim platform, an online "financial market simulation tool", to create their own algorithms, or "Alphas", in an effort to predict behavior in the stock market. The challenge resulted in 7,000 active users on the WebSim platform by March 2017, with hundreds of those users hired as part-time research consultants through WorldQuant's Research Consultant program at the time.

In 2018, WorldQuant launched the International Quant Championship (IQC), an international competition in which applicants develop mathematical models and algorithms to predict how prices of different financial instruments will change in the future, replacing the WorldQuant Challenge. The inaugural competition attracted 11,000 applicants, growing to 80,000 participants by 2025.

In 2022 WorldQuant initiated Global Alphathon, an international competition where quants build and submit alphas using WorldQuant’s BRAIN platform.

== Offices and employees ==
With headquarters in Old Greenwich, Connecticut, WorldQuant has 28 offices worldwide and approximately 1,000 employees.

By April 2017 WorldQuant had more than 500 employees, as well as 450 paid research consultants. 125 full-time employees were "PhDs scouring everywhere for recurring patterns that might boost returns," working as researchers or in other positions. The year prior, WorldQuant had settled out of court on a breach of contract suit concerning a former head of its data strategies. By November 2018, the company had 700 employees.

== Services and business model ==
WorldQuant LLC is a hedge fund and a quantitative investment management firm, providing related services such as portfolio management, market research, and trading. Described by the Wall Street Journal as "part of the forefront of a new quantitative renaissance in investing", the firm has a "computational" approach to its quantitative trading that utilizes "data mining, statistical methods and artificial intelligence". Deep learning and artificial intelligence are used as tools to help with small-scale trading.

According to Bloomberg on March 16, 2017, "WorldQuant claims to look at thousands of new information sources a year, no matter how exotic. From those, it's built a library of 4 million 'alphas', or pieces of predictive code that tell the computer to buy or sell. Some may be simple, others may be attempts to take advantage of market anomalies. Portfolio managers then construct strategies by using the alphas as building blocks, depending on which the current market environment favors, swapping out ones that may have lost their edge."

By April 2017 the company had analyzed new data sets, including items varying from shipping statistics to credit card receipts to parking lot traffic to market pricing data, creating and compiling 4 million alphas in a central repository called the "Alpha Factory". WorldQuant's online platform called WebSim allows its paid consultants to add algorithms to the repository. Other divisions within WorldQuant then combine the alphas into strategies, which are then turned "into bigger portfolios", largely related to stocks.

== Related enterprises ==
=== WorldQuant University ===
In 2015 the WorldQuant Foundation launched WorldQuant University, a free online master's degree program in financial engineering.

=== WorldQuant Ventures ===
In late 2014 Tulchinsky founded WorldQuant Ventures. Organized separately from WorldQuant as Tulchinsky's own angel investment fund, the firm's focus is on data and finance companies in "everything from artificial intelligence to water management." 2016 investments included Cycle Computing, Benzinga, and untapt, while 2017 investments included the Canadian research company Canalyst. In December 2021 WorldQuant Ventures invested in AngelList's Early Stage Quant Fund.

== See also ==
- List of hedge funds
- List of venture capital firms
- Mathematical finance
