= List of presidents of the Society for the Advancement of Scandinavian Study =

This is a list of presidents of the Society for the Advancement of Scandinavian Study.

- Thomas A. DuBois (2013–2015)
- Mark Sandberg, University of California, Berkeley (2011–2013)
- Jason Lavery, Oklahoma State University (2009–2011)
- Susan Brantly, University of Wisconsin–Madison (2007–2009)
- Christine Ingebritsen, University of Washington (2005–2007)
- Mary Kay Norseng, University of California, Los Angeles (2003–2005)
- Michael Metcalf, University of Mississippi (2001–2003)
- Ross Shideler, University of California, Los Angeles (1999–2001)
- Jenny Jochens, Towson State University (1997–1999)
- Marianne Kalinke, University of Illinois (1995–1997)
- Terje Leiren, University of Washington (1993–1995)
- Janet E. Rasmussen, Nebraska Wesleyan University (1991–1993)
- Byron J. Nordstrom, Gustavus Adolphus College (1989–1991)
- Birgitta Steene, University of Washington (1987–1989)
- Robert Kvavik, University of Minnesota (1985–1987)
- James E. Cathey, University of Massachusetts (1983–1985)
- H. Arnold Barton, Southern Illinois University at Carbondale (1982–1983)
- Theodore M. Anderson, Stanford University (1981–1982)
- M. Donald Hancock, Vanderbilt University (1980–1981)
- Rose-Marie Oster, University of Colorado (1979–1980)
- Richard F. Tomasson, University of New Mexico(1977–1979)
- Foster Blaisdell Jr., Indiana University (1975–1977)
- H. Peter Krosby, State University of New York (1973–1975)
- Nils Hasselmo, University of Minnesota (1971–1973)
- Niels Ingwersen, University of Wisconsin–Madison (1969–1971)
- Harald Næss, University of Wisconsin–Madison (1967–1969)
- Assar Janzén, University of California, Berkeley (1965–1967)
- Cecil Wood, University of Minnesota (1963–1965)
- P.M. Mitchell, University of Illinois (1961–1963)
- Lee M. Hollander, University of Texas (1959–1961)
- E. Gustav Johnson, North Park College (1958–1959)
- Richard Beck, University of North Dakota (1957–1958)
- Håkan Hamre, University of California, Berkeley (1956–1957)
- Paul Schach, University of Nebraska (1955–1956)
- Gösta Franzén, University of Chicago (1954–1955)
- Joseph Alexis, University of Nebraska (1953–1954)
- Adolph P. Bensen, Yale University (1952–1953)
- Sverre Arestad, University of Washington (1951–1952)
- Richard Beck, University of North Dakota (1950–1951)
- J. Jörgen Thompson, St. Olaf College (1949–1950)
- E. Gustav Johnson, North Park College (1946–1949)
- Carl E. W. L. Dahlström, University of Michigan (1942–1946)
- Richard Beck, University of North Dakota (1940–1942)
- Arthur E. Wald, Augustana College (1938–1940)
- Einar Haugen, University of Wisconsin–Madison (1936–1938)
- George Flom, University of Illinois (1934–1936)
- Henning Larsen, University of Iowa (1931–1934)
- Chester N. Gould, University of Chicago (1929–1931)
- Henning Larsen, University of Iowa (1927–1929)
- Chester N. Gould, University of Chicago (1925–1927)
- Jules Mauritzson, Augustana College (1923–1925)
- Henning Larsen, University of Iowa (1921–1923)
- Lee M. Hollander, University of Wisconsin–Madison (1919–1921)
- A. A. Stromberg, University of Minnesota (1917–1919)
- Chester N. Gould, University of Chicago (1915–1917)
- Jules Mauritzson, Augustana College (1913–1915)
- Julius E. Olson, University of Wisconsin–Madison (1911–1912)
