= Thomas A. DuBois =

American folklorist

Thomas A. DuBois is a folklorist, scholar of Sámi culture, professor, and the former chair of the Department of German, Nordic, and Slavic+ at the University of Wisconsin–Madison.

== Personal life ==
DuBois is married to Wendy Vardaman, a former Poet Laureate of Madison, Wisconsin.

== Career ==
Thomas A. DuBois received his Ph.D. in folklore and folklife from the University of Pennsylvania in 1990. He taught at the University of Washington from 1990-1999. While there, he founded the Finnish Studies Program in the Department of Scandinavian Studies and helped initiate the department's Baltic Studies program. In 2000, DuBois moved to the University of Wisconsin-Madison. He is a professor in the Scandinavian Studies Department, as well as the Department of Comparative Literature and Folklore Studies. DuBois has also served as the Director of the Religious Studies Program. His research interests include folklore and identity in the Nordic region, particularly in connection with Finnish, Sámi, and Swedish cultures. DuBois also researches the Baltic region and the broader cultural context of Northern Europe, as well as Celtic-Scandinavian cultural relations. DuBois has written, edited, or co-edited many books and has published articles in journals such as Journal of American Folklore, Journal of Finnish Studies, Scandinavian Studies, and Oral Tradition.

In 2013 and 2014, DuBois served as president of the Society for the Advancement of Scandinavian Study. In the Spring of 2017, DuBois was a fellow at the Swedish Collegium for Advanced Study in Uppsala, Sweden.

He is the editor of the Folklore of the Nordic-Baltic Region series, published by the Welsh Academic Press. Together with James P. Leary, he served as co-editor of the Journal of American Folklore. from 2011 to 2015.

DuBois has also translated into English Johan Turi's "An Account of the Sámi", the first secular book ever written in the Sámi language. The translation was published in 2011.

DuBois worked as a consultant for Disney on Frozen II.

== Awards ==
- In 2011, DuBois was awarded an honorary doctorate from the University of Umeå in Umeå, Sweden.
- In 2012, he won a Kellet Award from the University of Wisconsin-Madison.
- In 2016, he was inducted as a foreign member of the Finnish Academy of Science and Letters

== Works ==
- DuBois, Thomas (1995). Finnish Folk Poetry and the Kalevala. Routledge. ISBN 978-0815319757.
- DuBois, Thomas (1999). Nordic Religions in the Viking Age. University of Pennsylvania. ISBN 978-0-8122-1714-8. Archived from the original on May 11, 2000.
- DuBois, Thomas (2000). Finnish Folklore. Finnish Literature Society in association with the University of Washington Press. (co-authored with Leea Virtanen)
- DuBois, Thomas (2006). Lyric, Meaning, and Audience in the Oral Tradition of Northern Europe. Notre Dame University Press. ISBN 978-0-268-02589-2.
- DuBois, Thomas (2007). Sanctity in the North: Saints, Lives, and Cults in Medieval Scandinavia. University of Toronto Press. ISBN 978-0-268-02589-2. (ed.)
- DuBois, Thomas (2009). An Introduction to Shamanism. University of Toronto Press. ISBN 9780521873536.
- DuBois, Thomas (2009). The Nordic Storyteller: Essays in Honour of Niels Ingwersen. Cambridge Scholars Publishing. ISBN 978-1443801454. (ed. with Susan Brantly)
- Turi, Johan (2011). An Account of the Sámi. Nordic Studies Press. ISBN 978-0-9772714-5-0. (trans.)

== Films ==
- Wiigwaasi-Jiimaan: These Canoes Carry Culture
- Birchbark Canoes and Wild Rice
