= Jenny Jochens =

Danish medievalist (1928–2025)

Jenny Jochens (born Copenhagen 21 April 1928 – 6 July 2025) was a Danish-American historian specializing in medieval Iceland. She was best known for her influential work on the role of women in medieval Icelandic society, particularly through the lens of Old Norse sagas.

== Life and career ==
Jochens studied medieval history at the University of Copenhagen, specialising in French history and spending time researching in Paris. While in Paris, she met the American medieval historian John W. Baldwin, and married him, following him to the USA when he gained a post at Johns Hopkins University. She joined Towson State College (now Towson University) in 1966, where she taught history for nearly thirty years, becoming a full Professor of History – a position she held until her retirement in 1995.

Jochens was instrumental in founding the Women’s Studies Program at Towson University, one of the earliest such programs in the country. She lectured extensively in both the United States and Europe, including an engagement at the Library of Congress.

In 1997–1999, Jochens was president of the Society for the Advancement of Scandinavian Studies. On retirement, she became professor emerita. Dividing her time between living in Baltimore and in Paris, she also "provided unique expertise and support to rising French scholars of medieval Scandinavia".

After her death in Baltimore in 2025, Jochens’ scholarly library was donated to Johns Hopkins University. She also helped establish a named professorship in the history department at Johns Hopkins after herself and her husband. In October 2015, the history department at Towson University held a conference in her honour, entitled “Goddesses, Queens, Valkyries, and Other Women in the Viking Age.” Her personal papers are archived at the National Archives of Denmark.

Jochens and Baldwin had four children, raised bilingual in English and Danish; according to Michael McCormick, they were "accomplished in the fields of modern European history (Peter Baldwin, UCLA); biology (Ian T. Baldwin, Director, Max Planck Institute for Chemical Ecology); information technology (Christopher Baldwin); and, incipiently, comparative literature. Their gifted daughter, Birgit Baldwin, was completing a dissertation in that field at Yale when she was killed by a drunk driver in 1988". Jochens and her family established a number of academic grants in Birgit's memory: the Birgit Baldwin Fellowship in French Medieval History, Birgit Baldwin Fellowship in Scandinavian Studies, and Birgit Baldwin Professorship at Yale University.

== Works ==
Jochens' main works were:

- Jochens, Jenny (1996). Old Norse images of women. Philadelphia: University of Pennsylvania press. ISBN 978-0-8122-3358-2.
- Jochens, Jenny (1995). Women in Old Norse society. Ithaca: Cornell University Press. ISBN 978-0-8014-5595-7.
- Florschuetz, Thomas; Schreier, Christoph; Gisbourne, Mark; Fioretos, Aris (2004). Are you talking to me? =: Sprichst du mit mir?. Städtisches Kunstmuseum Bonn (1. Aufl ed.). Göttingen: Steidl. ISBN 978-3-86521-006-7.
