= Nectar =

Sugar-rich liquid produced by plants

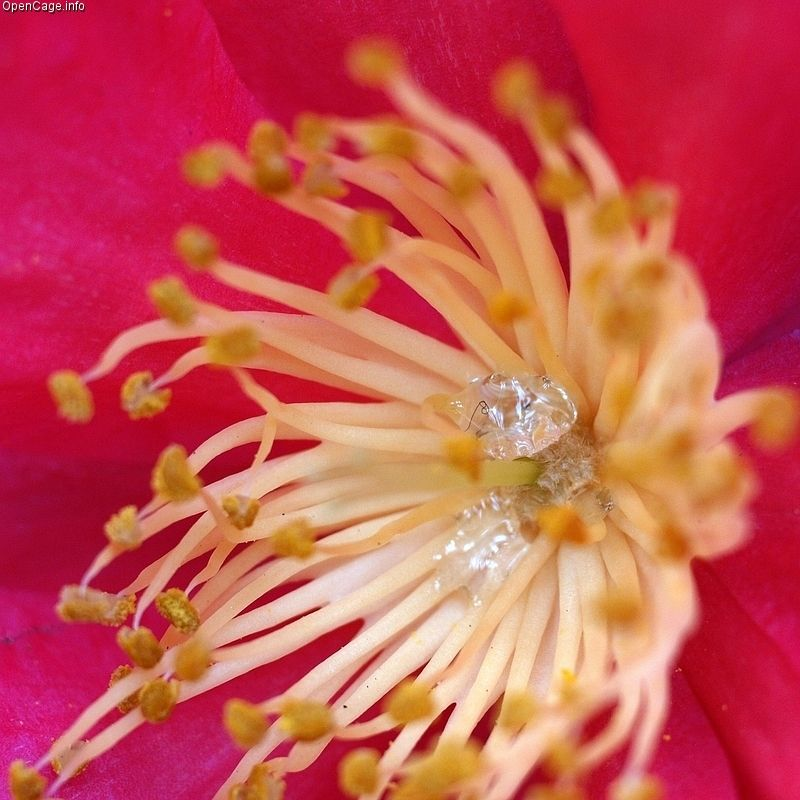
Nectar of camellia

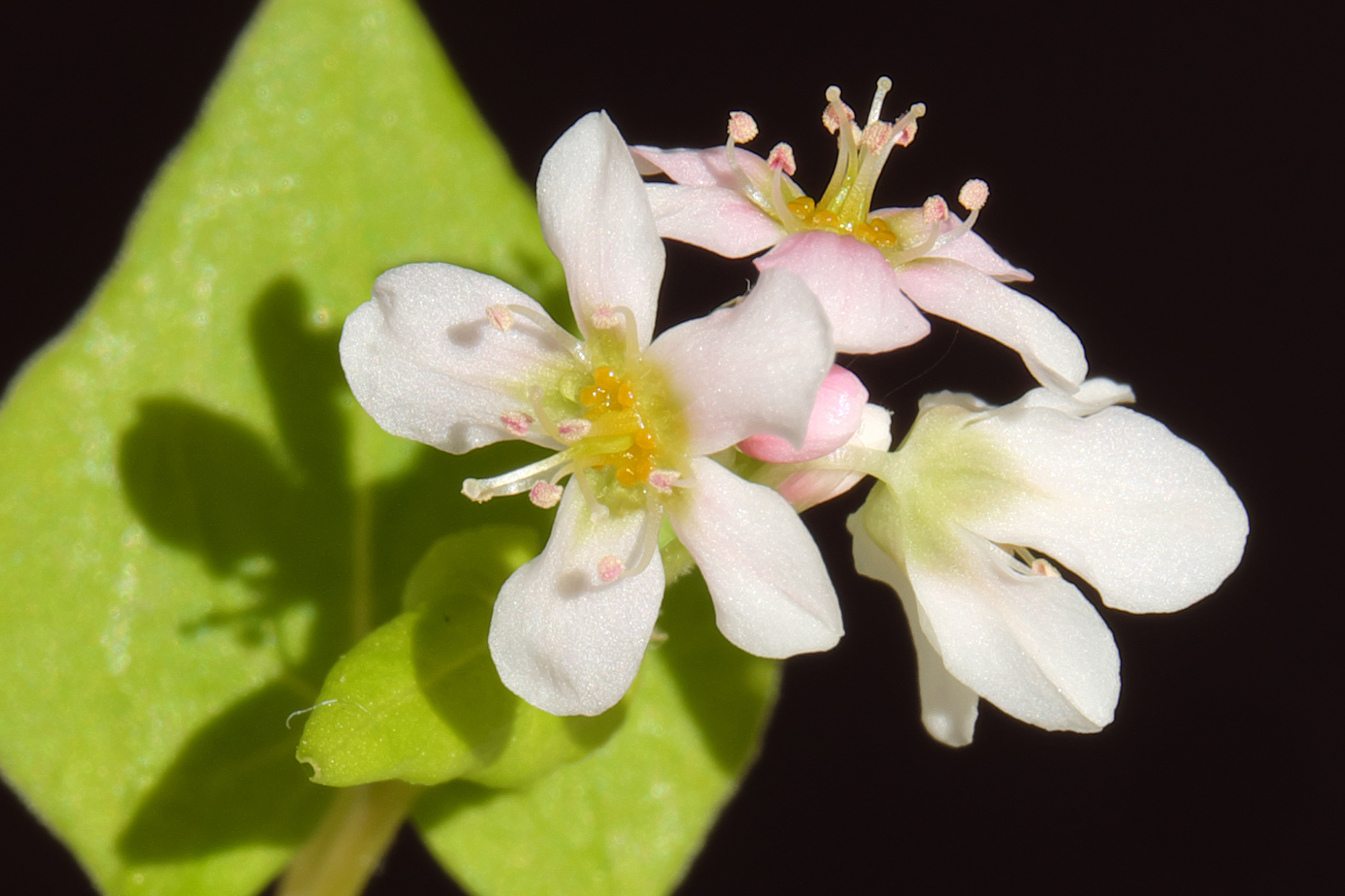
Orange-yellow nectaries and greenish nectar in buckwheat flowers

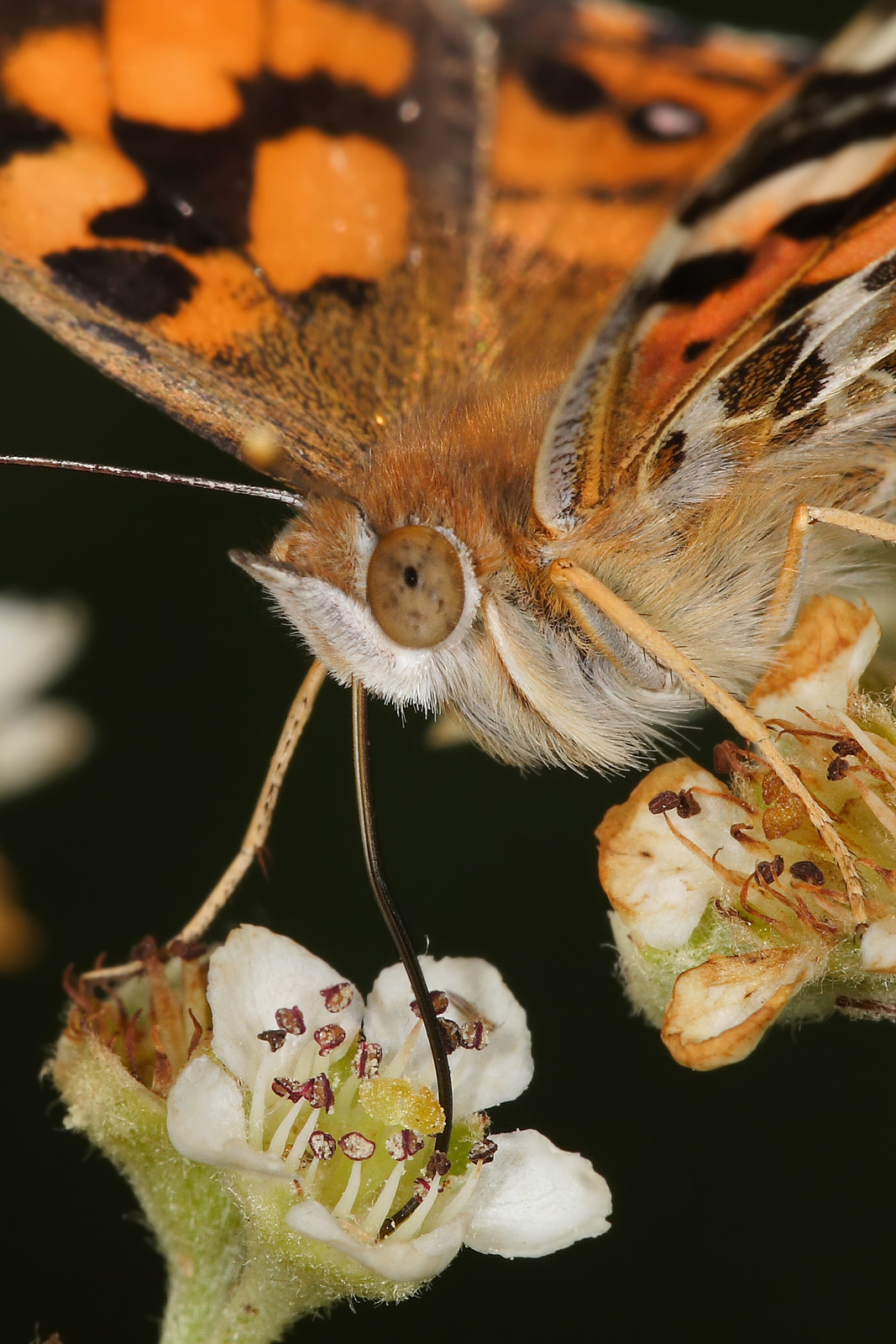
An Australian painted lady feeding on a flower's nectar

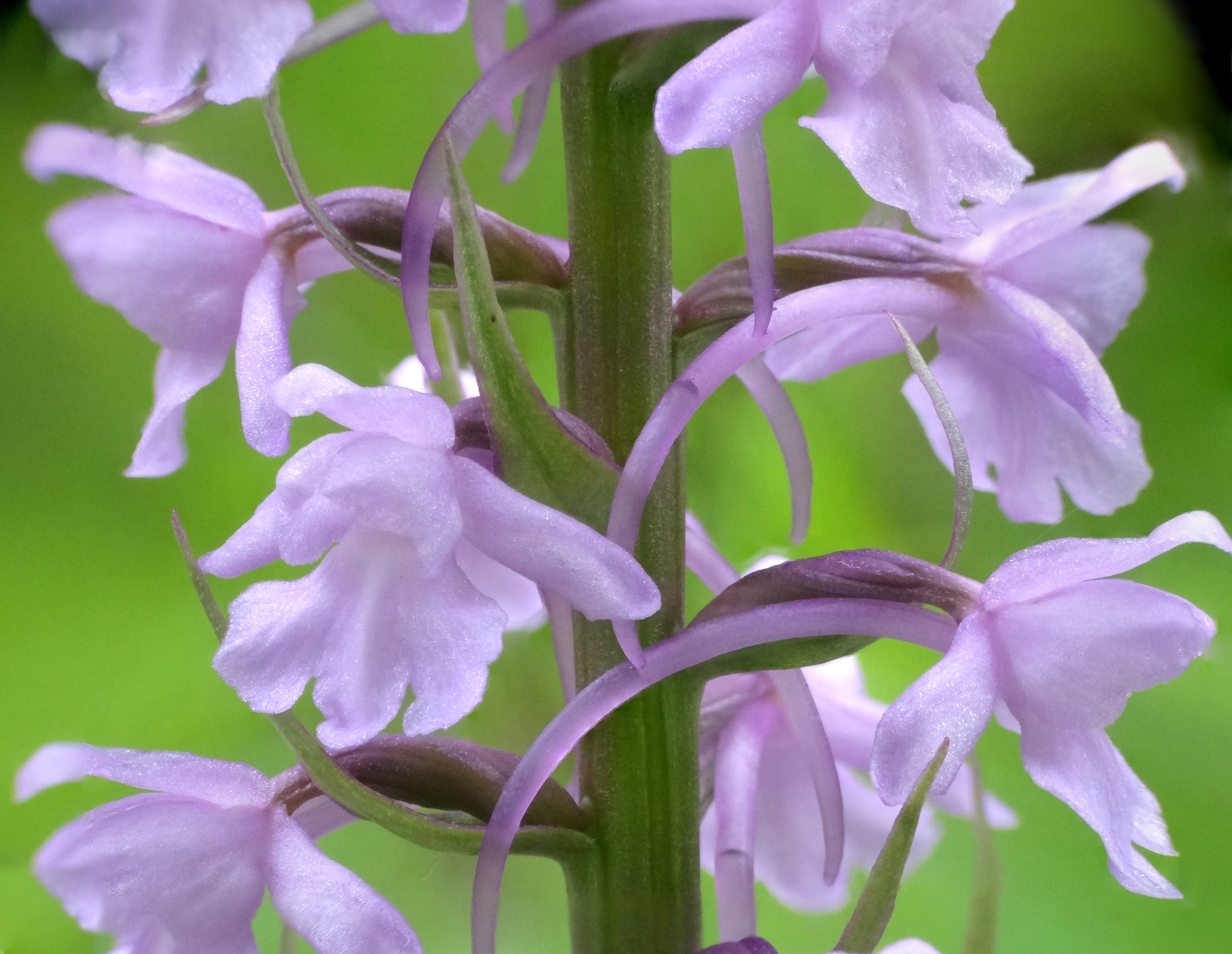
Gymnadenia conopsea flowers with nectar-filled spur

Nectar is a viscous, sugar-rich liquid produced by glands in plants called nectaries, either within the flowers with which it attracts pollinating animals, or by extrafloral nectaries, which provide a nutrient source to animal mutualists, which in turn provide herbivore protection. Common nectar-consuming pollinators include mosquitoes, hoverflies, wasps, bees, butterflies and moths, hummingbirds, honeyeaters and bats. Nectar is an economically important substance as it is the sugar source for honey.

Nectar is also useful in agriculture and horticulture because the adult stages of some predatory insects feed on nectar. For example, a number of predacious or parasitoid wasps (e.g., the social wasp species Apoica flavissima) rely on nectar as a primary food source. In turn, these wasps then hunt agricultural pest insects as food for their young.

Nectar is most often associated with flowering plants (angiosperms), but it is also produced by other groups, including ferns.

== Etymology ==
Nectar is derived from Greek νέκταρ, the fabled drink of eternal life. Some derive the word from νε- or νη- "not" plus κτα- or κτεν- "kill", meaning "unkillable", thus "immortal". The common use of the word "nectar" to refer to the "sweet liquid in flowers", is first recorded in AD 1600.

== Floral nectaries ==
A nectary or honey gland is floral tissue found in different locations in the flower and is one of several secretory floral structures, including elaiophores and osmophores, producing nectar, oil, and scent respectively. The function of these structures is to attract potential pollinators, which may include insects, including bees and moths, and vertebrates such as hummingbirds and bats. Nectaries can occur on any floral part, but they may also represent a modified part or a novel structure. The different types of floral nectaries include:

- receptacle (receptacular: extrastaminal, intrastaminal, interstaminal)
- hypanthium (hypanthial)
- tepals (perigonal, tepal)
- sepals (sepal)
- petal (petal, corolla)
- stamen (staminal, androecial: filament, anther, staminodal)
- pistil (gynoecial: stigmatic, stylar)
  - pistillodes (pistillodal, carpellodial)
  - ovaries (ovarian: non-septal, septal, gynopleural)

Most members of Lamiaceae have a nectariferous disc which surrounds the ovary base and derived from developing ovarian tissue. In most Brassicaceae, the nectary is at the base of the stamen filament. Many monocotyledons have septal nectaries, which are at the unfused margins of the carpels. These exude nectar from small pores on the surface of the gynoecium. Nectaries may also vary in color, number, and symmetry. Nectaries can also be categorized as structural or non-structural. Structural nectaries refer to specific areas of tissue that exude nectar, such as the types of floral nectaries previously listed. Non-structural nectaries secrete nectar infrequently from non-differentiated tissues. The different types of floral nectaries coevolved depending on the pollinator that feeds on the plant's nectar. Nectar is secreted from epidermal cells of the nectaries, which have a dense cytoplasm, by means of trichomes or modified stomata. Adjacent vascular tissue conducts phloem bringing sugars to the secretory region, where it is secreted from the cells through vesicles packaged by the endoplasmic reticulum. The adjacent subepidermal cells may also be secretory. Flowers that have longer nectaries sometimes have a vascular strand in the nectary to assist in transport over a longer distance.

Pollinators feed on the nectar and depending on the location of the nectary the pollinator assists in fertilization and outcrossing of the plant as they brush against the reproductive organs, the stamen and pistil, of the plant and pick up or deposit pollen. Nectar from floral nectaries is sometimes used as a reward to insects, such as ants, that protect the plant from predators. Many floral families have evolved a nectar spur. These spurs are projections of various lengths formed from different tissues, such as the petals or sepals. They allow for pollinators to land on the elongated tissue and more easily reach the nectaries and obtain the nectar reward. Different characteristics of the spur, such as its length or position in the flower, may determine the type of pollinator that visits the flower.

Defense from herbivory is often one of the roles of extrafloral nectaries. Floral nectaries can also be involved in defense. In addition to the sugars found in nectar, certain proteins may also be found in nectar secreted by floral nectaries. In tobacco plants, these proteins have antimicrobial and antifungal properties and can be secreted to defend the gynoecium from certain pathogens.

Floral nectaries have evolved and diverged into the different types of nectaries due to the various pollinators that visit the flowers. In Melastomataceae, different types of floral nectaries have evolved and been lost many times. Flowers that ancestrally produced nectar and had nectaries may have lost their ability to produce nectar due to a lack of nectar consumption by pollinators, such as certain species of bees. Instead they focused on energy allocation to pollen production. Species of angiosperms that have nectaries use the nectar to attract pollinators that consume the nectar, such as birds and butterflies. In Bromeliaceae, septal nectaries (a form of gynoecial nectary) are common in species that are insect or bird pollinated. In species that are wind pollinated, nectaries are often absent because there is no pollinator. In flowers that are generally pollinated by a long-tongued organism such as certain flies, moths, butterflies, and birds, nectaries in the ovaries are common because they are able to reach the nectar reward when pollinating. Sepal and petal nectaries are often more common in species that are pollinated by short-tongued insects that cannot reach so far into the flower.

=== Secretion ===
Nectar secretion increases as the flower is visited by pollinators. After pollination, the nectar is frequently reabsorbed into the plant. The amount of nectar in flowers at any given time is variable due to many factors, including flower age, plant location, and habitat management.

== Extrafloral nectaries ==
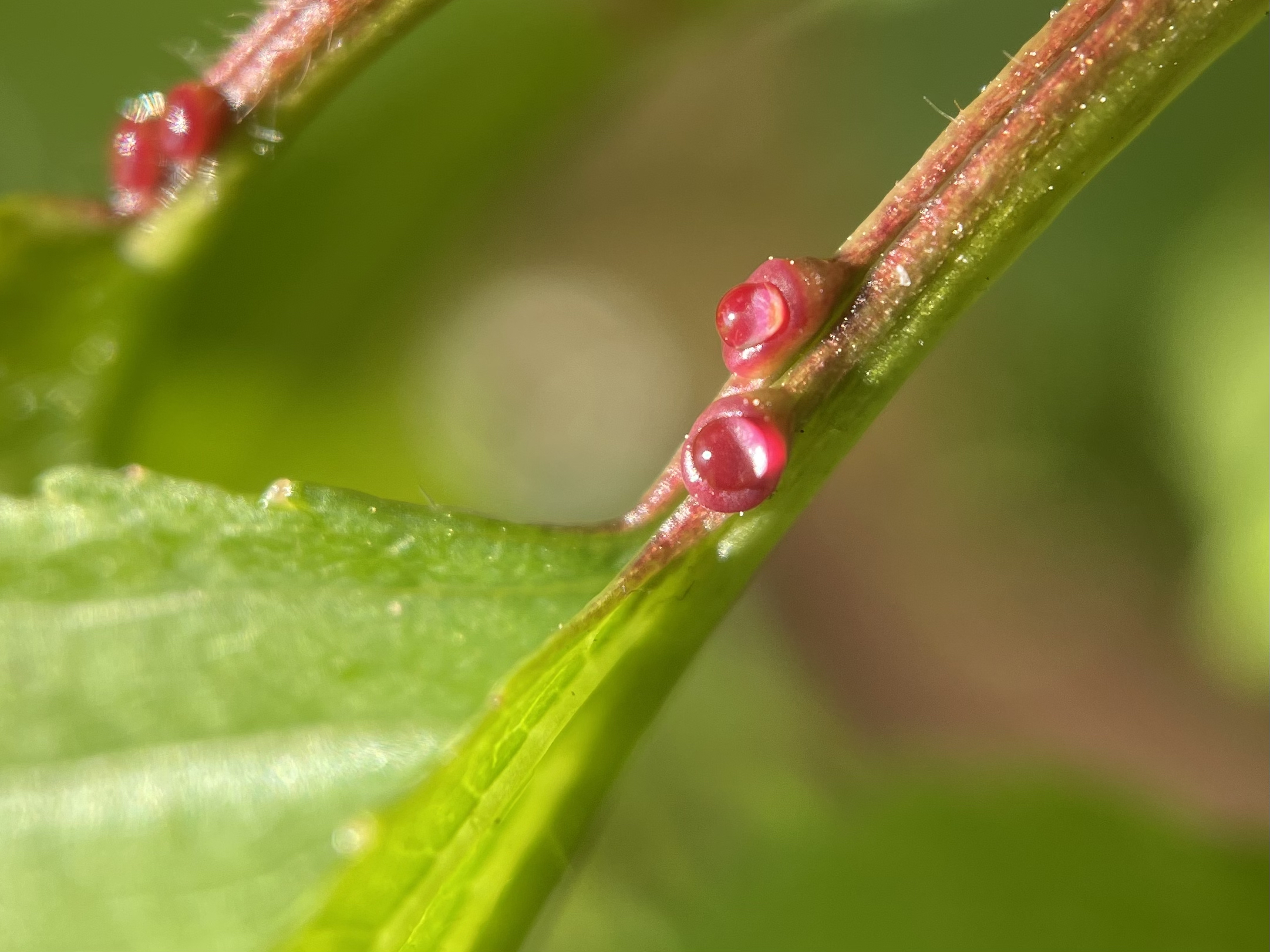
Extrafloral nectaries with droplets of nectar on the petiole of a wild cherry (Prunus avium) leaf

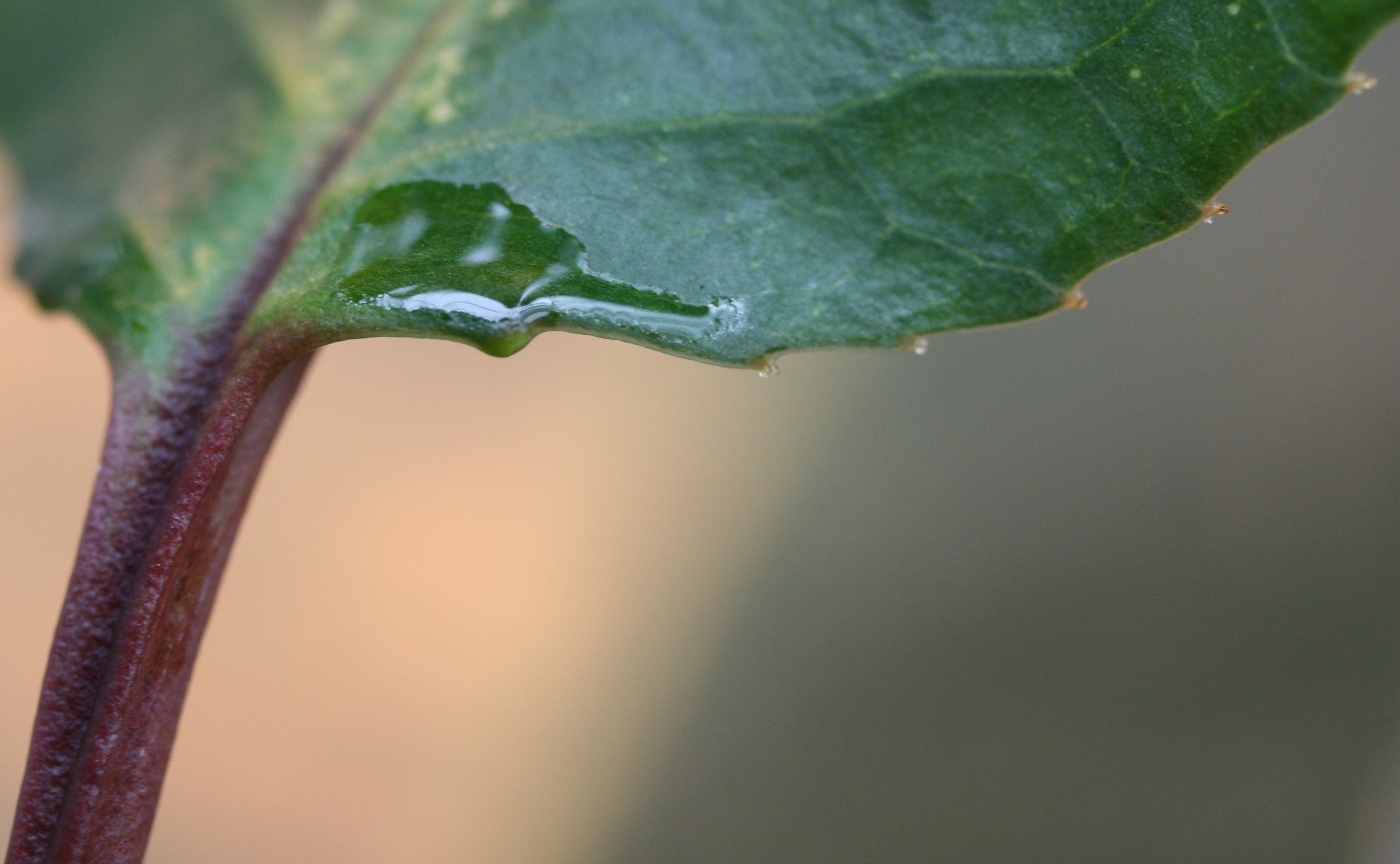
Extrafloral nectaries on a red stinkwood (Prunus africana) leaf

Extrafloral nectaries (also known as extranuptial nectaries) are specialised nectar-secreting plant glands that develop outside of flowers and are not involved in pollination, generally on the leaf or petiole (foliar nectaries) and often in relation to the leaf venation. They are highly diverse in form, location, size, and mechanism. They have been described in virtually all above-ground plant parts—including stipules, cotyledons, fruits, and stems, among others. They range from single-celled trichomes to complex cup-like structures that may or may not be vascularized. Like floral nectaries, they consist of groups of glandular trichomes (e.g., Hibiscus spp.) or elongated secretory epidermal cells. The latter are often associated with underlying vascular tissue. They may be associated with specialised pockets (domatia), pits or raised regions (e.g., Euphorbiaceae). The leaves of some tropical eudicots (e.g., Fabaceae) and magnoliids (e.g., Piperaceae) possess pearl glands or bodies which are globular trichomes specialised to attract ants. They secrete matter that is particularly rich in carbohydrates, proteins and lipids.

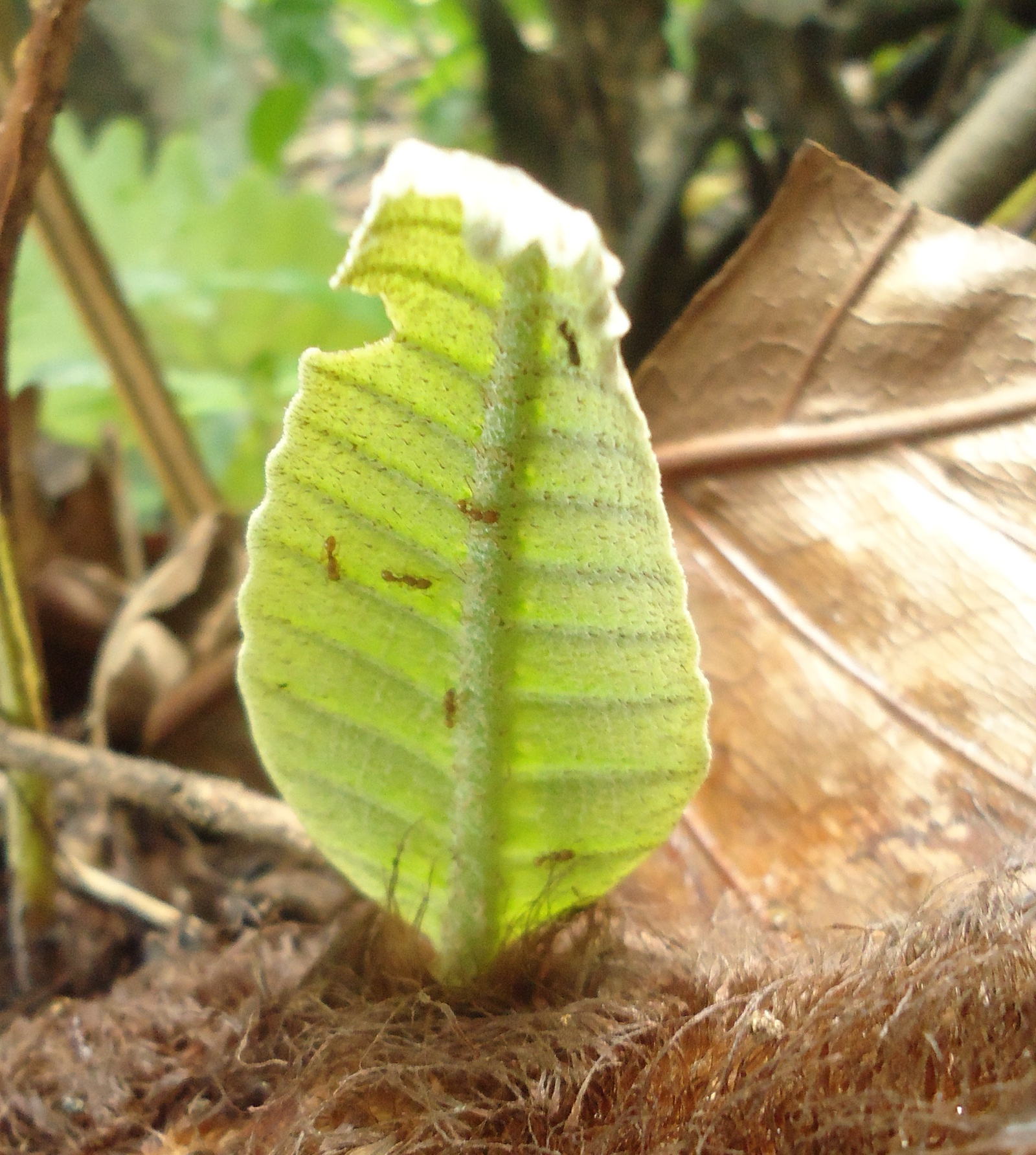
Ants on extrafloral nectaries in the lower surface of a young Drynaria quercifolia frond

While their function is not always clear, and may be related to regulation of sugars, in most cases they appear to facilitate plant insect relationships. In contrast to floral nectaries, nectar produced outside the flower generally has a defensive function. The nectar attracts predatory insects which will eat both the nectar and any plant-eating insects around, thus functioning as "bodyguards". Foraging predatory insects show a preference for plants with extrafloral nectaries, particularly some species of ants and wasps, which have been observed to defend the plants bearing them. Acacia is one example of a plant whose nectaries attract ants, which protect the plant from other insect herbivores. Among passion flowers, for example, extrafloral nectaries reduce herbivory by attracting ants, and by deterring two species of butterflies from laying eggs. In many carnivorous plants, extrafloral nectaries are also used to attract insect prey.

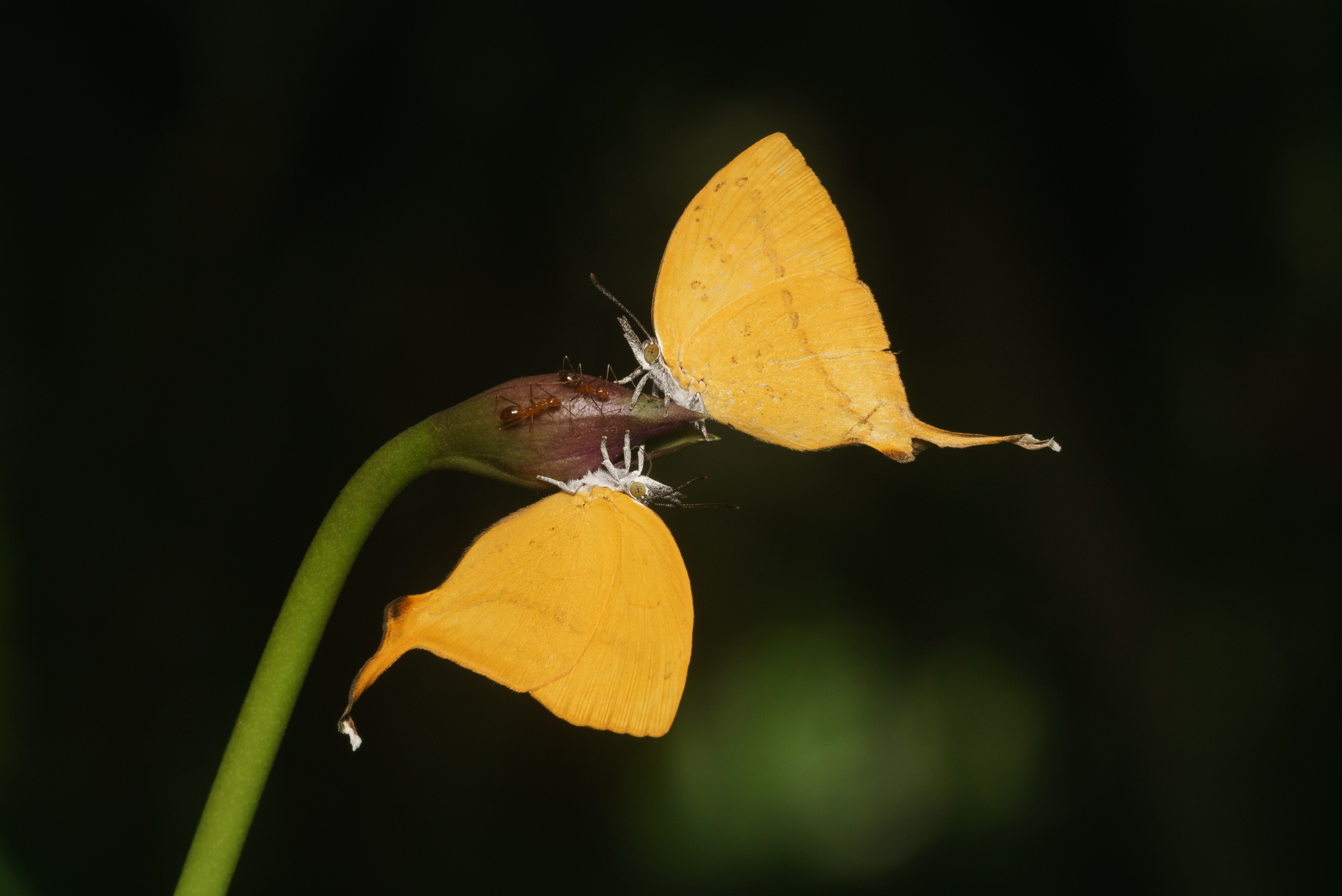
Loxura atymnus butterflies and yellow crazy ants consuming nectar secreted from the extrafloral nectaries of a Spathoglottis plicata bud

Charles Darwin understood that extrafloral nectar "though small in quantity, is greedily sought by insects" but believed that "their visits do not in any way benefit the plant". Instead, he believed that extrafloral nectaries were excretory in nature (hydathodes). Their defensive functions were first recognized by the Italian botanist Federico Delpino in his important monograph Funzione mirmecofila nel regno vegetale (1886). Delpino's study was inspired by a disagreement with Darwin, with whom he corresponded regularly.

Extrafloral nectaries have been reported in over 3941 species of vascular plants belonging to 745 genera and 108 families, 99.7% of which belong to flowering plants (angiosperms), comprising 1.0 to 1.8% of all known species. They are most common among eudicots, occurring in 3642 species (of 654 genera and 89 families), particularly among rosids which comprise more than half of the known occurrences. The families showing the most recorded occurrences of extrafloral nectaries are Fabaceae, with 1069 species, Passifloraceae, with 438 species, and Malvaceae, with 301 species. The genera with the most recorded occurrences are Passiflora (322 species, Passifloraceae), Inga (294 species, Fabaceae), and Acacia (204 species, Fabaceae). Other genera with extrafloral nectaries include Salix (Salicaceae), Prunus (Rosaceae), and Gossypium (Malvaceae).

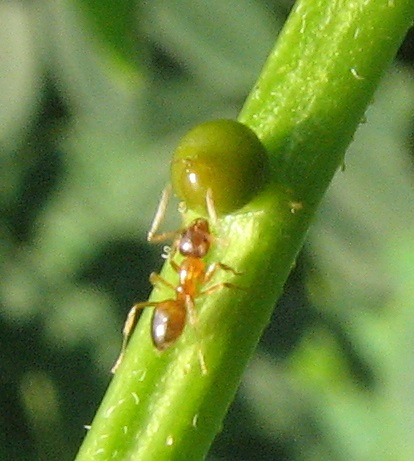
Nylanderia flavipes ant visiting extrafloral nectaries of Senna

Foliar nectaries have also been observed in 101 species of ferns, belonging to eleven genera and six families, most of them belonging to Cyatheales (tree ferns) and Polypodiales. Fern nectaries appear to have evolved around 135 million years ago, nearly simultaneously with angiosperms. However, fern nectaries did not diversify remarkably until nearly 100 million years later, in the Cenozoic, with weak support for a role played by arthropod herbivore diversifications. They are absent in bryophytes, gymnosperms, early angiosperms, magnoliids, and members of Apiales among the eudicots. Phylogenetic studies and the wide distribution of extrafloral nectaries among vascular plants point to multiple independent evolutionary origins of extrafloral nectaries in at least 457 independent lineages.

== Components ==
The main ingredients in nectar are sugars in varying proportions of sucrose, glucose, and fructose. In addition, nectars have diverse other phytochemicals serving to both attract pollinators and discourage predators. Carbohydrates, amino acids, and volatiles function to attract some species, whereas alkaloids and polyphenols appear to provide a protective function. The Nicotiana attenuata, a tobacco plant native to the US state of Utah, uses several volatile aromas to attract pollinating birds and moths. The strongest such aroma is benzylacetone, but the plant also adds bitter nicotine, which is less aromatic, so may not be detected by the bird until after taking a drink. Researchers speculate the purpose of this addition is to discourage the forager after only a sip, motivating it to visit other plants, therefore maximizing the pollination efficiency gained by the plant for a minimum nectar output. Neurotoxins such as aesculin are present in some nectars such as that of the California buckeye. Nectar contains water, essential oils, carbohydrates, amino acids, ions, and numerous other compounds.

== Similar attractive substances ==
Some insect pollinated plants lack nectaries, but attract pollinators through other secretory structures. Elaiophores are similar to nectaries but are oil secreting. Osmophores are modified structural structures that produce volatile scents. In orchids, these have pheromone qualities. Osmophores have thick domed or papillate epidermis and dense cytoplasm. Platanthera bifolia produces a nocturnal scent from the labellum epidermis. Ophrys labella have dome-shaped, papillate, dark-staining epidermal cells forming osmophores. Narcissus emit pollinator specific volatiles from the corona.

== See also ==
- Nectar guide
- Nectar source
- Nectarivore
- Northern American nectar sources for honey bees

== Bibliography ==
Books

- Baker, H.G. and Baker, I. (1975) Studies of nectar-constitution and pollinator-plant coevolution. In Coevolution of animals and plants. Gilbert, L.E. and Raven, P.H. ed. Univ. of Texas Press, Austin, 100–140.
- Esau, K. (1977) Anatomy of seed plants. John Wiley & Sons, New York.
- Nicolson, Susan W.; Nepi, Massimo; Pacini, Ettore, eds. (2007). Nectaries and Nectar. Dordrecht: Springer Publications. ISBN 978-1-4020-5937-7.
- Roshchina, V.V. and Roshchina, V.D. (1993) The excretory function of higher plants. Springer-Verlag, Berlin.
- Rudall, Paula J. (2007). Anatomy of Flowering Plants: An Introduction to Structure and Development. Cambridge University Press. ISBN 978-1-139-45948-8.

Articles

- Baker, H.G.; Baker, I. (1973). "Amino acids in nectar and their evolutionary significance". Nature. 241 (5391): 543–545. Bibcode:1973Natur.241..543B. doi:10.1038/241543b0. S2CID 4298075.
- Baker, H.G. and Baker, I. (1981) Chemical constituents of nectar in relation to pollination mechanisms and phylogeny. In Biochemical aspects of evolutionary biology. 131–171.
- Beutler, R. (1935) Nectar. Bee World 24:106–116, 128–136, 156–162.
- Burquez, A.; Corbet, S.A. (1991). "Do flowers reabsorb nectar?". Funct. Ecol. 5 (3): 369–379. Bibcode:1991FuEco...5..369B. doi:10.2307/2389808. JSTOR 2389808.
- Carter, C.; Graham, R.; Thornburg, R.W. (1999). "Nectarin I is a novel, soluble germin-like protein expressed in the nectar of Nicotiana sp". Plant Mol. Biol. 41 (2): 207–216. doi:10.1023/A:1006363508648. PMID 10579488. S2CID 18327851.
- Deinzer, M.L.; Tomson, P.M.; Burgett, D.M.; Isaacson, D.L. (1977). "Pyrrolizidine alkaloids: Their occurrence in honey from tansy ragwort (Senecio jacobaea L.)". Science. 195 (4277): 497–499. Bibcode:1977Sci...195..497D. doi:10.1126/science.835011. PMID 835011.
- Ecroyd, C.E.; Franich, R.A.; Kroese, H.W.; Steward, D. (1995). "Volatile constituents of Dactylanthus taylorii flower nectar in relation to flower pollination and browsing by animals". Phytochemistry. 40 (5): 1387–1389. Bibcode:1995PChem..40.1387E. doi:10.1016/0031-9422(95)00403-t.
- Ferreres, Federico; Andrade, Paula; Gil, Maria I.; Tomás-Barberán, Francisco A. (1996). "Floral nectar phenolics as biochemical markers for the botanical origin of heather honey". Zeitschrift für Lebensmittel-Untersuchung und Forschung. 202 (1): 40–44. doi:10.1007/BF01229682. S2CID 84713582.
- Frey-Wyssling, A. (1955) The phloem supply to the nectaries. Acta Bot. Neerl. 4:358–369.
- Griebel, C.; Hess, G. (1940). "Der C-Vitamingehalt des Blütennektars bestimmter Labiaten". Zeitschrift für Untersuchung der Lebensmittel. 79 (1–2): 168–171. doi:10.1007/BF01662427.
- Heinrich, G (1989). "Analysis of cations in nectars by means of a laser microprobe mass analyser (LAMMA)". Beitr. Biol. Pflanz. 64: 293–308.
- Heslop-Harrison, Y.; Knox, R.B. (1971). "A cytochemical study of the leaf-gland enzymes of insectivorus plants of the genusPinguicula". Planta. 96 (3): 183–211. Bibcode:1971Plant..96..183H. doi:10.1007/bf00387439. PMID 24493118. S2CID 24535933.
- Jeiter, Julius; Hilger, Hartmut H; Smets, Erik F; Weigend, Maximilian (November 2017). "The relationship between nectaries and floral architecture: a case study in Geraniaceae and Hypseocharitaceae". Annals of Botany. 120 (5): 791–803. doi:10.1093/aob/mcx101. PMC 5691401. PMID 28961907.
- Park, Sanggyu; Thornburg, Robert W. (27 January 2009). "Biochemistry of Nectar Proteins". Journal of Plant Biology. 52 (1): 27–34. Bibcode:2009JPBio..52...27P. doi:10.1007/s12374-008-9007-5. S2CID 9157748.
- Peumans, W.J.; Smeets, K.; Van Nerum, K.; Van Leuven, F.; Van Damme, E.J.M. (1997). "Lectin and alliinase are the predominant proteins in nectar from leek (Allium porrum L.) flowers". Planta. 201 (3): 298–302. Bibcode:1997Plant.201..298P. doi:10.1007/s004250050070. PMID 9129337. S2CID 28957910.
- Rodríguez-Arce, Angel L.; Díaz, Noemi (April 1992). "THE STABILITY OF β-CAROTENE IN MANGO NECTAR". The Journal of Agriculture of the University of Puerto Rico. 76 (2): 101–102. doi:10.46429/jaupr.v76i2.4139. S2CID 247606388.
- Scala, J.; Iott, K.; Schwab, W.; Semersky, F.E. (1969). "Digestive secretion of Dionaea muscipula (Venus's-Flytrap)". Plant Physiol. 44 (3): 367–371. doi:10.1104/pp.44.3.367. PMC 396093. PMID 16657071.
- Smith, L.L.; Lanza, J.; Smith, G.C. (1990). "Amino acid concentrations in extrafloral nectar of Impatiens sultani increase after simulated herbivory". Ecol. Publ. Ecol. Soc. Am. 71 (1): 107–115. Bibcode:1990Ecol...71..107S. doi:10.2307/1940251. JSTOR 1940251.
- Vogel, S. (1969) Flowers offering fatty oil instead of nectar. Abstracts XIth Internatl. Bot. Congr. Seattle.

Websites

- Thornburg, Robert (4 June 2001). "Nectar". Nectary Gene Expression Index. Department of Biochemistry, Biophysics and Molecular Biology, Iowa State University. Archived from the original on 10 September 2003.
