= Ian T. Baldwin =

American ecologist

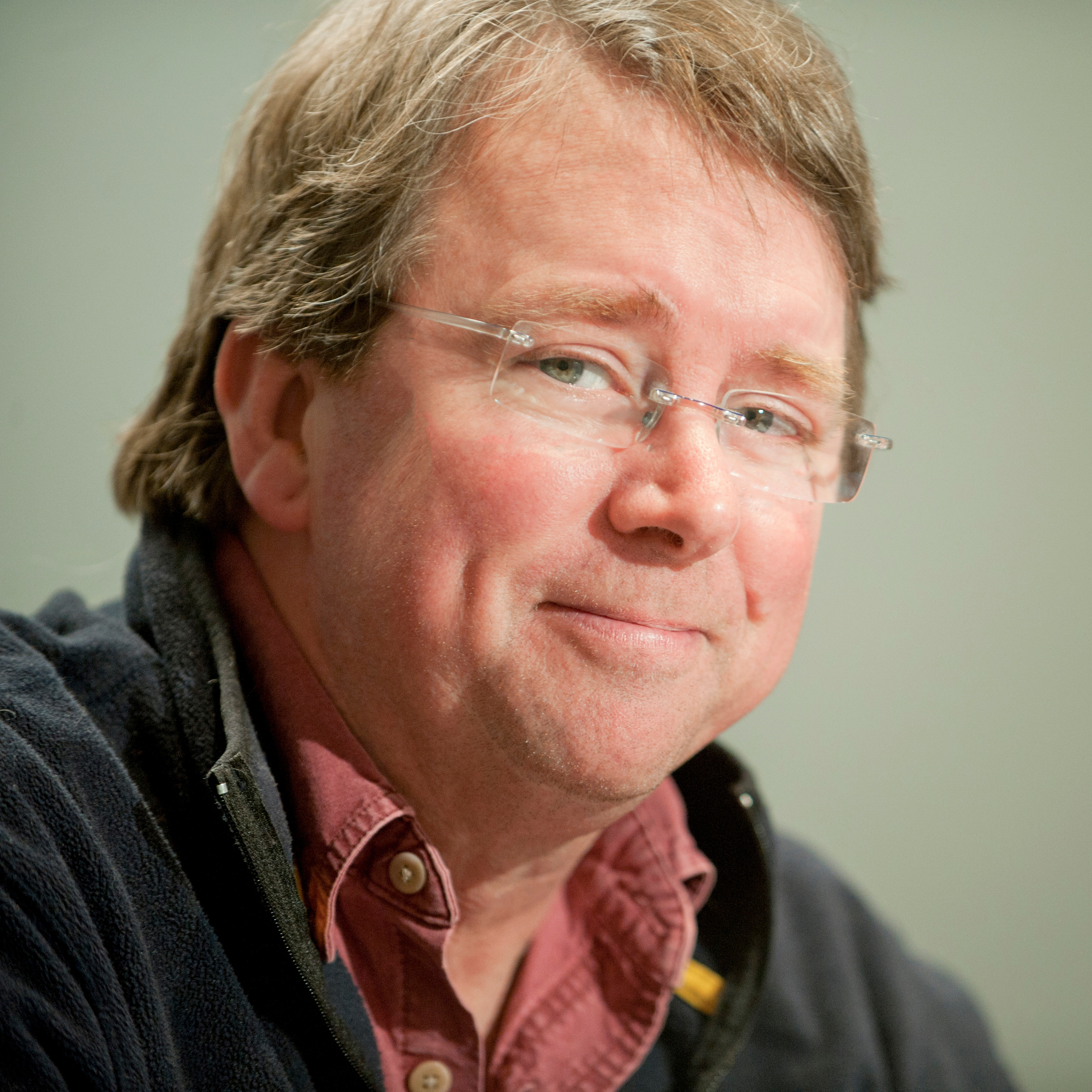
Ian Baldwin

Ian Thomas Baldwin (born 1958) is an American ecologist.

== Early life ==
Baldwin's parents were the medieval historians Jenny Jochens and John W. Baldwin.

== Scientific career ==
Baldwin studied biology and chemistry at Dartmouth College in Hanover, New Hampshire, and graduated 1981 with an AB. In 1989 he graduated with a PhD in chemical ecology from Cornell University, Ithaca, New York, Section of Neurobiology and Behavior. He was an Assistant (1989), Associate (1993) and Full Professor (1996) in the Department of Biology at SUNY Buffalo. In 1996 he became the Founding Director of the Max Planck Institute for Chemical Ecology where he heads the Department of Molecular Ecology. In 1999 he was appointed Honorary Professor at Friedrich Schiller University in Jena, Germany. In 2002 he founded the International Max Planck Research School at the Max Planck Institute in Jena.

Baldwin's scientific work is devoted to understanding the traits that allow plants to survive in the real world. To achieve this, he has developed a molecular toolbox for the native tobacco, Nicotiana attenuata (coyote tobacco), and a graduate program that trains "genome-enabled field biologists" to combine genomic and molecular genetic tools with field work to understand the genes that matter for plant-herbivore, -pollinator, -plant, -microbial interactions in nature. He has been a driver behind the Open Access publication efforts of the Max Planck Society and is one of the senior editors of the open access journal eLife. Since November 2020, the Department of Molecular Ecology is led by Acting Director Sarah O’Connor. The former Director Ian Baldwin now serves as Leader of the Research Group of a Scientific Member of the Max Planck Society (FG WiMi, Forschungsgruppe Wissenschaftliches Mitglied) and he continues his research at the Institute in this role.

== Awards and honors ==
- Presidential Young Investigator Award 1991
- Silverstein-Simeone Award of the International Society of Chemical Ecology 1998
- Extraordinary member of the Berlin-Brandenburg Academy of Sciences and Humanities (since 2001)
- Tansley Lecture, British Ecological Society, 2009
- European Research Council (ERC) Advanced Grant 2011
- Elected Member of the National Academy of Sciences 2013
- Elected Member of the German Academy of Sciences Leopoldina 2013
- Elected Member of the European Molecular Biology Organization EMBO
- International Award of the Jean-Marie Delwart Foundation 2014
- Elected Fellow of the American Association for the Advancement of Science 2016

== Selected publications ==
- Schultz, J. C., Baldwin, I. T. (1982): Oak leaf quality declines in response to defoliation by Gypsy moth larvae. Science, 217, 149–151.doi:10.1126/science.217.4555.149
- Karban, R., Baldwin, I. T. (1997): Induced responses to herbivory. Chicago: Univ. of Chicago Press. ISBN 978-0-226-42496-5
- Kessler, A., Baldwin, I. T. (2001): Defensive function of herbivore-induced plant volatile emissions in nature. Science, 291(5511), 2141–2144.doi:10.1126/science.291.5511.2141
- Kessler, A., Halitschke, R., Baldwin, I. T. (2004): Silencing the jasmonate cascade: Induced plant defenses and insect populations. Science, 305(5684), 665–668.doi:10.1126/science.1096931
- Baldwin, I. T., Halitschke, R., Paschold, A., von Dahl, C. C., Preston, C. A. (2006): Volatile signaling in plant-plant interactions: "Talking trees" in the genomics era. Science, 311(5762), 812–815.doi:10.1126/science.1118446
- Kessler, D., Gase, K., Baldwin, I. T. (2008): Field experiments with transformed plants reveal the sense of floral scents. Science, 321(5893), 1200–1202.doi:10.1126/science.1160072
- Kessler, D., Diezel, C., Baldwin, I. T. (2010): Changing pollinators as a means of escaping herbivores. Current Biology, 20, 237–242.doi:10.1016/j.cub.2009.11.071
- Allmann, S., Baldwin, I. T. (2010): Insects betray themselves in nature to predators by rapid isomerization of green leaf volatiles. Science, 329, 1075–1078.doi:10.1126/science.1191634
- Weinhold, A., Baldwin I.T. (2011): Trichome-derived O-acyl sugars are a first meal for caterpillars that tags them for predation. Proceedings of the National Academy of Sciences of the United States of America, 108(19), 7855–7859. doi:10.1073/pnas.1101306108
- Kumar, P., Pandit, S. S., Steppuhn, A., Baldwin, I. T. (2014). A natural history driven, plant mediated RNAi based study reveals CYP6B46’s role in a nicotine-mediated anti-predator herbivore defense. Proceedings of the National Academy of Sciences of the United States of America, 111(4), 1245–1252. doi:10.1073/pnas.1314848111

== Video ==
- Video on Ian T. Baldwin's research (Latest Thinking)
