= Benzylideneacetone =

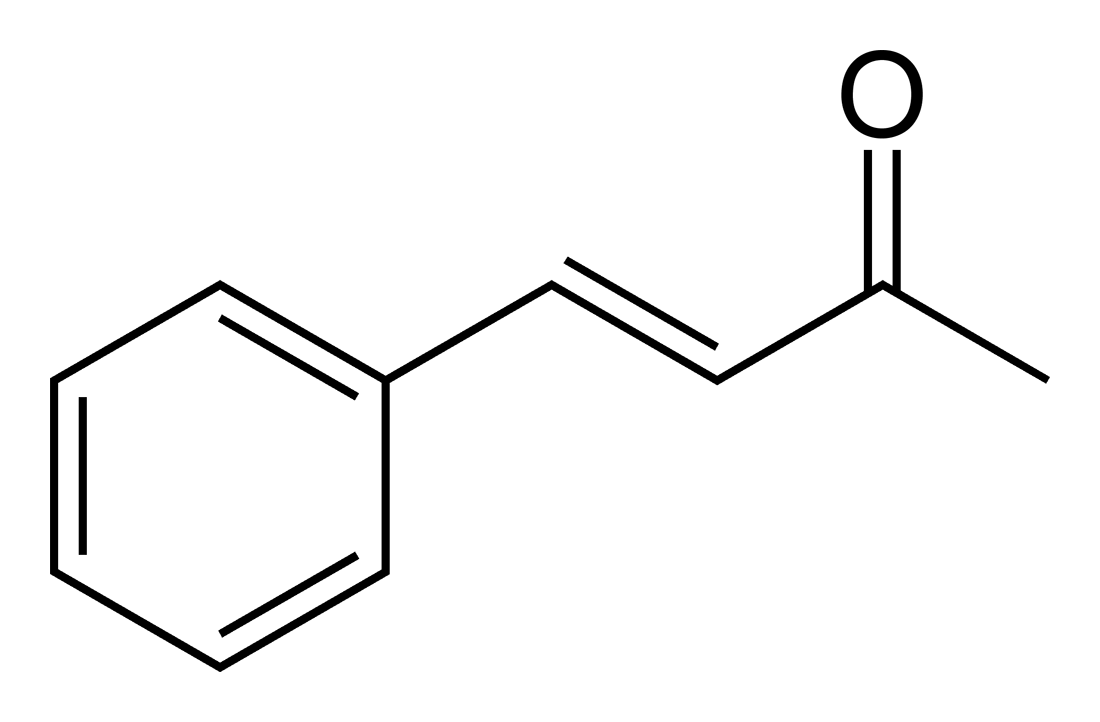

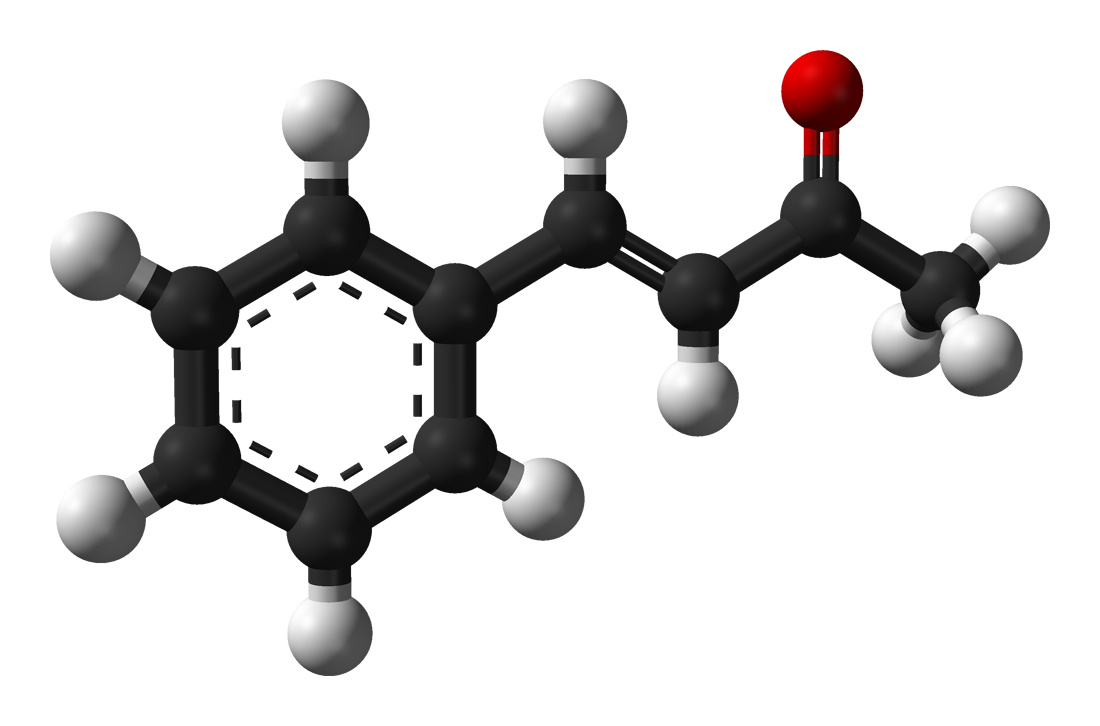

Names
- Preferred IUPAC name (3E)-4-Phenylbut-3-en-2-one
- Other names Benzalacetone; Benzylideneacetone; Methyl styryl ketone Benzylidene acetone

Identifiers
CAS Number	racemic: 122-57-6; Z (cis): 937-53-1; E (trans): 1896-62-4
3D model (JSmol)	racemic: Interactive image
ChEBI	racemic: CHEBI:217301
ChEMBL	racemic: ChEMBL73639
ChemSpider	racemic: 21106584
ECHA InfoCard	100.015.989
EC Number	racemic: 204-555-1; E (trans): 217-587-6
PubChem CID	Z (cis): 11147801; E (trans): 637759
RTECS number	racemic: EN0330000
UNII	racemic: 3M64PY48B9; Z (cis): B03X40BMT5
CompTox Dashboard (EPA)	racemic: DTXSID1031626
- InChI: InChI=1S/C10H10O/c1-9(11)7-8-10-5-3-2-4-6-10/h2-8H,1H3/b8-7+ Key: BWHOZHOGCMHOBV-BQYQJAHWSA-N; racemic: InChI=1/C10H10O/c1-9(11)7-8-10-5-3-2-4-6-10/h2-8H,1H3/b8-7+ Key: BWHOZHOGCMHOBV-BQYQJAHWBQ
- SMILES: racemic: CC(=O)/C=C/c1ccccc1

Properties
Chemical formula	C_{10}H_{10}O
Molar mass	146.19 g/mol
Appearance	pale yellow solid
Density	1.008 g/cm^{3}
Melting point	39 to 42 °C (102 to 108 °F; 312 to 315 K)
Boiling point	260 to 262 °C (500 to 504 °F; 533 to 535 K)
Solubility in water	1.3 g/L
Solubility in other solvents	nonpolar solvents

Hazards
- Occupational safety and health (OHS/OSH)
Main hazards	irritant
- GHS labelling
Pictograms	(GHS07: Exclamation mark)
Signal word	Warning
Hazard statements	H315, H317, H319, H335
Precautionary statements	P261, P264, P271, P272, P280, P302+P352, P304+P340, P305+P351+P338, P312, P321, P332+P313, P333+P313, P337+P313, P362, P363, P403+P233, P405, P501
Flash point	116 °C (241 °F; 389 K)

Related compounds
Related compounds	Dibenzylideneacetone cinnamaldehyde
- Except where otherwise noted, data are given for materials in their standard state (at 25 °C [77 °F], 100 kPa). verify (what is ?) Infobox references

Benzylideneacetone is the organic compound described by the formula C_{6}H_{5}CH=CHC(O)CH_{3}. Although both cis- and trans-isomers are possible for the α,β-unsaturated ketone, only the trans isomer is observed. Its original preparation demonstrated the scope of condensation reactions to construct new, complex organic compounds. Benzylideneacetone is used as a flavouring ingredient in food and perfumes.

== Preparation ==
Benzylideneacetone can be efficiently prepared by the base-induced condensation of acetone and benzaldehyde:

CH_{3}C(O)CH_{3} + C_{6}H_{5}CHO → C_{6}H_{5}CH=CHC(O)CH_{3} + H_{2}O

However, the benzylideneacetone formed via this reaction can undergo another Claisen-Schmidt condensation with another molecule of benzaldehyde to form dibenzylideneacetone. Because relatively weak bases such as NaOH make very little of the enolate ion at equilibrium, there is still a lot of unreacted base left in the reaction mixture, which can go on and remove protons from the alpha carbon of benzylideneacetone, allowing it to undergo another Claisen-Schmidt condensation and make dibenzylideneacetone.

If, on the other hand, lithium diisopropylamide (LDA) is used as the base, all of the acetone will be deprotonated, making enolate ion quantitatively. Therefore, a more efficient, but more expense way to make benzylideneacetone is to combine equimolar amounts of LDA (in THF), acetone, and benzaldehyde.

== Reactions ==
As with most methyl ketones, benzylideneacetone is moderately acidic at the alpha position, and it can be readily deprotonated to form the corresponding enolate

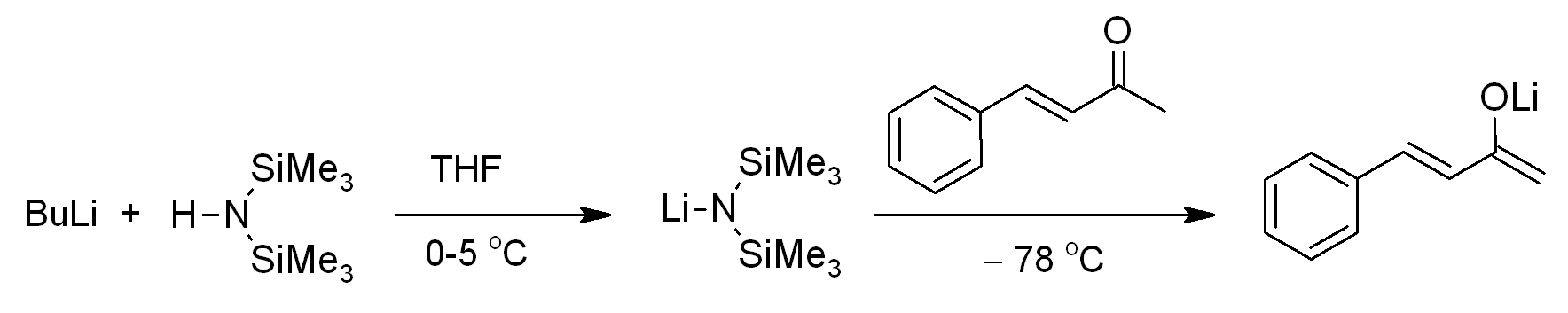

The compound undergoes the reactions expected for its collection of functional groups: e.g., the double bond adds bromine, the heterodiene adds electron-rich alkenes in Diels-Alder reactions to give dihydropyrans, the methyl group undergoes further condensation with benzaldehyde to give dibenzylideneacetone, and the carbonyl forms hydrazones. It reacts with Fe_{2}(CO)_{9} to give (benzylideneacetone)Fe(CO)_{3}, a reagent for transferring the Fe(CO)_{3} unit to other organic substrates.

- Hydrogenation of benzylideneacetone results in a preparation of benzylacetone.
- The reaction of 4-Hydroxycoumarin with this compound yields Warfarin.
