= Arcadia (Philanthropic Trust) =

UK charity

Arcadia Philanthropic Trust
- Formation: 2002; 24 years ago
- Founders: Peter Baldwin; Lisbet Rausing
- Purpose: Recording cultural heritage, conserving and restoring nature, and promoting open access to knowledge
- Headquarters: London, England, UK
- Region served: Worldwide
- Employees: 8
- Website: www.arcadiafund.org.uk

The Arcadia Philanthropic Trust is a charitable fund based in the UK founded by Lisbet Rausing and Peter Baldwin. Established in 2002, the organisation provides grants on a worldwide basis focusing on numerous projects outside the UK. The primary focus of the organisation is to help record cultural heritage, conserve and restore nature, and promote open access to knowledge.

Since 2002, the fund has provided more than $1.3 billion in projects around the world. According to the OECD, Arcadia's financing for 2023 development increased by 194.2% to US$121.4 million.

The trust has a donor board of five members and an advisory board of ten members.

== History ==
Since its inception, Arcadia Philanthropic Trust has awarded grants totaling $1.3 billion. It previously made grants for work to promote human rights and philanthropy, but today focuses on three funding areas: culture, nature and open access.

Its supported causes have been the preservation of endangered culture and nature and the provision of open access. The trust made its first grant in 2002 to the Endangered Languages Documentation Programme.

== Description ==
=== Culture ===
Arcadia's culture grants support digital documentation of cultural heritage that is poorly recorded and under threat. Arcadia's grants to the culture funding area totalled $388 million in February 2026. Example grants include:

Recipient	Title of Grant	Date of Grant	Value ($USD)	Description
Berlin-Brandenburgische Akademie der Wissenschaften	Endangered Languages Documentation Programme	2021	24,990,000	To support a grant programme to document languages which are at risk of extinction, and build a digital archive to make the results freely available online.
UCLA	Modern Endangered Archives Programme	2022	13,000,000	To support a grant programme to digitize endangered printed materials, manuscripts, photographs, audio-visual recordings and born-digital materials from the 20th and 21st centuries, and make the digitized materials freely available online.
University of Cambridge McDonald Institute for Archaeological Research	Mapping Africa's Endangered Archeological Sites and Monuments	2024	7,125,000	To carry out large-scale documentation of heritage sites in Sub-Saharan Africa and to make the results freely available online.
University of Oxford - School of Archaeology	Endangered Archaeology in the Middle East and North Africa	2024	2,750,000	To document endangered archaeological heritage in the Middle East and North Africa using satellite imagery and on-the-ground surveys and make the data freely available online.
Hill Museum and Manuscript Library	Digitization of Manuscripts in Africa and Asia	2021	5,492,813	To digitize endangered manuscripts in libraries in the Middle East, Africa and Asia and make them freely available online.
Wende Museum	Wende Endowment	2020	7,500,000	Towards a permanent endowment for the Wende Museum with proceeds specifically for collections care and acquisitions.

=== Nature ===
Arcadia’s nature grants support solutions to the global biodiversity and climate crises. Arcadia’s grants to the nature funding area totalled $614m in February 2026. Example grants include:

Recipient	Title of Grant	Date of Grant	Value ($USD)	Description
European Open Rivers Programme	European Open Rivers Programme	2021	50,575,000	To support a grant programme to remove redundant dams, weirs and other river barriers across Europe, so that rivers can flow naturally and biodiversity can flourish.
University of Cambridge – Cambridge Conservation Initiative	Endangered Landscapes & Seascapes Programme	2023	71,648,800	To support a grant programme to support large-scale projects to restore biodiversity-rich terrestrial and marine habitats across Europe at the Cambridge Conservation Initiative.
JournalismFund Europe	Earth Investigations Programme	2021	13,685,000	To support a grant programme for environmental investigative journalism on European affairs inside and outside Europe.
ClientEarth	Biodiversity and Habitat Governance	2023	6,250,000	To support ClientEarth’s work using legal systems to develop and enforce biodiversity and habitat governance.
Oceana Inc	Marine Wildlife Protection	2018	10,500,000	To influence policy that helps to protect and restore marine life and ecosystems in high biodiversity areas.
Oceans 5	Joint 30x30 Funding Initiative	2023	25,000,000	To support a joint grant programme with Bloomberg Philanthropies for work towards the target of protecting 30% of the world’s marine and coastal areas by 2030.

=== Open access ===
Arcadia’s open access grants help make information that “should legally and morally be free for anyone to access” available for free online. Arcadia’s grants to open access totalled $208m in December 2025. Example grants include:

Recipient	Title of Grant	Date of Grant	Value ($USD)	Description
Lancaster University	Open Book Futures	2023	3,429,600	To develop services and resources to support open-access book publishing by small-to-medium-sized publishers, non-profits and scholarly libraries.
Confederation of Open Access Repositories	Project Notify	2022	4,000,000	To help scholarly communities organise peer-review of preprints and working papers through a not-for-profit, university-governed ecosystem that bypasses commercial publishers.
Our Research	Tools to steer academic systems to open research	2021	4,500,000	To provide tools and data which make open-access research easier to find and use and to help libraries and researchers make better decisions.
Public.Resource.Org	Core funding	2020	5,000,000	To enable Public.Resource.Org to expand its work in three key areas: access to edicts of government, text and data mining and access to knowledge.
Massachusetts Institute of Technology	Arcadia Open Access Fund	2023	10,000,000	Towards a matched endowment to support open-access programmes at MIT Press, including open monographs, open journals and open publishing services.
Code for Science and Society	The IOI Fund for Network Adoption	2025	1,800,000	To establish a grant programme to fund networks that support open access to research.

=== Discretionary ===
The Arcadia Philanthropic Trust in 2015 provided $25 million to Yale University to renovate the Hall of Graduate Studies, enabling the university to co-locate the dispersed humanities departments under one roof to facilitate cross-disciplinary collaboration. Baldwin and Rausing have asked that the building should be named in tribute to the service of David Swensen (who built Yale's endowment from $1.3 billion to $23.9 billion) in tribute to his service.

Arcadia gave £5 million to the Illuminated River Foundation in 2017 for a commissioned art installation of light to 15 of Central London's bridges along the River Thames. When the project is completed, it would be the longest piece of commissioned art in the world at 2.5 miles long.

=== Discontinued themes ===
Before 2009 the Arcadia Philanthropic Trust was involved in supporting human rights. It supported organisations that helped refugee scholars, educated disadvantaged children in Africa, and conducted women's rights advocacy. In 2005, Arcadia provided a $5 million grant to the Mvule Trust to provide bursaries to young women in Uganda so they can go to secondary school. The grant and trust gave 75% of scholarships to girls and by 2007 and the trust had supported the education of 1,868 children.

Arcadia has provided a total of $6 million in 2005–2006 to the Human Rights Watch (US) to help their empirical research into persecution of women, and its fact gathering, press releases, advocacy and lobbying.

== Grant statistics and graphs ==
The following table breaks down Arcadia's largest grants and provides a description of the purpose of the grant.

Grants by Value ($USD)
Recipient	Title of Grant	Date of Grant	Value ($USD)	Type of Grant	Description of Grant
University of Cambridge	Endangered Landscapes & Seascapes Programme	2023	71,648,800	Nature	To support a grant programme to support large-scale projects to restore biodiversity-rich terrestrial and marine habitats across Europe at the Cambridge Conservation Initiative.
European Open Rivers Programme	European Open Rivers Programme	2021	50,750,000	Nature	To support a grant programme to remove redundant dams, weirs and other river barriers across Europe, so that rivers can flow naturally and biodiversity can flourish.
University of Cambridge	Cambridge Conservation Initiative: Endangered Landscapes Programme	2020	35,059,365	Nature	To support a grant programme to support large-scale projects to restore biodiversity-rich habitats across Europe at the Cambridge Conservation Initiative.
School of Oriental and African Studies	Endangered Languages Documentation Programme	2002	33,851,813	Cultural	To support a grant programme to document languages which are at risk of extinction, and build a digital archive to make the results freely available online.
University of Cambridge	Cambridge Conservation Initiative: Endangered Landscapes Programme	2018	31,441,100	Nature	To support a grant programme to support large-scale projects to restore biodiversity-rich habitats across Europe at the Cambridge Conservation Initiative.
Fauna & Flora International	Halcyon Programmes and core institutional support	2017	25,960,684	Nature	To provide core support for Fauna & Flora and support its work with local partners and communities to protect and restore important at-risk and biodiversity-rich natural habitats.
Legacy Landscapes Fund	Legacy Landscapes Fund match grants	2023	25,000,000	Nature	Match funding to create long-term endowments for the conservation of large landscapes centred on Chiribiquete (Colombia), Makira-Masoala (Madagascar) and Tambrauw (Indonesia).
Oceans 5	Joint 30x30 Funding Initiative	2023	25,000,000	Nature	To support a joint grant programme with Bloomberg Philanthropies for work towards the target of protecting 30% of the world’s marine and coastal areas by 2030.
Yale University	The Hall of Graduate Studies	2017	25,000,000	Discretionary	To refurbish the Hall of Graduate Studies and to support work to transform it into a centre for the humanities at Yale.
Yale University	Institute for the Preservation of Cultural Heritage	2011	25,000,000	Cultural	To build a new cultural heritage conservation and digitization centre at Yale University.
