= Peter Baldwin (professor) =

American historian

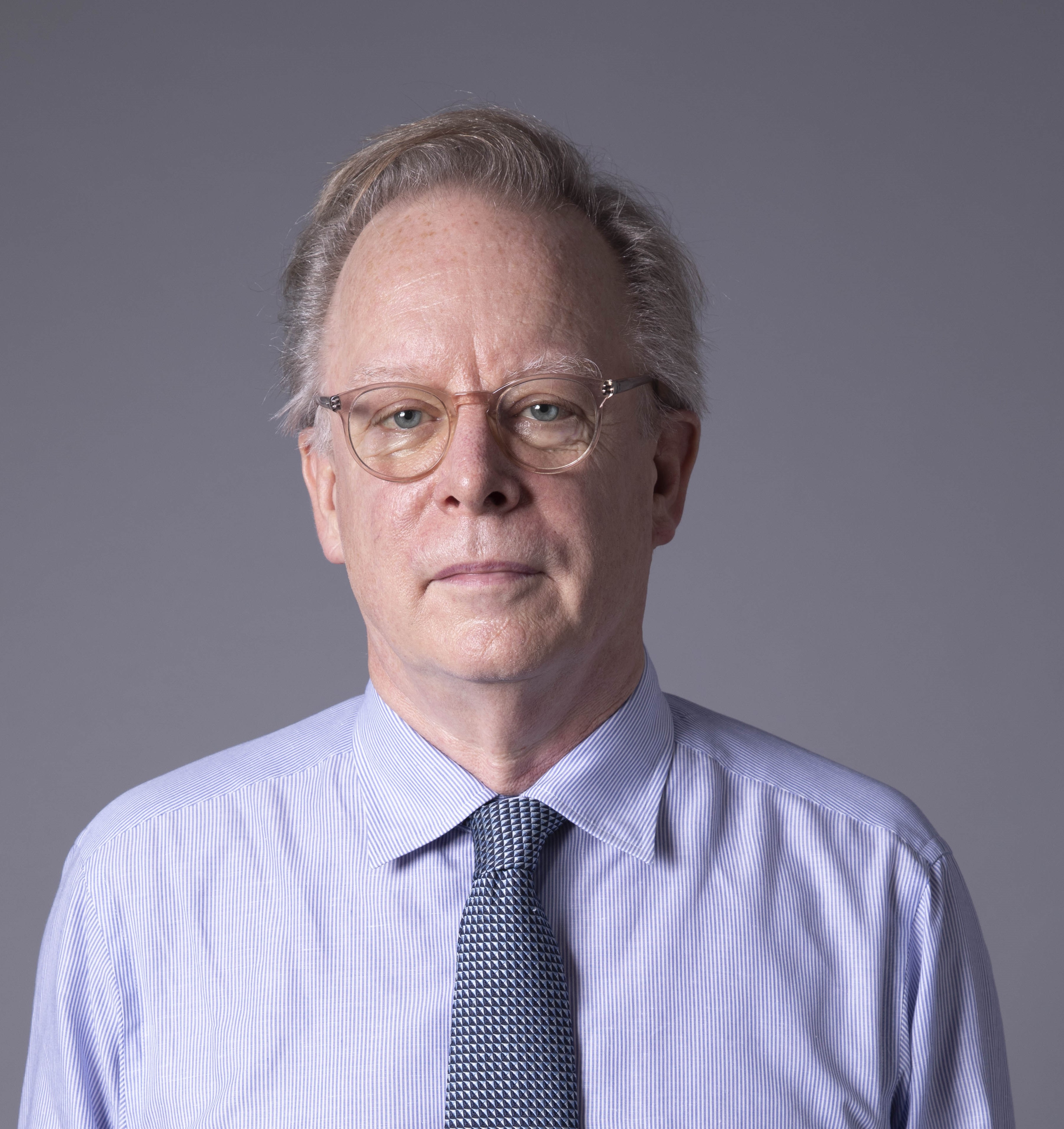
- Born: December 22, 1956 (age 69)
- Occupations: Professor & philanthropist

Peter Baldwin (born December 22, 1956) is a research professor of history at the University of California, Los Angeles, Global Distinguished Professor at New York University, and a philanthropist.

== Early life ==
Baldwin's parents were the medieval historians Jenny Jochens and John W. Baldwin.

== Academic career ==
He was educated at Harvard (MA and PhD, both in History 1980 and 1986), and Yale (BA Philosophy and History, 1978). He has written several books on the comparative history of Europe and America.

Baldwin also serves on the boards of the New York Public Library, the American Council of Learned Societies, the Central European University, and as chair of the board of the Center for Jewish History.

== Philanthropy ==
With his wife Lisbet Rausing, who is an heir of the Tetra Pak fortune, Baldwin co-founded the Arcadia Fund in 2001. The Fund has given away over $1 billion to charities and scholarly institutions globally that preserve cultural heritage and the environment and promote open access.

Arcadia-funded projects include the Endangered Languages Documentation Programme at the Berlin-Brandenburg Academy of Sciences and Humanities, The Endangered Archives Programme at the British Library and Fauna & Flora International's Halcyon Land and Sea fund.

Baldwin joined the advisory board of the Wikimedia Endowment in 2016. Baldwin and Rausing gave $5 million to the Wikimedia Endowment in 2017 and are listed among the biggest benefactors to the Wikimedia Foundation.

== Publications ==
- The Politics of Social Solidarity: Class Bases of the European Welfare State, 1875-1975 (Cambridge University Press, 1990)
- Reworking the Past: Hitler, the Holocaust and the Historians' Debate, edited with an introduction (Beacon Press, 1990)
- Contagion and the State in Europe, 1830-1930 (Cambridge University Press, 1999)
- Disease and Democracy: The Industrialized World Faces AIDS (University of California Press, Berkeley, and the Milbank Memorial Fund, New York, 2005)
- The Narcissism of Minor Differences: How America and Europe Are Alike (Oxford University Press, 2009)
- The Copyright Wars: Three Centuries of Trans-Atlantic Battle (Princeton University Press, 2014)
- Command and Persuade: Crime, Law, and the State across History (MIT Press 2021)
- Fighting the First Wave: Why the Coronavirus was Tackled so Differently across the Globe (Cambridge University Press, 2021)
- Athena Unbound: Why and How Scholarly Knowledge Should Be Free for All (The MIT Press, 2023)
