= John W. Baldwin =

American historian

John Wesley Baldwin (July 13, 1929 – February 8, 2015) was an American historian. He was Charles Homer Haskins professor of history at the Johns Hopkins University.

== Life and career ==
Born in Chicago, Baldwin received his Johns Hopkins University Ph.D. in 1956 and joined the faculty in 1961. While in France on a Fulbright fellowship, he met his future wife, the Danish medievalist Jenny Jochens, with whom he had four children, Peter Baldwin (who himself became a historian), Ian T. Baldwin (later director of the Max Planck Institute for Chemical Ecology), Christopher Baldwin (an information technology specialist), and Birgit Baldwin (who predeceased her father in 1988 while a comparative literature student at Yale). Baldwin, Jochens, and their family established a number of academic grants in Birgit's memory: the Birgit Baldwin Fellowship in French Medieval History, Birgit Baldwin Fellowship in Scandinavian Studies, and Birgit Baldwin Professorship at Yale University.

Baldwin was elected a fellow of the American Academy of Arts and Sciences in 1992. Author of nine books, he was elected to numerous academies including the American Philosophical Society, the Medieval Academy, the British Academy, the Royal Danish Academy of Sciences and Letters, and the Académie des inscriptions et belles lettres. In 2007, Northwestern University conferred on him the degree of Doctor of Humane Letters. He was decorated by the French government with the Ordre National de la Légion d'Honneur and the Ordre des Arts et des Lettres.

For an autobiographical sketch see "A Medievalist and Francophile Despite Himself", in Why France? American Historians Reflect on an Enduring Fascination, edited by Laura Lee Downs and Stéphane Gerson (Cornell University Press, 2007), French translation in Pourquoi la France? (Seul, 2007).

== Books ==
- Medieval Theories of the Just Price: Romanists, Canonists and Theologians in the Twelfth and Thirteen Centuries (Philadelphia: Transactions of the American Philosophical Society, 1959)
- Masters, Princes, and Merchants: The Social Views of Peter the Chanter & His Circle (Princeton: Princeton Univ. Press, 1970), 2 vol.
- The Scholastic Culture of the Middle Ages, 1000-1300 (Lexington: Heath, 1971)
- Universities in Politics; Case Studies from the Late Middle Ages and Early Modern Period. Edited with Richard A. Goldthwaite (Baltimore: Johns Hopkins, 1972)
- The Government of Philip Augustus: Foundations of French Royal Power in the Middle Ages (Berkeley: University of California, 1986, French translation (Paris, Fayard, 1991).
- Les registres de Philippe Auguste (Paris: Imprimerie nationale, 1992)
- The Language of Sex: Five Voices from Northern France Around 1200 (Chicago: University of Chicago, 1996), French translation (Paris, Fayard, 1997)
- Aristocratic Life in Medieval France: The Romances of Jean Renart and Gerbert de Montreuil, 1190–1230. (Baltimore: Johns Hopkins, 2000)
- Paris, 1200 (Paris: Flammarion, 2006), American edition (Stanford University Press, 2010)
