= Dibenzylideneacetone =

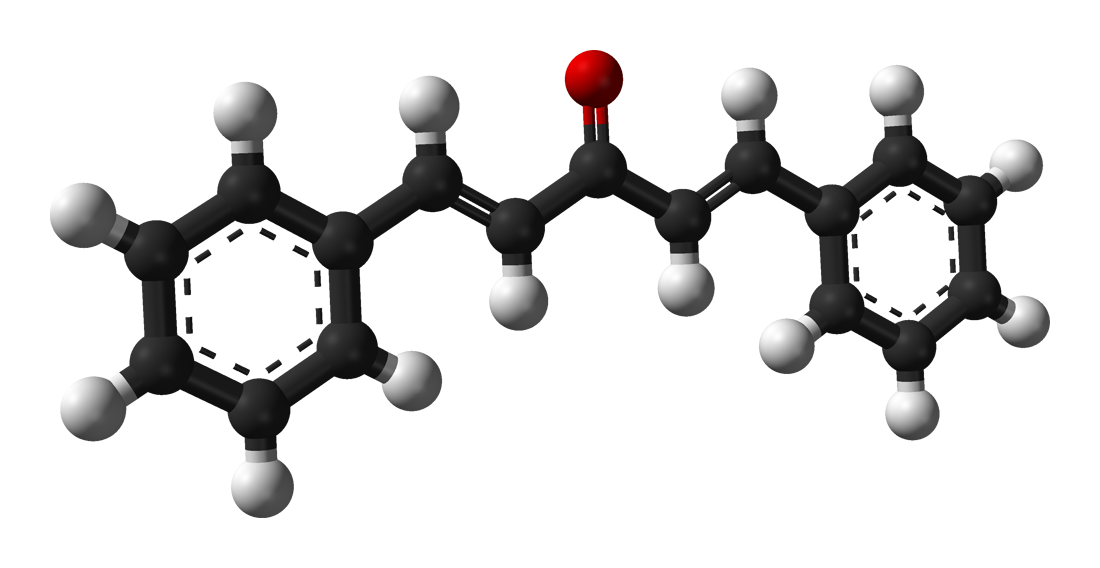

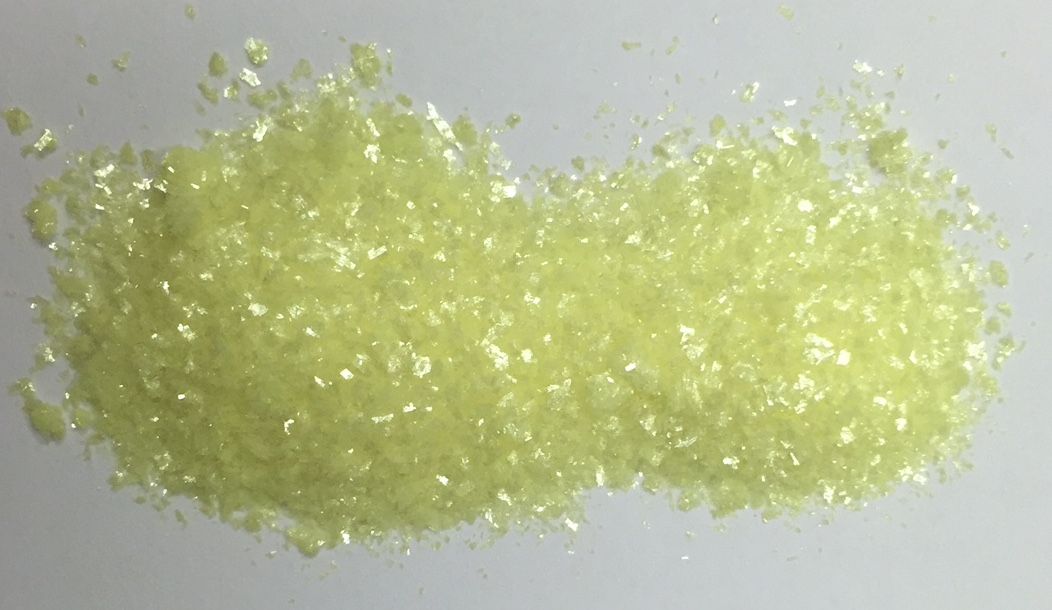

Names
- Preferred IUPAC name (1E,4E)-1,5-Diphenylpenta-1,4-dien-3-one
- Other names Dibenzalacetone

Identifiers
| CAS Number | 538-58-9 non-specific; 35225-79-7 (E,E); 115587-57-0 (E,Z); 58321-78-1 (Z,Z) |
| 3D model (JSmol) | undefined: Interactive image; (E,E): Interactive image; (E,Z): Interactive image; (Z,Z): Interactive image |
| ChEMBL | ChEMBL17201 (E,E) |
| ChemSpider | 86113 undefined; 555548 (E,E); 1266463 (E,Z); 1266462 (Z,Z) |
| ECHA InfoCard | 100.126.050 |
| PubChem CID | 95417 undefined; 640180 (E,E); 1549622 (E,Z); 1549621 (Z,Z) |
| UNII | 9QXO7BCY9L (E,E); N4SH2VDI6Y (E,Z); 5L4OCE3E5U (Z,Z) |
| CompTox Dashboard (EPA) | DTXSID401274418 |
- InChI: undefined: InChI=1S/C17H14O/c18-17(13-11-15-7-3-1-4-8-15)14-12-16-9-5-2-6-10-16/h1-14H Key: WMKGGPCROCCUDY-UHFFFAOYSA-N; (E,E): InChI=1S/C17H14O/c18-17(13-11-15-7-3-1-4-8-15)14-12-16-9-5-2-6-10-16/h1-14H/b13-11+,14-12+ Key: WMKGGPCROCCUDY-PHEQNACWSA-N; (E,Z): InChI=1S/C17H14O/c18-17(13-11-15-7-3-1-4-8-15)14-12-16-9-5-2-6-10-16/h1-14H/b13-11-,14-12+ Key: WMKGGPCROCCUDY-HEEUSZRZSA-N; (Z,Z): InChI=1S/C17H14O/c18-17(13-11-15-7-3-1-4-8-15)14-12-16-9-5-2-6-10-16/h1-14H/b13-11-,14-12- Key: WMKGGPCROCCUDY-XSYHWHKQSA-N
- SMILES: undefined: O=C(C=Cc1ccccc1)C=Cc2ccccc2; (E,E): O=C(/C=C/c1ccccc1)/C=C/c2ccccc2; (E,Z): O=C(\C=C\c1ccccc1)/C=C\c2ccccc2; (Z,Z): O=C(/C=C\c1ccccc1)/C=C\c2ccccc2

Properties
| Chemical formula | C_{17}H_{14}O |
| Molar mass | 234.29 g/mol |
| Appearance | Yellow solid |
| Melting point | 111 °C (232 °F; 384 K) (trans, trans isomer); 60 °C (140 °F; 333 K) (cis, trans isomer) |
| Boiling point | 130 °C (266 °F; 403 K) (cis, cis isomer) |
| Solubility in water | Insoluble |
| Solubility in other solvents | Soluble in acetone and chloroform, slightly soluble in ethanol. |

Hazards
- Occupational safety and health (OHS/OSH)
| Main hazards | Irritant |
- Except where otherwise noted, data are given for materials in their standard state (at 25 °C [77 °F], 100 kPa). verify (what is ?) Infobox references

Dibenzylideneacetone or dibenzalacetone, often abbreviated dba, is an organic compound with the formula C_{17}H_{14}O. It is a pale-yellow solid insoluble in water, but soluble in ethanol.

It was first prepared in 1881 by the German chemist Rainer Ludwig Claisen (1851–1930) and the Swiss chemist Charles-Claude-Alexandre Claparède (14 April 1858 – 1 November 1913).

== Preparation ==
The trans,trans isomer can be prepared in high yield and purity by condensation of benzaldehyde and acetone with sodium hydroxide in a water/ethanol medium followed by recrystallization.

This reaction, which proceeds via the intermediacy of benzylideneacetone, is often performed in organic chemistry classes, and is called Claisen-Schmidt condensation.

== Reactions and derivatives ==
Prolonged exposure to sunlight initiates [2+2] cycloadditions, converting it to a mixture of dimeric and trimeric cyclobutane cycloadducts.

== Uses ==
Dibenzylideneacetone is used as a component in sunscreens and as a ligand in organometallic chemistry.

For example, it is a component of the catalyst tris(dibenzylideneacetone)dipalladium(0). It is a labile ligand that is easily displaced by triphenylphosphine, hence it serves a useful entry point into palladium(0) chemistry.
