= Rainer Ludwig Claisen =

German chemist (1851–1930)

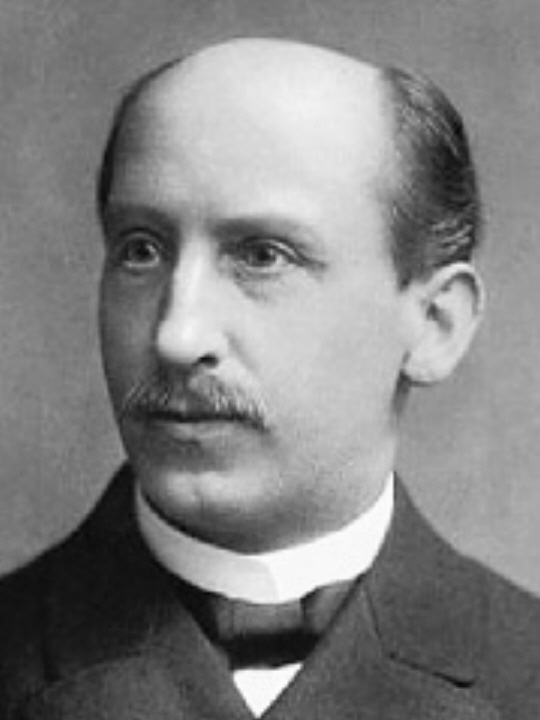
- Rainer Ludwig Claisen in 1897
- Born: 14 January 1851; Cologne
- Died: 5 January 1930 (aged 78); Godesberg am Rhein
- Known for: work with condensations of carbonyls and sigmatropic rearrangements
- Scientific career
- Fields: chemistry

Rainer Ludwig Claisen (German pronunciation: [ˈʁaɪnɐ ˈklaɪzn̩]; 14 January 1851 – 5 January 1930) was a German chemist best known for his work with condensations of carbonyls and sigmatropic rearrangements. He was born in Cologne as the son of a jurist and studied chemistry at the University of Bonn in 1869, where he became a member of K.St.V. Arminia. He served in the army as a nurse from 1870 to 1871 and continued his studies at the University of Göttingen. He returned to the University of Bonn in 1872 and started his academic career at the same university in 1874. He died in 1930 in Godesberg am Rhein (near Bonn).

== Career ==
| 1874 | Promotion at the University of Bonn; position at Kekulé's laboratory |
| 1878 | Habilitation as Privatdozent at the University of Bonn |
| 1882 | Worked with Henry Roscoe and Carl Schorlemmer at Owens College, Manchester (until 1885) |
| 1886 | Worked at the laboratory of von Baeyer (Ludwig-Maximilians-Universität München) |
| 1887 | Habilitation as Privatdozent at the Ludwig-Maximilians-Universität München |
| 1890 | Position as Professor ordinarius of organic chemistry at Technische Hochschule Aachen |
| 1897 | Position as Professor ordinarius of chemistry at Kiel University |
| 1904 | Honorarprofessor at the Friedrich Wilhelm University of Berlin, collaboration with Emil Fischer |
| 1907 | Emeritus; starts his own private laboratory in Godesberg am Rhein |

== Scientific contributions ==
- Described the condensation of aromatic aldehydes with aliphatic aldehydes or ketones in 1881. This variation of the now well-known aldol condensation reaction is called the Claisen–Schmidt condensation.
- Discovered (1887) the condensation reaction of an ester with an activated methylene group, now known as the Claisen condensation.
- Synthesis of cinnamates by reacting aromatic aldehydes with esters. The reaction is known as the Claisen reaction and was described by Claisen for the first time in 1890.
- Discovered the thermally induced rearrangement of allyl phenyl ether in 1912. He details its reaction mechanism in his last scientific publication (1925). In his honor, the reaction has been named the Claisen rearrangement.
- Synthesis of isatin via a process known as the Claisen isatin synthesis, described for the first time in 1879.
- Designer of a special distillation flask called the Claisen flask. (Note: A description and depiction of Claisen's flask appeared in: Claisen, L. (1893). "Beiträge zur Kenntniss der 1,3-Diketone" [Contributions to [our] knowledge of 1,3-diketones]. Annalen der Chemie (in German). 277 (1–2): 162–206. doi:10.1002/jlac.18932770108. Translation of footnote (31) on pages 177–178, which describes and depicts Claisen's flask: 31) During vacuum distillations that were often performed during this and other work, I used advantageously fractionation flasks of a form like those seen in the figures below. The neck of the flask is, as in the case of the distillation apparatus that was devised by Kahlbaum, in two parts; one piece serves for the installation of the capillary tube, [and] the attachment on the side, for the insertion of the thermometer; the upper openings are of such width that a piece of rubber tubing can conveniently be put on [them], and on the other side, the capillary tube and the thermometer can still be easily inserted. One thus avoided the troubles that the use of two-holed rubber stoppers bring with them — the frequent breaking off of the capillary threads and the crushing of the thermometer. Furthermore, these fractionation flasks have still other advantages, which caused me to prefer them to the apparatus by which Anschütz avoided, in a clever way, the two-hole stopper. A surge of the liquid up into the condenser during fitful boiling is less possible here than in the case of a simple one-necked flask; it can be completely avoided if one pours into the (in this case not constricted) side tube (Figure II) a few coarse pieces of glass, which break the thrust of the upwards rushing liquid. One can fill — completely or partially — the space above the glass pieces with glass beads (naturally only in the case of liquids of not too high boiling point), and thus combine the advantages of Hempel's column with vacuum distillation. In the latter way, I have been able to achieve many faster separations and many sharper boiling points than by the usual procedure. However, even without the glass pieces and beads, the differences, highlighted by Anschütz, of heating over an open flame and of distillation using an oil bath don't assert themselves, in large measure, as [they do] in the case of the simple one-necked flask. Flasks of the type mentioned are custom made by the glass blowing firm of C. Heinz & Co. in Aachen. (For literature on this subject, see: Kahlbaum, Boiling Temperature and Pressure, Leipzig, 1885; Anschütz, Distillation Under Reduced Pressure, Bonn 1887; Hantzsch, these Annals 249: 57.) The use of a short Hempel's column during vacuum distillation has also been recommended by Michael (Journal für praktische Chemie, 47: 197).) With the increased modularity of modern glassware this functionality is often achieved with a Claisen adapter, of which there are many types, attached to a normal flask.

== See also ==
- Cinnamic acid
- Dibenzylideneacetone
- Tetrahedral carbonyl addition compound
