= List of annual meetings of the Society for the Advancement of Scandinavian Study =

This is a list of the annual meetings of the Society for the Advancement of Scandinavian Study:

- 114th Annual Meeting (2024): Seattle, WA, hosted by the University of Washington
- 113th Annual Meeting (2023): Austin, TX, hosted by the University of Texas at Austin
- 112th Annual Meeting (2022): Rio Mar, Puerto Rico, hosted by the SASS Executive Committee
- 111th Annual Meeting (2021): Virtual
- 110th Annual Meeting (2020): Postponed
- 109th Annual Meeting (2019): Madison, WI, hosted by the University of Wisconsin–Madison
- 108th Annual Meeting (2018): Los Angeles, CA, hosted by the University of California, Los Angeles
- 107th Annual Meeting (2017): Minneapolis, MN, hosted by St. Olaf College and the University of Minnesota
- 106th Annual Meeting (2016): New Orleans, LA, hosted by the University of Wisconsin–Madison
- 105th Annual Meeting (2015): Columbus, OH, hosted by Ohio State University
- 104th Annual Meeting (2014): New Haven, CT, hosted by Yale University. Held in collaboration with the 24th biennial meeting of the Association for the Advancement of Baltic Studies.(Conference website)
- 103rd Annual Meeting (2013): San Francisco, CA, hosted by the University of California, Berkeley. (Conference website)
- 102nd Annual Meeting (2012): Salt Lake City, UT, hosted by Brigham Young University. (Conference website)
- 101st Annual Meeting (2011): Chicago, IL, hosted by North Park University. (Conference website)
- 100th Annual Meeting (2010): Seattle, WA, hosted by the University of Washington. Held in collaboration with the 22nd biennial meeting of the Association for the Advancement of Baltic Studies. (Conference website)
- 99th Annual Meeting (2009): Madison, WI hosted by the University of Wisconsin–Madison. (Conference website)
- 98th Annual Meeting (2008): Fairbanks, AK hosted by the University of Alaska, Fairbanks.
- 97th Annual Meeting (2007): Quad Cities, IA-IL hosted by Augustana College.
- 96th Annual Meeting (2006): Oxford, MS hosted by the University of Mississippi.
- 95th Annual Meeting (2005): Portland, OR hosted by the Portland State University.
- 94th Annual Meeting (2004): Redondo Beach hosted by the University of California, Los Angeles and University of California, Berkeley.
- 93rd Annual Meeting (2003): Minneapolis/St. Paul, MN hosted by the University of Minnesota.
- 92nd Annual Meeting (2002): Salt Lake City, UT hosted by Brigham Young University.
- 91st Annual Meeting (2001): Chicago, IL hosted by North Park University.
- 90th Annual Meeting (2000): Madison, WI hosted by the University of Wisconsin–Madison.
- 89th Annual Meeting (1999): Seattle, WA hosted by the University of Washington.
- 88th Annual Meeting (1998): Tempe, AZ hosted by the Arizona State University.
- 87th Annual Meeting (1997): Urbana–Champaign, IL hosted by the University of Illinois at Urbana–Champaign.
- 86th Annual Meeting (1996): Williamsburg, VA hosted by the College of William and Mary.
- 85th Annual Meeting (1995): Pullman, WA hosted by Washington State University.
- 84th Annual Meeting (1994): Quad Cities, IA–IL hosted by Augustana College.
- 83rd Annual Meeting (1993): Austin, TX hosted by the University of Texas, Austin.
- 82nd Annual Meeting (1992): Minneapolis/St. Paul, MN hosted by the University of Minnesota.
- 81st Annual Meeting (1991): Amherst, MA hosted by the University of Massachusetts.
- 80th Annual Meeting (1990): Madison, WI hosted by the University of Wisconsin-Madison.
- 79th Annual Meeting (1989): Salt Lake City, UT hosted by Brigham Young University.
- 78th Annual Meeting (1988): Eugene, OR hosted by the University of Oregon.
- 77th Annual Meeting (1987): Columbus, OH hosted by the Ohio State University.
- 76th Annual Meeting (1986): Decorah, IA hosted by Luther College.
- 75th Annual Meeting (1985): Urbana-Champaign, IL hosted by the University of Illinois.
- 74th Annual Meeting (1984): Seattle, WA hosted by the University of Washington.
- 73rd Annual Meeting (1983): Minneapolis/St. Paul, MN hosted by the University of Minnesota.
- 72nd Annual Meeting (1982): Nashville, TN hosted by Vanderbilt University.
- 71st Annual Meeting (1981): Albuquerque, NM hosted by the University of New Mexico.
- 70th Annual Meeting (1980): Ann Arbor, MI hosted by the University of Michigan.
- 69th Annual Meeting (1979): Lawrence, KS hosted by the University of Kansas.
- 68th Annual Meeting (1978): Amherst, MA hosted by the University of Massachusetts.
- 67th Annual Meeting (1977): Seattle, WA hosted by the University of Washington.
- 66th Annual Meeting (1976): Austin, TX hosted by the University of Texas, Austin.
- 65th Annual Meeting (1975): Madison, WI hosted by the University of Wisconsin–Madison.
- 64th Annual Meeting (1974): Washington, DC hosted by George Washington University.
- 63rd Annual Meeting (1973): Minneapolis/St. Paul, MN hosted by the University of Minnesota.
- 62nd Annual Meeting (1972): New York, NY hosted by Columbia University.
- 61st Annual Meeting (1971): Lexington, KY hosted by the University of Kentucky.
- 60th Annual Meeting (1970): Chicago, IL hosted by the University of Chicago.
- 59th Annual Meeting (1969): Minneapolis, MN hosted by Augsburg College.
- 58th Annual Meeting (1968): Berkeley, CA hosted by the University of California, Berkeley.
- 57th Annual Meeting (1967): Bloomington, IN hosted by Indiana University.
- 56th Annual Meeting (1966): Madison, WI hosted by the University of Wisconsin–Madison.
- 55th Annual Meeting (1965): New York, NY hosted by Columbia University.
- 54th Annual Meeting (1964): Los Angeles, CA hosted by the University of California, Los Angeles.
- 53rd Annual Meeting (1963): Minneapolis, MN hosted by Augsburg College.
- 52nd Annual Meeting (1962): Seattle, WA hosted by the University of Washington.
- 51st Annual Meeting (1961): Lincoln, NE hosted by the University of Nebraska.
- 50th Annual Meeting (1960): Chicago, IL hosted by the University of Chicago.
- 49th Annual Meeting (1959): Rock Island, IL hosted by Augustana College.
- 48th Annual Meeting (1958): Berkeley, CA hosted by the University of California, Berkeley.
- 47th Annual Meeting (1957): Chicago, IL hosted by North Park University.
- 46th Annual Meeting (1956): Lawrence, KS hosted by the University of Kansas.
- 45th Annual Meeting (1955): Williamsburg, VA hosted by the College of William and Mary.
- 44th Annual Meeting (1954): Rock Island, IL hosted by Augustana College.
- 43rd Annual Meeting (1953): Lincoln, NE hosted by the University of Nebraska.
- 42nd Annual Meeting (1952): Decorah, IA hosted by Luther College.
- 41st Annual Meeting (1951): Chicago, IL hosted by North Park University.
- 40th Annual Meeting (1950): Northfield, MN hosted by St. Olaf College.
- 39th Annual Meeting (1949): East Orange, NJ hosted by Upsala College.
- 38th Annual Meeting (1948): Grand Forks, ND hosted by the University of North Dakota.
- 37th Annual Meeting (1947): Chicago, IL hosted by the University of Chicago.
- 36th Annual Meeting (1946): Lindsborg, KS hosted by the Bethany College.
- No annual meetings held between 1943 and 1945
- 32nd Annual Meeting (1942): Blair, NE hosted by Dana College.
- 31st Annual Meeting (1941): Chicago, IL hosted by North Park University.
- 30th Annual Meeting (1940): Northfield, MN hosted by St. Olaf College
- 29th Annual Meeting (1939): Rock Island, IL hosted by Augustana College.
- 28th Annual Meeting (1938): Madison, WI hosted by the University of Wisconsin–Madison.
- 27th Annual Meeting (1937): Lincoln, NE hosted by the University of Nebraska.
- 26th Annual Meeting (1936): Chicago, IL hosted by the University of Chicago.
- 25th Annual Meeting (1935): Decorah, IA hosted by Luther College.
- 24th Annual Meeting (1934): Minneapolis, MN hosted by Augsburg College.
- No annual meeting held in 1933
- 22nd Annual Meeting (1932): Evanston, IL hosted by Northwestern University.
- 21st Annual Meeting (1931): Rock Island, IL hosted by Augustana College.
- 20th Annual Meeting (1930): Ann Arbor, MI hosted by the University of Michigan.
- 19th Annual Meeting (1929): Northfield, MN hosted by St. Olaf College.
- 18th Annual Meeting (1928): Chicago, IL hosted by the University of Chicago
- 17th Annual Meeting (1927): Madison, WI hosted by the University of Wisconsin–Madison.
- 16th Annual Meeting (1926): Minneapolis, MN hosted by the University of Minnesota.
- 15th Annual Meeting (1925): Chicago, IL hosted by the University of Chicago.
- 14th Annual Meeting (1924): Urbana, IL hosted by the University of Illinois.
- 13th Annual Meeting (1923): Iowa City, IA hosted by the University of Iowa.
- 12th Annual Meeting (1922): Chicago, IL hosted by Chicago Svenska Klubben
- 11th Annual Meeting (1921): Northfield, MN hosted by St. Olaf College
- 10th Annual Meeting (1920): St. Peter, MN hosted by Gustavus Adolphus College
- 9th Annual Meeting (1919): Chicago, IL hosted by Chicago Norske Klub
- 8th Annual Meeting (1918): Chicago, IL hosted by University of Chicago
- 7th Annual Meeting (1917): Minneapolis, MN hosted by University of Minnesota
- 6th Annual Meeting (1916): Madison, WI hosted by University of Wisconsin-Madison
- 5th Annual Meeting (1915): Evanston, IL hosted by Northwestern University
- 4th Annual Meeting (1914): Minneapolis, MN hosted by University of Minnesota
- 3rd Annual Meeting (1913): Rock Island, IL hosted by Augustana College
- 2nd Annual Meeting (1912): Evanston, IL hosted by Northwestern University
- 1st Annual Meeting (1911): Chicago, IL hosted by University of Chicago
