= Journal of Finnish Studies =

Journal that publishes scholarly articles about Finland

The Journal of Finnish Studies is a double-blind, peer-reviewed journal that publishes scholarly articles about Finland for an international audience. The journal was established in 1997 at the University of Toronto by Professor Börje Vähämäki. In 2009, the journal moved to Finlandia University, where it was edited by Professor Beth Virtanen until 2011.

For a decade (2011–2021), the Journal of Finnish Studies was edited in the English Department at Sam Houston State University by Professor Helena Halmari. The co-editor of the journal was Professor and Vice Rector Hanna Snellman at the University of Helsinki, the associate editor was Dr. Scott Kaukonen at Sam Houston State University, and the assistant editor was Dr. Hilary-Joy Virtanen at Finlandia University. Dr. Sheila Embleton from York University served as the book-review editor. Volumes 15 through 24 were edited at Sam Houston State University.

Since 2022, the journal has been published by University of Illinois press.

The mission of the Journal of Finnish Studies is to publish scholarly articles about topics related to Finland and the Finnish diaspora for the international, English-speaking audience. Each volume includes two issues, and the journal also publishes guest-edited theme issues from time to time. The journal's editorial board includes prominent academics both in Finland and internationally.

Starting from volume 25, the Journal of Finnish Studies is co-edited by Professors Thomas A. DuBois (University of Wisconsin) and Hilary-Joy Virtanen (Finlandia University).

- LCCN Permalink: https://lccn.loc.gov/98651401
- LC classification: PH300.J68
- ISSN 1206-6516 (each issue has a separate ISBN)
