= Claisen–Schmidt condensation =

Named reaction in organic chemistry

In organic chemistry, the Claisen–Schmidt condensation is the reaction between an aldehyde or ketone having an α-hydrogen with an aromatic carbonyl compound lacking an α-hydrogen. It can be considered as a specific variation of the aldol condensation. This reaction is named after two of its pioneering investigators Rainer Ludwig Claisen and J. Gustav Schmidt, who independently published on this topic in 1880 and 1881. An example is the synthesis of dibenzylideneacetone ((1E, 4E)-1,5-diphenylpenta-1,4-dien-3-one).

Quantitative yields in Claisen–Schmidt reactions have been reported in the absence of solvent using sodium hydroxide as the base and plus benzaldehydes. Because the enolizable nucleophilic carbonyl compound and the electrophilic carbonyl compound are two different chemicals, the Claisen–Schmidt reaction is an example of a crossed aldol process.
