= Benzylacetone =

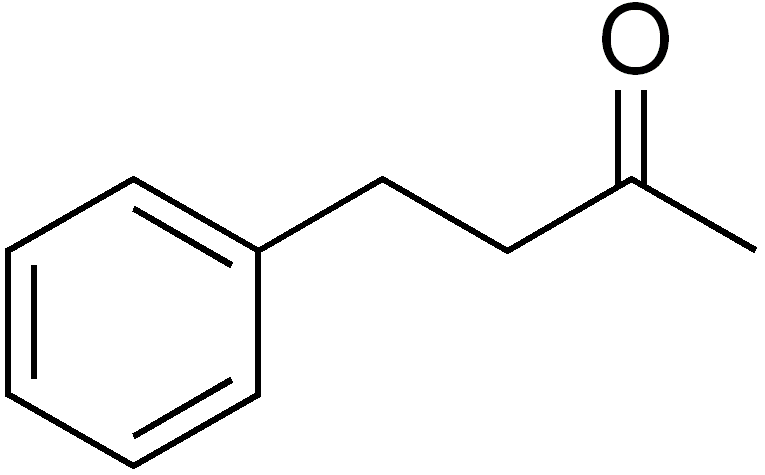

Names
- Preferred IUPAC name 4-Phenylbutan-2-one
- Other names 4-Phenyl-2-butanone; Methyl 2-phenylethyl ketone

Identifiers
CAS Number	2550-26-7
3D model (JSmol)	Interactive image
ChemSpider	16422
ECHA InfoCard	100.018.044
PubChem CID	17355
UNII	UZM5QH16YW
CompTox Dashboard (EPA)	DTXSID6033241
- InChI: InChI=1S/C10H12O/c1-9(11)7-8-10-5-3-2-4-6-10/h2-6H,7-8H2,1H3 Key: AKGGYBADQZYZPD-UHFFFAOYSA-N; InChI=1/C10H12O/c1-9(11)7-8-10-5-3-2-4-6-10/h2-6H,7-8H2,1H3 Key: AKGGYBADQZYZPD-UHFFFAOYAH
- SMILES: O=C(CCc1ccccc1)C

Properties
Chemical formula	C_{10}H_{12}O
Molar mass	148.205 g·mol^{−1}
Density	0.989 g/mL
Melting point	−13 °C (9 °F; 260 K)
Boiling point	235 °C (455 °F; 508 K)

Hazards
Flash point	98 °C (208 °F; 371 K)
- Except where otherwise noted, data are given for materials in their standard state (at 25 °C [77 °F], 100 kPa). verify (what is ?) Infobox references

Benzylacetone (IUPAC name: 4-phenylbutan-2-one) is a liquid with a sweet, flowery smell that is considered to be the most abundant attractant compound in flowers (e.g. Coyote Tobacco, Nicotiana attenuata) and one of volatile components of cocoa.

It can be used as an attractant for melon flies (Bactrocera cucurbitae), in perfume for its floral and balsamic aroma, and as an odorant for soap.

It can be prepared by the hydrogenation of benzylideneacetone.

== See also ==
- Odor
- Pheromone
- Fragrances
