= Susan Brantly =

American scholar

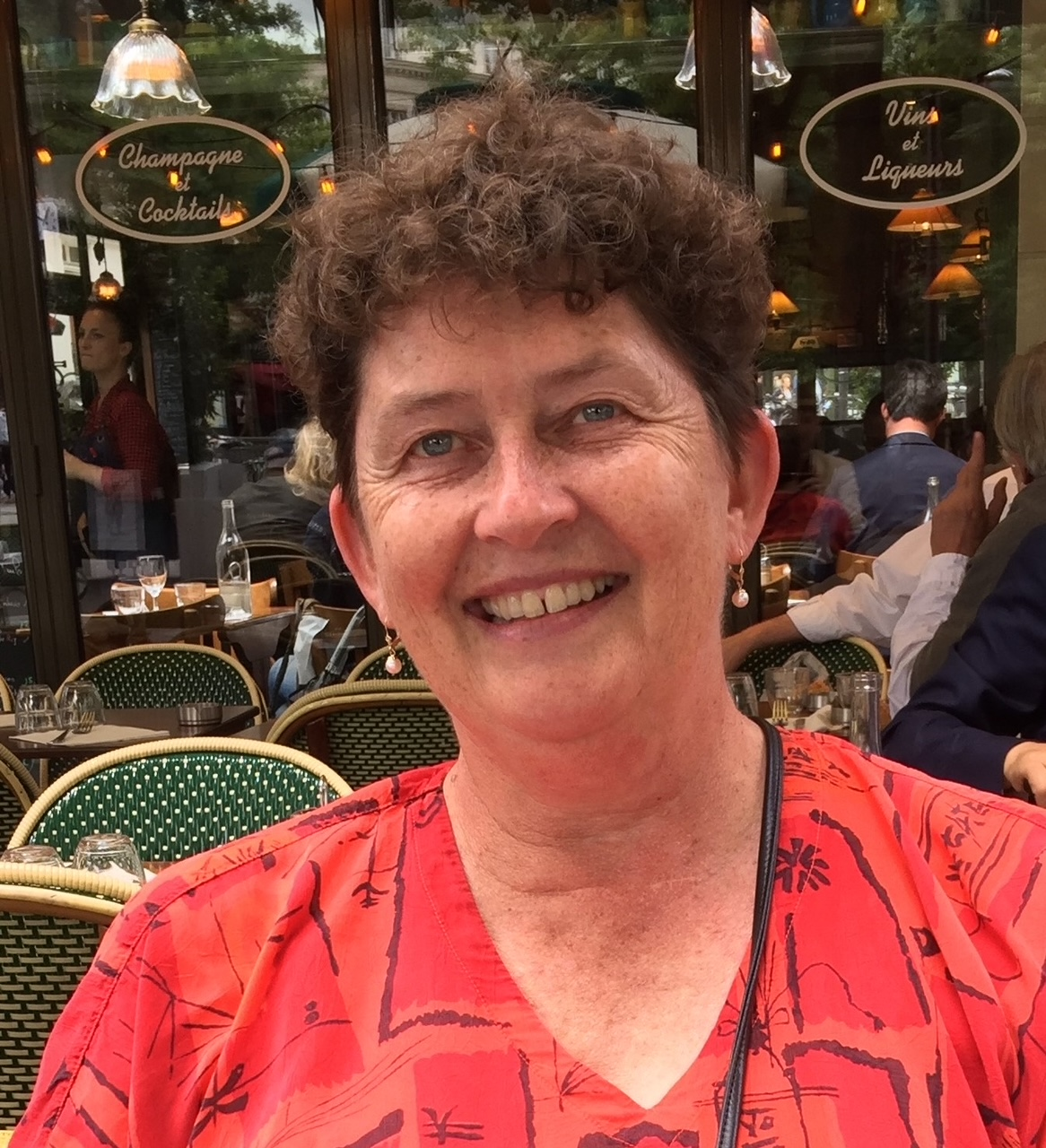
Susan Brantly in Paris

Susan Brantly is an American scholar in Scandinavian literature and a professor emerita at the University of Wisconsin–Madison. She was affiliated with the Department of Scandinavian Studies (now the Department of German, Nordic and Slavic+) at the University of Wisconsin from 1987 to 2025. Brantly is an expert in 19th and 20th century Swedish literature. She has also published extensively on The Modern Breakthrough, Isak Dinesen (Karen Blixen), and Scandinavian historical fiction, among other subjects.

== Early life ==
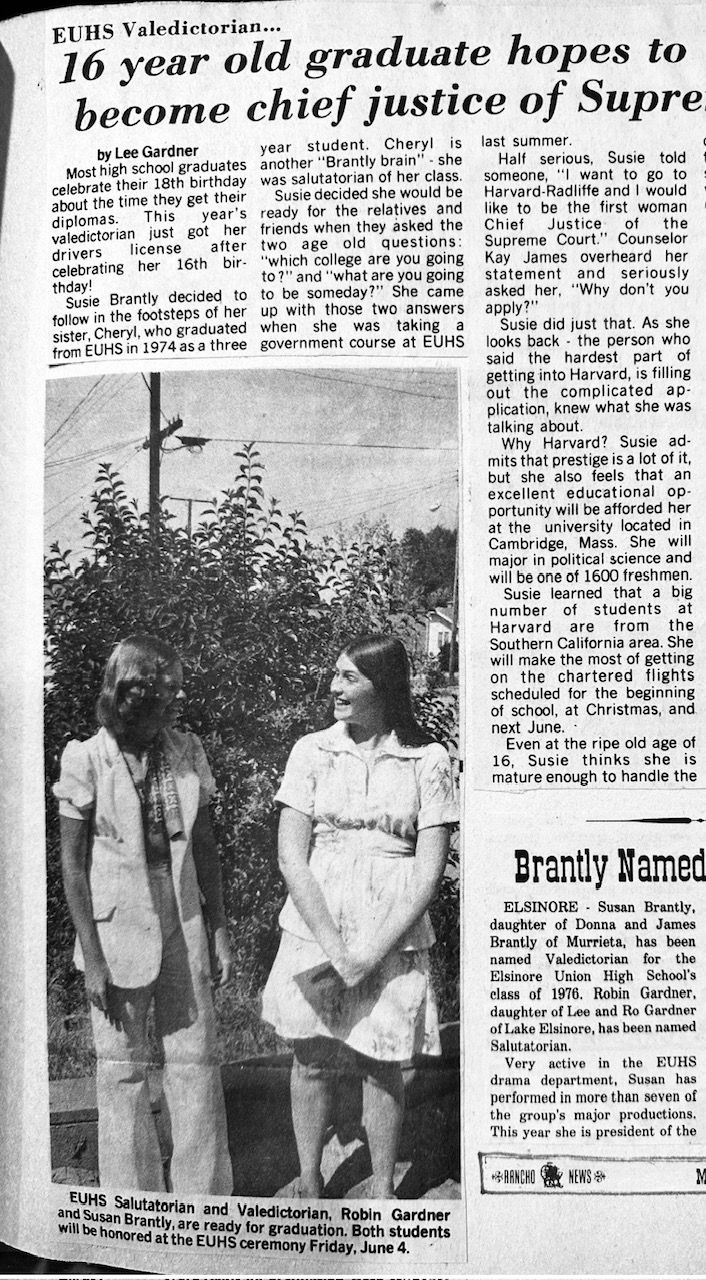
Susan Brantly as Valedictorian of Elsinore Union High School, 1976

Brantly was born in Fallbrook, California, and raised in Murrieta, California, a rural community in Riverside County. Her father, James Brantly, was a Navy Veteran who worked in border patrol and law enforcement. Her mother, Donna Brantly, was an assistant superintendent for the Murrieta Valley Independent School District. In 1976, Brantly graduated valedictorian from Elsinore Union High School at the age of 16. While taking a summer government course at EUHS, Brantly expressed a desire to enroll at Harvard University and become the first female Chief Justice of the Supreme Court. A guidance counselor overheard this conversation and encouraged Brantly to follow through with the application. Brantly was accepted into Harvard University in 1976. During her freshman year, Brantly majored in political science but she later changed her academic focus to German and Scandinavian Studies after enrolling in a course on the “Heroic Tradition in Northern Europe” with film scholar, Carol Clover.

== Career ==
Brantly received her Bachelor of Arts Degree in German and Scandinavian from Harvard University in 1980. She went on to finish her Master of Arts Degree in Scandinavian Literature from the University of Minnesota in 1983, and her Ph.D. in Germanic Languages and Literature from Yale University in 1987. From 1981-1982, she spent a year abroad in Sweden as a Fulbright grantee. At Yale, Brantly wrote her doctoral dissertation on the life and works of Baltic-German literary critic Laura Marholm under the direction of George Schoolfield.

After finishing her Ph.D., Brantly was hired by the Scandinavian Studies Department at the University of Wisconsin, where she worked as a professor for 38 years. She served as chair of the department from 1996 to 1999 and from 2002 to 2005. From 2007 to 2009, she served as president of the Society for the Advancement of Scandinavian Study. She also served as the director of the Bradley Learning Community for eighteen years (2007-2025) and the director of the Center for European Studies at the University of Wisconsin-Madison for three years (2007-2010). From 2016 to 2019, she held the Birgit Baldwin Professorship at UW-Madison. For over 20 years, Brantly was responsible for teaching the course "Masterpieces of Scandinavian Literature: The 20th Century" at the university. In 2018, she published an article about her approach to teaching this introductory course on Nordic Modernism in the journal Humanities. In 2013, Brantly became the editor of Scandinavian Studies, the quarterly journal published by the Society for the Advancement of Scandinavian Study, a position she held until 2023.

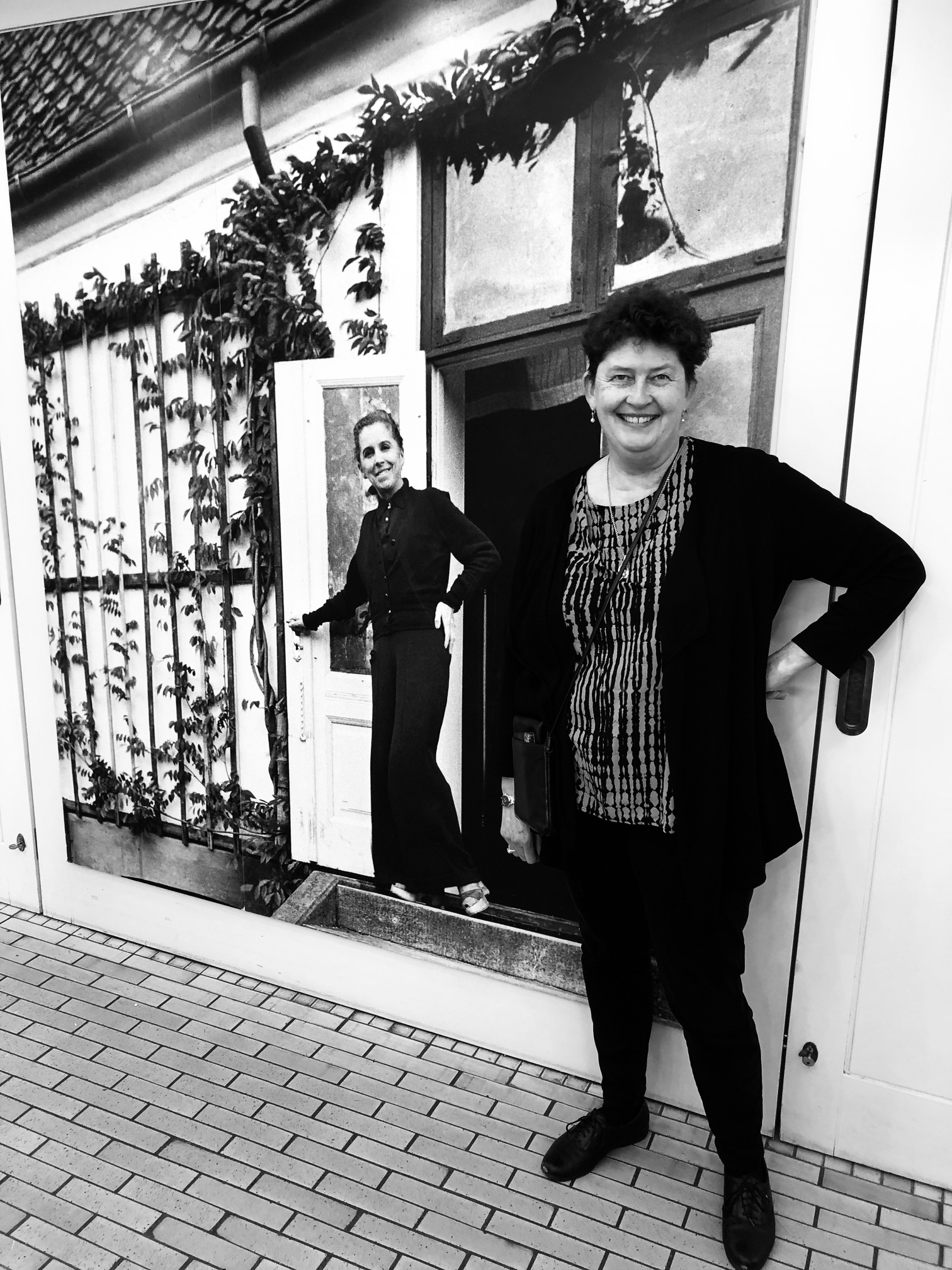
Susan Brantly at the Blixen Museum

Brantly has published articles on writers such as P.C. Jersild, Sven Delblanc, Sara Lidman, Per Anders Fogelström, P.O. Enquist and others in the journals Clio, Scandinavica, Comparative Literature, Scandinavian Studies, and Horizont. In 2002, she published the book Understanding Isak Dinesen, which analyzes the narrative complexities and literary allusions embedded in Karen Blixen’s major works. Contemporary historical fiction remains a central research interest for Brantly. In 2017, she published the book The Historical Novel, Transnationalism and the Postmodern Era: Presenting the Past through Routledge Press. The work explores how historical fiction challenges and deconstructs the idea of nationhood in the postmodern era, paying close attention to works of Swedish historical fiction. Brantly has also published on August Strindberg and other nineteenth-century Nordic writers and maintains a keen interest in modernist studies. Brantly edited the Studies in Nordic Literature and Film series, published by the Welsh Academic Press. Over the years, she has published several articles on the works of Nobel Prize-winning Swedish poet Verner von Heidenstam and his artistic relationship to the aesthetics of the fin de siècle.

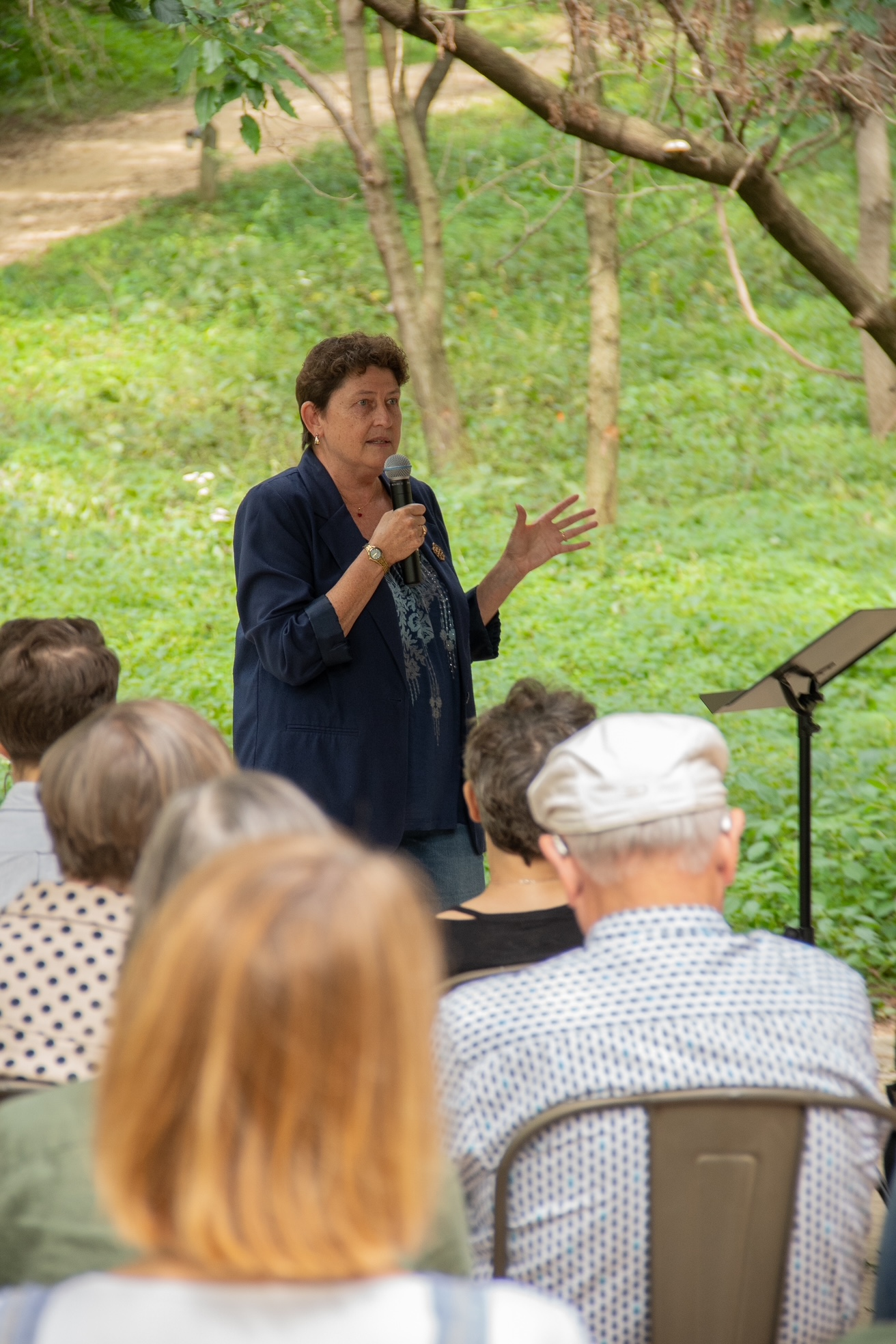
Susan Brantly at American Players Theatre Talk

In 2017, Brantly worked as a consultant for Lucas Hnath’s Tony Award-winning play, A Doll's House, Part 2. The play is a sequel to Henrik Ibsen's 1879 play, A Doll's House. The plot follows the original protagonist, Nora Helmer, as she seeks to finalize her divorce from her husband Torvald, fifteen years after storming out of her home and slamming the door on him and her three children.

In 2024, Brantly and literary translator Kathy Saranpa co-edited and published George Schoolfield’s manuscript, A Literary and Historical Exploration of the Life and Works of Runar Schildt. The book was Schoolfield's final scholarly project and remained unfinished after his death in 2016. Brantly and Saranpa published the work posthumously as a tribute to Schoolfield, who served as their advisor at Yale. It is the first scholarly work about the writings of Fenno-Swedish author Runar Schildt written in English.

In 2025, Wisconsin Public Radio reported that Brantly had collaborated with a team of specialists from the New York-based art research firm LMI Group to investigate the authenticity of an alleged Vincent van Gogh painting titled “Elimar,” which was purchased at a Minnesota garage sale in 2016. According to a report published by the LMI Group, the work may have been created during van Gogh’s stay at a French sanitarium in 1889. Brantly contributed a chapter in the report detailing the literary historical context of the painting, which is believed to depict a character from Hans Christian Andersen's 1848 novel The Two Baronesses. The Van Gogh Museum in Amsterdam has, to date, declined to recognize the painting's authenticity.

== Personal life ==
Brantly is married to fellow Scandinavianist, Scott Mellor.

== Awards ==
- 1981-1982 Fulbright Fellowship to Sweden
- 1985 recipient of the American Scandinavian Foundation’s Thord-Grey Fellowship to Sweden
- 2003 recipient of the Chancellor's Distinguished Teaching Award at University of Wisconsin-Madison
- 2004 recipient of Outstanding Faculty Member by The UW Panhellenic Association
- 2013 recipient of UW System Alliant Energy Underkofler Excellence in Teaching Award
- 2017, Named Distinguished Honorary Member of the National Society of Collegiate Scholars

== Works ==
- Brantly, Susan (1991). The Life and Writings of Laura Marholm. Helbing & Lichtenhahn. ISBN 978-3719011826.
- Brantly, Susan (2002). Understanding Isak Dinesen. University of South Carolina Press. ISBN 978-1570034282.
- Brantly, Susan (2004). Laura Marholm: Ihr Leben und ihre Werke. Müggle-Verlag Rolf F. Lang. ISBN 3-9806805-9-2. OCLC 698945831. (Trans. Albert Burkhardt)
- Brantly, Susan (2004). Sex and The Modern Breakthrough: An Anthology. University of Wisconsin Press. ISBN 978-8123455952.
- Brantly, Susan (2009). The Nordic Storyteller: Essays in Honour of Niels Ingwersen. Cambridge Scholars Publishing. ISBN 978-1443801454. (ed. with Thomas A. DuBois)
- Brantly, Susan (2017). The Historical Novel, Transnationalism, and the Postmodern Era: Presenting the Past. New York: Routledge. ISBN 9781138230255
- Schoolfield, George (2024). A Literary and Historical Exploration of the Life and Works of Runar Schildt. Cambridge Scholars Publishing. ISBN 9781042804757 (eds. Susan Brantly and Kathy Saranpa)
