= Society for the Advancement of Scandinavian Study =

US organization

The Society for the Advancement of Scandinavian Study (SASS) is a scholarly society that aims to advance the study, teaching and research in America of the languages, literature, history, culture and society of the Scandinavian or Nordic countries and to foster closer relationships between people interested in the field of Scandinavian studies.

== History ==
The Society for the Advancement of Scandinavian Study (SASS) was founded in 1911. Julius E. Olson from the University of Wisconsin–Madison served as the first President. In the same year, the first SASS conference was held at the University of Chicago, in Chicago, Illinois. No annual meeting was held in 1933 or between 1943 and 1945. In 2003, the society was admitted as a member of the American Council of Learned Societies.

== Publications ==
The society publishes the quarterly journal Scandinavian Studies (ISSN 0036-5637), which has been published by Brigham Young University, and since 2013 by the University of Illinois Press. Susan Brantly, professor of Scandinavian Literature at the University of Wisconsin–Madison is the current editor. The society also publishes an internal newsletter, SASS News and Notes (ISSN 0891-7477) and arranges an annual conference.

== Current officers ==
- President: Margaret Hayford O'Leary (2015–2017)
- Vice President: Tim Tangherlini (2015–2017)
- SASS Advisory Committee Representative for the language and literature field: Chip Oscarson (2013–2017)
- SASS Advisory Committee Representative for history and the social sciences: Peter Leonard (2013–2017)

== See also ==
- List of annual meetings of the Society for the Advancement of Scandinavian Study
- List of presidents of the Society for the Advancement of Scandinavian Study
