= Sunday Times Rich List 2023 =

List of wealthiest residents of the UK

The Sunday Times Rich List 2023 is the 35th annual survey of the wealthiest people resident in the United Kingdom, published by The Sunday Times online on 19 May 2023 and in print on 21 May 2023.

The list was edited by Robert Watts who succeeded long-term compiler Philip Beresford in 2017. He noted of the 2023 list: "This year's Sunday Times Rich List shows a golden period for the super rich is over. For the first time in 14 years we've seen the number of UK billionaires fall."

The list was widely reported by other media.

== Top 12 fortunes ==
2023		Name	Citizenship	Source of wealth	2022	
Rank	Net worth £ bn	Name	Citizenship	Source of wealth	Rank	Net worth £ bn
01	£35.00 ▲	Gopi Hinduja	United Kingdom	Industry and finance	1	£28.472
02 ▲	£29.688 ▲	Sir Jim Ratcliffe	United Kingdom	Industry (Ineos)	12	£6.075
03 ▲	£28.625 ▲	Sir Len Blavatnik	United States & United Kingdom	Investment, music and media	4	£20.00
04 ▼	£24.399 ▲	David and Simon Reuben and family	United Kingdom	Property and Internet	3	£22.265
05 ▼	£23.00	Sir James Dyson and family	United Kingdom	Industry (Dyson)	2	£23.00
06 ▼	£16.00 ▼	Lakshmi Mittal and family	India	Steel	5	£17.00
07 ▲	£14.50 ▲	Guy, George, Alannah and Galen Weston and family	Canada & United Kingdom	Retailing	8	£13.50
08 ▲	£13.122 ▲	Charlene de Carvalho-Heineken and Michel de Carvalho	Netherlands	Inheritance, banking, brewing (Heineken)	9	£11.421
09	£12.00	Kirsten Rausing and Jörn Rausing	Sweden	Inheritance and investment (Tetra Pak)	8	£12.00
10 ▲	£11.50 ▲	Michael Platt	United Kingdom	Hedge fund (BlueCrest Capital Management)	11	£10.00
11 ▲	£9.878 ▲	Hugh Grosvenor, 7th Duke of Westminster and Grosvenor family	United Kingdom	Inheritance and property	13	£9.726
12 ▲	£9.348 ▼	Märit Rausing, Lisbet Rausing, Sigrid Rausing and Hans Kristian Rausing	Sweden	Inheritance and investment (Tetra Pak)	15	£9.49

== See also ==
- Forbes list of billionaires
