= Birgit Rausing =

Swedish art historian and philanthropist (born 1924)

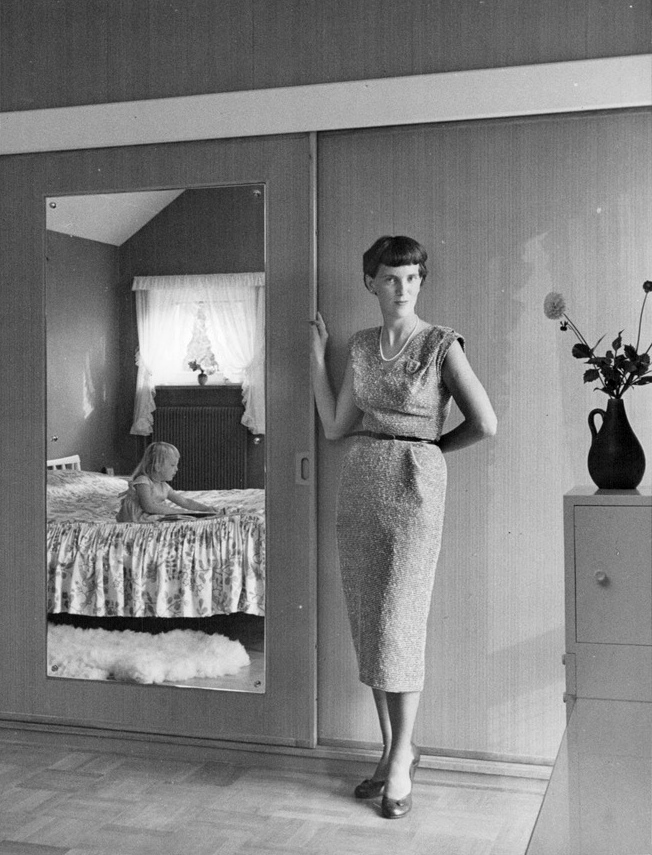
- Born: Birgit Mayne; 26 October 1924 (age 101)
- Citizenship: Sweden
- Spouse: Gad Rausing (died 2000)
- Children: Kirsten, Finn and Jörn

Birgit Rausing (born 26 October 1924) is a Swedish art historian, philanthropist, a former billionaire heiress and the widow of Gad Rausing (1922–2000).

== Biography ==
She is the daughter of Swedish landscape painter Henry Mayne (1891–1975). In 1944 her father-in-law Ruben Rausing (1895–1983) founded Tetra Pak, which revolutionized the packaging of liquids such as juices and milk. The company was inherited by his sons Gad and Hans. In 1996, Gad bought his brother's half of the company. When Gad died in 2000, his wife Birgit and their three children inherited packaging giant Tetra Laval.

Birgit Rausing and her family had an estimated net worth of US$13.0 billion in 2010. She is the third wealthiest person in Sweden, according to Forbes magazine.

== Gad and Birgit Rausing Library ==
The Lahore University of Management Sciences (LUMS) library has been renamed as Gad & Birgit Rausing Library to acknowledge the donation provided by the Rausing family to construct the library building. Dennis Jönsson, CEO Tetra Pak inaugurated the Library in March 2011.

== See also ==
- List of billionaires
- Rausing family

== Bibliography ==
- Min far Henry Mayne. (My father Henry Mayne); 2008; ISBN 9789173311335
