= Sunday Times Rich List 2015 =

Annually published UK list

The Sunday Times Rich List 2015 is the 27th annual survey of the wealthiest people resident in the United Kingdom, published by The Sunday Times on 26 April 2015.

The Guardian reported that the collective wealth of Britain’s 1,000 richest people had more than doubled in the last 10 years with a combined fortune of just over £547bn and a fortune of £100m was now required to qualify for the list.

This year's list marked the first year Queen Elizabeth II was not among the list's top 300 most wealthy since the list began in 1989. In the Sunday Times Rich List 1989, the Queen had been ranked number one in the United Kingdom, with a net worth of £5.2 billion, which included state assets that were not hers personally, (approximately £16.3 billion in today's value).

== Top 15 fortunes ==
2015		Name	Citizenship	Source of wealth	2014	
Rank	Net worth £ bn	Name	Citizenship	Source of wealth	Rank	Net worth £ bn
1 ▲	£13.18 ▲	Leonard Blavatnik	United States	Industry	4	£11.00
2 ▼	£13.00 ▲	Sri and Gopi Hinduja	India	Industry and finance	1	£11.90
3 ▲	£11.00 ▲	Galen Weston and George G. Weston and family	Canada	Retailing	11	£7.30
4 ▼	£9.80 ▼	Alisher Usmanov	Russia	Mining and investment	2	£10.65
5 ▲	£9.70 ▲	David and Simon Reuben	United Kingdom	Property and internet	7	£9.00
6 ▼	£9.45 ▼	Ernesto and Kirsty Bertarelli	Switzerland & United Kingdom	Pharmaceuticals	5	£9.75
7 ▼	£9.20 ▼	Lakshmi Mittal and family	India	Steel	3	£10.25
8	£8.70 ▼	Kirsten Rausing and Jörn Rausing	Sweden	Inheritance and investment (Tetra Pak)	8	£8.80
9 ▲	£8.56 ▲	The Duke of Westminster	United Kingdom	Property	10	£8.50
10 ▼	£7.29 ▼	Roman Abramovich	Russia	Oil and industry	9	£8.52
11 ▼	£7.24 ▼	John Fredriksen and family	Cyprus	Shipping and oil services	6	£9.25
12	£7.15 ▲	Charlene de Carvalho-Heineken and Michel de Carvalho	Netherlands	Inheritance, banking, brewing (Heineken)	12	£6.36
13 ▲	£6.50 ▲	Sir David Barclay and Sir Frederick Barclay	United Kingdom	Property, media, retailing	16	£6.00
14 ▲	£6.40 ▲	Hans Rausing and family	Sweden	Packaging (Tetra Pak)	17	£5.90
15 ▼	£5.94 ▼	Mohamed Bin Issa Al Jaber and family	Saudi Arabia	Property, hotels (MBI Group)	13	£6.16

== See also ==
- Forbes list of billionaires
