= Sunday Times Rich List 2014 =

Annually published UK list

The Sunday Times Rich List 2014 was the 26th annual survey of the wealthiest people resident in the United Kingdom, published by The Sunday Times on 18 May 2014.

The Guardian reported that "the combined fortune of Britain's richest 1,000 people has hit a new high of £519bn – equivalent to a third of the nation's economic output, and double the figure of five years ago."

== Top 12 fortunes ==
2014		Name	Citizenship	Source of wealth	2013	
Rank	Net worth £ bn	Name	Citizenship	Source of wealth	Rank	Net worth £ bn
1 ▲	£11.90 ▲	Sri and Gopi Hinduja	United Kingdom	Industry and finance	3	£10.60
2 ▼	£10.65 ▼	Alisher Usmanov	Russia	Mining and investment	1	£13.30
3 ▲	£10.25 ▲	Lakshmi Mittal and family	India	Steel	4	£10.00
4 ▼	£10.00 ▼	Leonard Blavatnik	United States	Industry	2	£11.00
5 ▲	£9.75 ▲	Ernesto and Kirsty Bertarelli	Switzerland & United Kingdom	Pharmaceuticals	9	£7.40
6	£9.25	John Fredriksen and family	Cyprus	Shipping and oil services	6	£8.80
7	£9.00 ▲	David and Simon Reuben	United Kingdom	Property and internet	7	£8.28
8 ▲	£8.80 ▲	Kirsten Rausing and Jörn Rausing	Sweden	Inheritance and investment (Tetra Pak)	12	£5.11
9 ▼	£8.52 ▼	Roman Abramovich	Russia	Oil and industry	5	£9.30
10 ▼	£8.50 ▲	The Duke of Westminster	United Kingdom	Property	8	£7.80
11	£7.30 ▲	Galen Weston and George G. Weston and family	Canada	Retailing	11	£6.65
12 ▼	£6.37 ▼	Charlene de Carvalho-Heineken and Michel Carvalho	Netherlands	Inheritance, banking, brewing (Heineken)	10	£7.00

== See also ==
- Forbes list of billionaires
