= Rausing family =

Swedish family of Tetra Pak founder

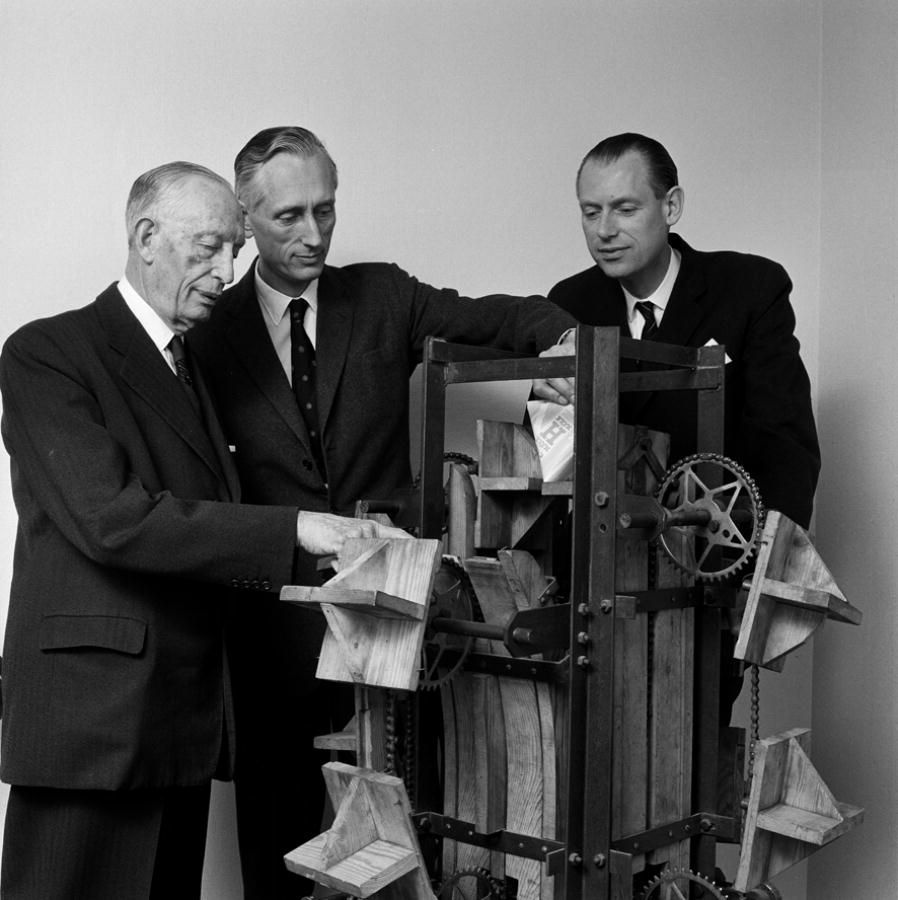
- Ruben, Gad, and Hans with the first Tetra Pak filling machine
- Current region: Sweden; United Kingdom
- Origin: Raus, Helsingborg
- Founder: Ruben Rausing

The Rausing family are a wealthy Swedish family, best known for the Tetra Pak founder Ruben Rausing. Several members of the family now live in the United Kingdom.

== History ==
The son of the small business owners August Andersson and Mathilda Fredrika Svensson, Ruben Andersson (later Rausing), was born in 1895 in Raus, Helsingborg. Ruben studied at the Stockholm School of Economics and Business Administration and at Columbia University in the United States, from which he received the degree of Master of Science in 1920. Back in Sweden later that same year, he became a director of Esselte.

In 1921 he changed his surname to Rausing. In 1929, he became a partner in a packaging company, Åkerlund & Rausing. In 1933, he bought out the other partners' shares. In the early 1940s, he had the idea of manufacturing packaging for liquid products.

The company was inherited by two of his sons Hans and Gad Rausing. In 1996, Hans sold his half of the Tetra Laval Group to his brother, Gad, for a reported $7 billion. Gad's children Jörn, Finn, and Kirsten now own and control the Tetra Laval Group.

On Tuesday, 10 July 2012, Eva Rausing, wife of Hans Kristian Rausing and reputedly one of the richest women in the United Kingdom, was found dead at her home in Cadogan Place, Belgravia, London. Her husband, 49, was arrested in connection with her death and on suspicion of drug offences.

== Notable family members ==
- Ruben Rausing (1895–1983), son of August Andersson, businessman and industrialist, founder of Tetra Pak.
  - Elisabeth Rausing, wife of Ruben Rausing.
    - Gad Rausing (1922–2000), son of Ruben & Elisabeth Rausing, businessman.
      - Birgit Rausing (born 1924), widow of Gad Rausing.
        - Kirsten Rausing (born 1952), daughter of Gad & Birgit Rausing, businesswoman and racehorse owner/breeder.
        - Finn Rausing (born 1955), son of Gad & Birgit Rausing, businessman.
        - Jörn Rausing (born 1960), son of Gad & Birgit Rausing, businessman.
    - Hans Rausing (1926 - 2019), son of Ruben & Elisabeth Rausing, businessman.
      - Märit Rausing, wife of Hans Rausing.
        - Dame Lisbet Rausing (born 1960), daughter of Hans & Marit Rausing, philanthropist.
          - Peter Baldwin, husband of Lisbet Rausing.
        - Sigrid Rausing (born 1962), daughter of Hans & Marit Rausing, philanthropist.
          - Eric Abraham, husband of Sigrid Rausing.
        - Sir Hans Kristian Rausing (born 1963), son of Hans & Marit Rausing.
          - Eva Rausing (1964–2012), first wife of Hans K. Rausing.
          - Julia Delves Broughton, second wife of Hans K. Rausing, a Christie’s director.
    - Sven Rausing (1928–2003), son of Ruben & Elisabeth Rausing.

== Family tree ==
Kirsten Rausing (b. 1952)
Gad Rausing (1922–2000)
Ruben Rausing (1895–1983)	Finn Rausing (b. 1955)
Birgit Rausing (b. 1924)
Elisabeth Rausing	Jörn Rausing (b. 1960)
Hans Rausing (b. 1926-2019)	Lisbet Rausing (b. 1960)
Märit Rausing	Sigrid Rausing (b. 1962)
Eric Abraham
Hans Kristian Rausing (b. 1963)
Eva Kemeny (d. 2012)
Sven Rausing (1928–2003)
