= Sunday Times Rich List 2021 =

The Sunday Times Rich List 2021 is the 33rd annual survey of the wealthiest people resident in the United Kingdom, published by The Sunday Times online on 21 May 2021.

The list was edited by Robert Watts who succeeded long-term compiler Philip Beresford in 2017. He noted that "the fact many of the super-rich grew so much wealthier at a time when thousands of us have buried loved ones and millions of us worried for our livelihoods makes this a very unsettling boom."

The list was widely reported by other media.

== Top 10 fortunes ==
2021		Name	Citizenship	Source of wealth	2020	
Rank	Net worth £ bn	Name	Citizenship	Source of wealth	Rank	Net worth £ bn
01 ▲	£23.00 ▲	Sir Len Blavatnik	United States & United Kingdom	Investment, music and media	4	£15.781
02	£21.465 ▲	David and Simon Reuben	United Kingdom	Property and Internet	2=	£16.00
03 ▼	£17.00 ▲	Sri and Gopi Hinduja	India	Industry and finance	2=	£16.00
04 ▼	£16.30 ▲	Sir James Dyson and family	United Kingdom	Industry (Dyson)	1	£16.20
05 ▲	£14.68 ▲	Lakshmi Mittal and family	India	Steel	19	£6.781
06 ▲	£13.406 ▲	Alisher Usmanov	Russia	Mining and investment	7	£11.68
07 ▼	£13.00 ▲	Kirsten Rausing and Jörn Rausing	Sweden	Inheritance and investment (Tetra Pak)	6	£12.10
08 ▲	£12.101 ▲	Roman Abramovich	Russia & Israel	Oil and industry	12	£10.156
09	£12.013 ▲	Charlene de Carvalho-Heineken and Michel de Carvalho	Netherlands	Inheritance, banking, brewing (Heineken)	9	£10.30
10 ▼	£11.00 ▲	Guy, George, Alannah and Galen Weston and family	Canada & United Kingdom	Retailing	8	£10.53

== See also ==
- Forbes list of billionaires
