= Erik Wallenberg =

Swedish engineer (1915–1999)

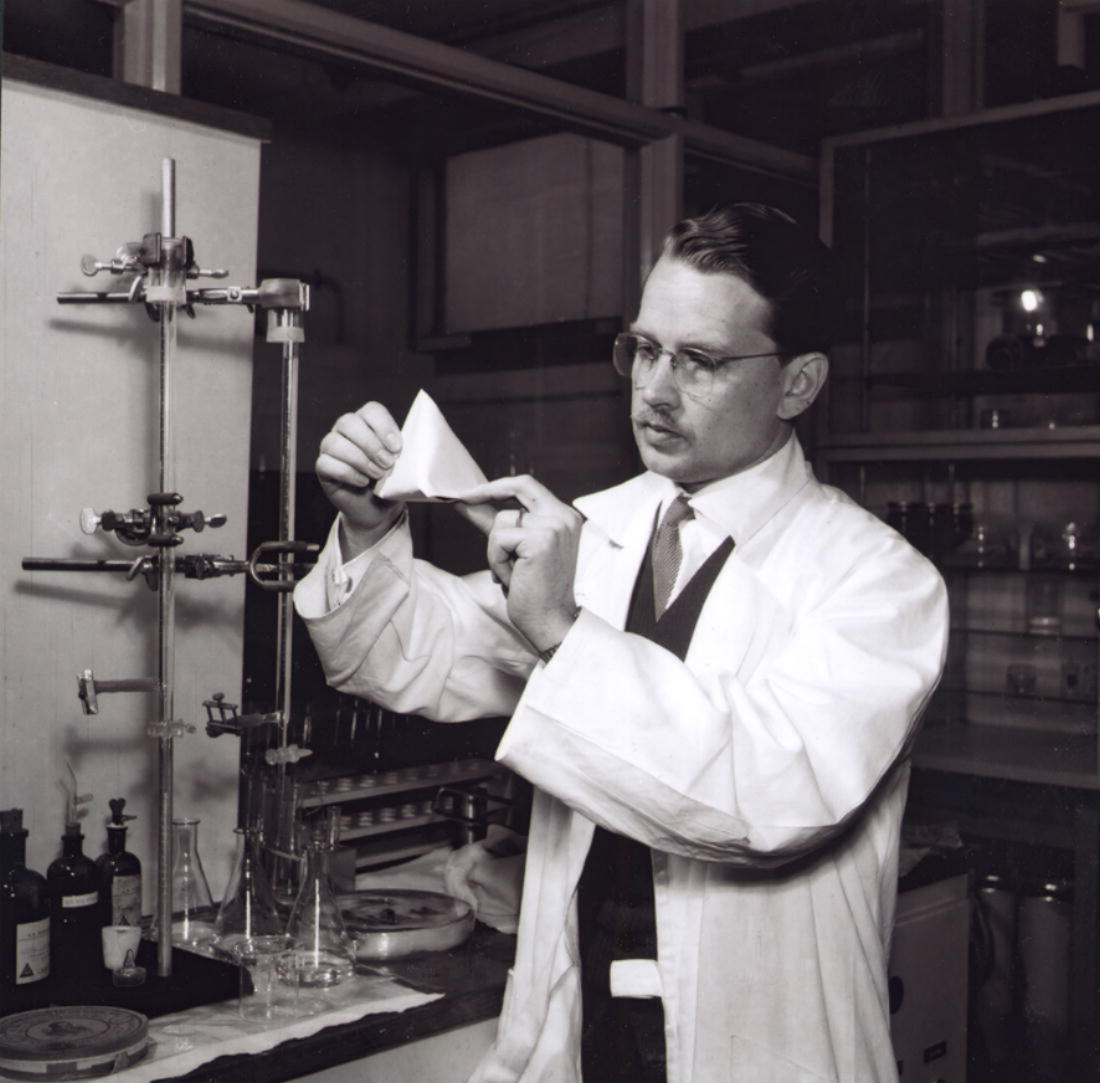
Erik Wallenberg with the tetrahedron package

Erik Wallenberg (25 December 1915 – 18 October 1999) was a Swedish engineer. He is credited for inventing the Tetra Pak tetrahedron packaging in 1944.

== Career ==
Wallenberg had initially planned to join the Army as an officer, but fell ill during military training and had to abandon his plans. He was accepted at Karolinska Institutet medical school in Stockholm, but decided to move to Lund and try to enter the medical school at Lund University instead.

In 1943, waiting to get accepted at Lund University, Wallenberg got a job as lab assistant at Åkerlund & Rausing, a local firm manufacturing food packaging. When his manager got drafted in 1944, he became head of the research lab, aged 28.

The team had orders from the company owner Ruben Rausing to produce a viable packaging for milk that was cheap enough to compete with the current milk distribution system, based on loose milk sold in reusable glass bottles. The key to this was to use as little packaging material as possible. The research lab had tried and failed a number of different solutions. Finally, reportedly when ill with fever, Wallenberg got the idea of using one single sheet of paper rolled into a cylinder and folded from two different sides, creating a mathematical tetrahedron. The volume created only needed to be sealed in three places and the packages could be produced in one subsequent sequence from one roll of paper, using a minimum of material, with a minimum of waste.

After some initial hesitation, Ruben Rausing became convinced that the invention was a good idea and ordered the project to be developed. In March 1944 he filed for a patent, and in 1951 Tetra Pak was created as a subsidiary to Åkerlund & Rausing. The tetrahedron package made Tetra Pak one of the world's most successful companies. The package is still sold today under the name of Tetra Classic Aseptic.

== Legacy ==
Upon visiting the Tetra Pak factory in Lund in the 1950s, Danish Nobel Prize winner and Physics professor Niels Bohr called the tetrahedron "a perfect practical application of a mathematical problem", and the invention lay the foundation of the Tetra Pak success saga. The Royal Swedish Academy of Engineering Sciences has called the Tetra Pak packaging system one of Sweden's most successful inventions of all times.

Despite the positive attention of the tetrahedron, Wallenberg did not get due recognition for the invention until 1991, when he was awarded the Grand Gold Medal by The Royal Swedish Academy of Engineering Sciences for "his ideas and efforts in the development of the packaging system Tetra Pak".
