= Lisbet Rausing =

Swedish-British philanthropist and historian of science

Dame Lisbet Rausing DBE
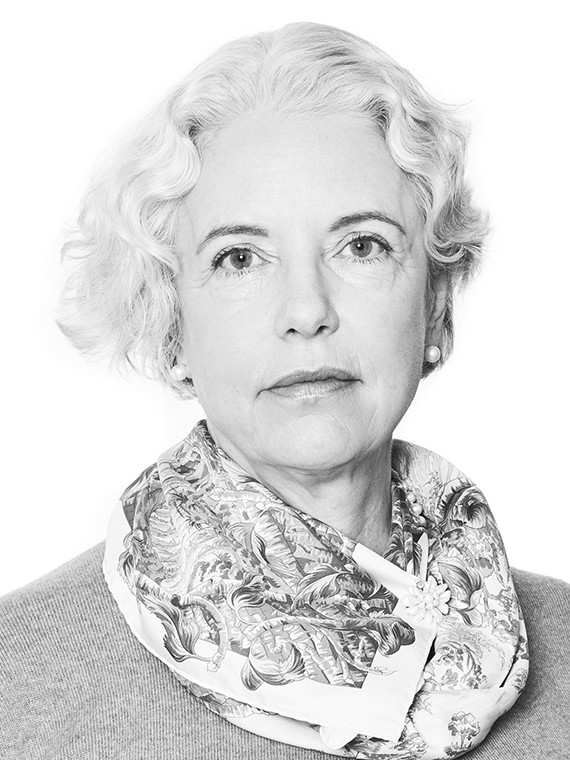
- Born: Anna Lisbet Kristina Rausing; 9 June 1960 (age 66); Lund, Sweden
- Citizenship: United Kingdom
- Education: UC Berkeley (BA); Harvard University (MA, PhD)
- Occupations: Science historian, philanthropist
- Spouse: Peter Baldwin
- Parents: Hans Rausing; Märit Rausing
- Relatives: Ruben Rausing (paternal grandfather); Hans Kristian Rausing (brother); Sigrid Rausing (sister)

Dame Anna Lisbet Kristina Rausing DBE (born 9 June 1960) is a British and Swedish science historian and philanthropist. She co-founded the Arcadia Fund, one of the UK's largest philanthropic foundations.

== Early life ==
Anna Lisbet Kristina Rausing, born on 9 June 1960 in Lund, Sweden, is a member of the wealthy Swedish Rausing family. She is the eldest child and daughter of Hans (1926–2019) and Märit Rausing, and has one sister, Sigrid Rausing (born 1962) and one brother, Sir Hans Kristian Rausing (born 1963). Her grandfather, Ruben Rausing (1895–1983), was co-founder of the Swedish multinational food packaging company Tetra Pak.

Rausing earned a B.A. degree summa cum laude in History from the University of California, Berkeley in 1984. She later pursued graduate studies at Harvard University, where she received a M.A. degree in History in 1987, followed by a Ph.D. in the same field in 1993.

== Career ==
Harvard University Press published Rausing's scholarly biography of Carl Linnaeus, Linnaeus: Nature and Nation in 1999. Throughout her career, she has published a range of articles on related subjects in scholarly journals including Isis, Representations, Configurations, and History of Political Economy. She has also contributed to the Financial Times and The Sunday Telegraph, and has published a number of pieces on the evolution of archive digitization and on open access to scholarship.

Rausing is a senior research fellow at King's College. She holds honorary doctorates from Uppsala University and SOAS. She is also an honorary fellow of the British Academy, the Linnean Society, the Royal Historical Society, The Royal Society of Biology and the Royal Swedish Academy of Agriculture and Forestry. She was elected to the Harvard Board of Overseers (2005–2011) and Yad Hanadiv Advisory Committee (2001–2011). She served on the Cambridge Conservation Initiative Advisory Board from 2012 to 2022.

== Philanthropy ==
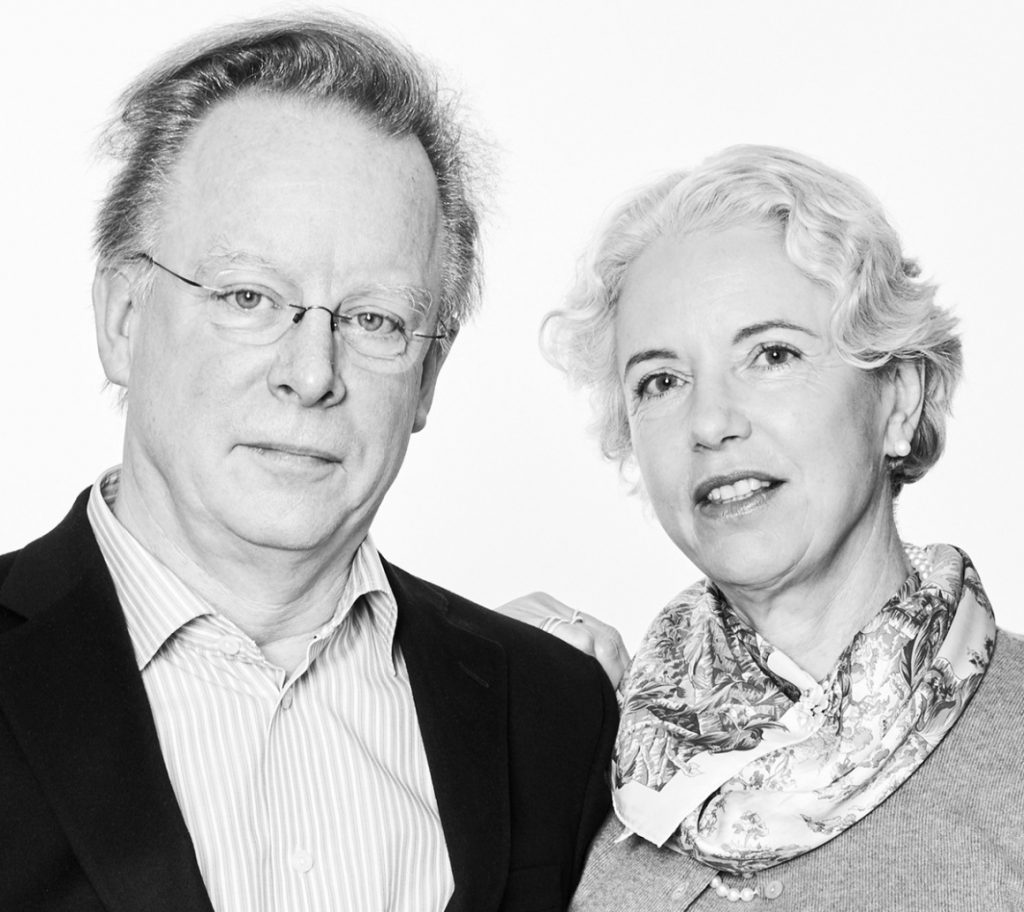
Rausing with her husband Peter Baldwin

Lisbet Rausing co-founded the Arcadia Fund in 2001 with her husband, Professor Peter Baldwin. As of March 2022, the Fund has made grant commitments of over $919 million to charities and scholarly institutions globally that preserve cultural heritage and the environment and promote open access. Arcadia-funded projects include the Endangered Languages Documentation Programme at Berlin Brandenburg Academy of Sciences and Humanities, the Endangered Archives Programme at the British Library and Fauna & Flora International's Halcyon Land and Sea fund. They are listed as one of the biggest benefactors to the Wikimedia Foundation and donated $5 million to the Wikimedia endowment in 2017 after Baldwin joined its advisory board.

Rausing is a long-term supporter of nature restoration in the Scottish Highlands.

Rausing and Baldwin also founded Lund Trust. Since 2002, Lund Trust has given more than $77.7 million to charities in the UK and internationally. In 2015, Rausing and Baldwin donated $25 million to Yale University to name the tower in Yale's Humanities Quadrangle after David F. Swensen.

In 2024, Rausing donated £500,000 to the Labour Party. The following year, in the 2025 Birthday Honours, Rausing was appointed a Dame Commander of the Order of the British Empire (DBE).

== See also ==
- Rausing family
