= Sigrid Rausing =

Swedish-British philanthropist, anthropologist and publisher (born 1962)

Sigrid Rausing FRSL
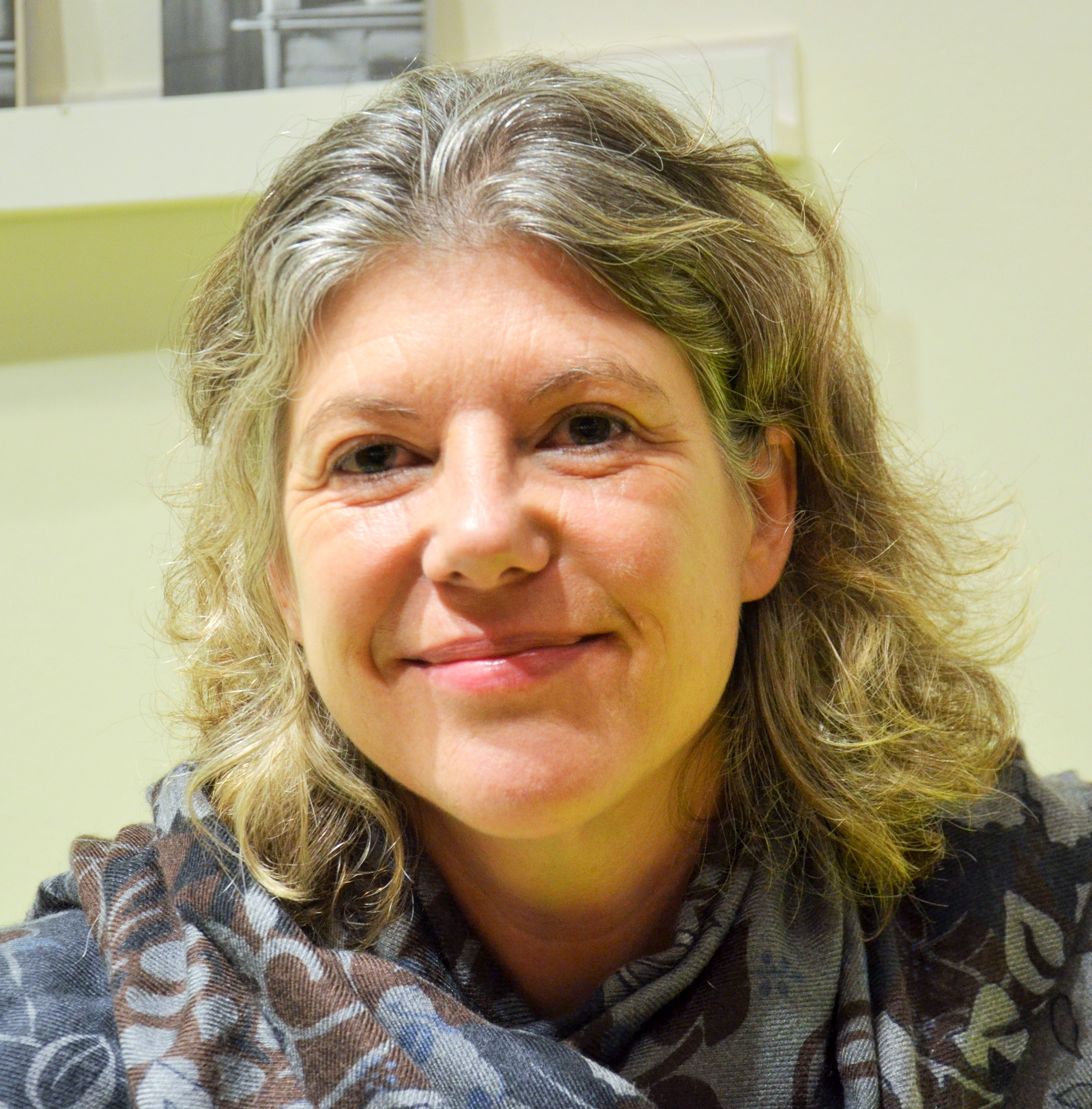
- Rausing in 2014
- Born: Sigrid Maria Elisabet Rausing; 29 January 1962 (age 64); Lund, Scania, Sweden
- Education: University of York; University College London
- Occupations: Author, publisher, philanthropist
- Spouse: Eric Abraham (m. 2003)
- Parent(s): Hans Rausing; Märit Rausing
- Relatives: Ruben Rausing (paternal grandfather); Hans Kristian Rausing (brother); Lisbet Rausing (sister)

Sigrid Maria Elisabet Rausing FRSL (born 29 January 1962) is a Swedish-British philanthropist, anthropologist and publisher. She is the founder of the Sigrid Rausing Trust, one of the United Kingdom's largest philanthropic foundations, and serves as a publisher of Granta magazine and Granta Books, which are owned by the Granta Trust, a charitable trust that she chairs.

== Early life ==
Sigrid Rausing is the daughter of Swedish businessman Hans Rausing and his wife Märit Rausing. She has one sister, Lisbet Rausing and one brother, Hans Kristian Rausing. Her grandfather Ruben Rausing was co-founder of the Swedish packaging company Tetra Pak.

Rausing grew up in Lund, Sweden, and studied history at the University of York between 1983 and 1986. She earned an MSc in social anthropology from University College London in 1987, then continued with a PhD focusing on post-Soviet anthropology, and did her fieldwork on a collective farm in Estonia, in 1993–94. In 1997, she was awarded a PhD in social anthropology from the Department of Social Anthropology at University College London, followed by an honorary post-doctorate in the same department.

== Career ==
=== Writing ===
Rausing's monograph based on her PhD, History, Memory, and Identity in Post-Soviet Estonia: The End of a Collective Farm, was published by Oxford University Press in 2004. The book was preceded by a range of articles in scholarly journals, including Ethnologie Française. Rausing writes occasional columns for the New Statesman, and her articles on human rights have appeared in The Guardian and The Sunday Times.In December 2025, she wrote in The Sunday Times in the article "Antisemitism is infecting human rights groups - my charity had to act", addressing challenges within the human rights sector and its public discourse.

Everything Is Wonderful, a personal memoir of her year in Estonia researching the remnants of the Estonian Swedish community, was published in the US and the UK by Grove Atlantic, and by Albert Bonniers Förlag in Sweden, in spring 2014. It was shortlisted for the Royal Society of Literature's Ondaatje Prize. Everything Is Wonderful was translated into several languages, including Swedish (published as Anteckningar från en kolchos by Albert Bonniers Förlag, 2014), Polish (Wszystko jest cudowne), French (Tout est merveilleux, Noir sur Blanc, 2014), and Estonian.

Rausing is also the author of Mayhem: A Memoir (2017), which was shortlisted for the Wellcome Book Prize in 2018. It has also been translated into a number of languages, including, Dutch, Spanish, Swedish, German and Danish.

Rausing co-wrote and translated Johanna Ekström's novel Och väggarna förvandlades till världen runtomkring (published by Albert Bonniers Förlag, 2022) into English as And the World Became the World All Around (published by Granta Books, 2024). The translation won the Warwick Prize for Women in Translation in 2025.

=== Publishing ===
In spring 2005, with her husband Eric Abraham and publisher Philip Gwyn-Jones, she founded the publishing house Portobello Books, and that autumn Rausing acquired Granta, a literary journal, and its book publishing arm. She is now the publisher of both Granta magazine and Granta Books, including its imprint Portobello Books. She served as Granta's editor from Issue 125 (After the War, Autumn 2013) to Issue 164 (Last Notes, Summer 2023). In the 164th issue of Granta magazine, for which she had served as editor since 2013, she announced that Thomas Meaney would take over editorship beginning with the Autumn 2023 issue.

=== Board and Governance Roles ===
Rausing is a former member of the Council of the Royal College of Art and served for two terms. She is an emeritus member of the international board of Human Rights Watch and of the advisory board of the Coalition for the International Criminal Court. She has served on numerous other boards, including Charleston Farmhouse, the historical museum home of Vanessa Bell and Duncan Grant, and the Cultural Council of Lund University. Rausing is also an Ambassador Council member of the Scholars at Risk Network.

== Recognition ==
In 2010, Rausing was made an Honorary Fellow of the London School of Economics.

In February 2013, Rausing was judged to be one of the 100 most powerful women in the United Kingdom by Woman's Hour on BBC Radio 4.

In January 2014, she was awarded an honorary doctorate by the University of York, from which she also received the Morrell Fellowship, and in June 2014, she was elected an Honorary Fellow of St Antony's College, Oxford.

In January 2016, Rausing was the guest on BBC Radio 4's Desert Island Discs. Her favourite music choice was Chopin’s "Études Op. 10, No. 1 in C major". Other choices were: "Hallelujah" by k.d. lang, "The Vatican Rag" by Tom Lehrer, "Bird on the Wire" by Leonard Cohen, "Sister Rosetta Goes Before Us" by Alison Krauss and Robert Plant, "The Last Goodbye" by The Kills, "I Get a Kick Out of You" by Ella Fitzgerald, and "Le Cygne (The Swan)" by Camille Saint-Saëns. Her book choice was Mansfield Park by Jane Austen and her luxury item was the British Library.

In 2016, she was awarded by the University of Kent the honorary degree of Doctor of Letters in recognition of her contribution to philanthropy and publishing.

In 2020, Rausing was elected a Fellow of the Royal Society of Literature (FRSL), and in 2021 she was awarded an Honorary Doctor of Literature (DLit) from University College London.

== Philanthropy ==
Rausing set up the charitable trust the Sea Foundation in 1988. In 1996, she transferred the funds to the Ruben and Elisabeth Rausing Trust, named after her grandparents; the trust was renamed the Sigrid Rausing Trust in 2003, and has distributed over £591 million to human rights organisations globally.

In 2004, she was the joint winner of the International Service Human Rights Award, in the Global Human Rights Defender category. In 2005, she won a Beacon Special Award for philanthropy. In 2006, she was awarded the Women's Funding Network's "Changing the Face of Philanthropy" Award.

Rausing is a judge on the jury of the Per Anger Prize for human rights defenders, and an emeritus board member of the Order of the Teaspoon, a Swedish organisation against political and religious extremism.

She was the judge of the Amnesty International Media Awards in 2009 and 2010. She is an Emeritus member of the international board of Human Rights Watch and of the advisory board of the Coalition for the International Criminal Court.

She is a former trustee of Charleston, in Sussex, the museum that is the former home of Duncan Grant and Vanessa Bell.

In 2012, she was a judge of the Index on Censorship Media Awards.

Rausing is a supporter of Hope Not Hate, a UK advocacy group that campaigns against racism and fascism. On 1 December 2018, the Sigrid Rausing Trust began a grant of £450,000 over three years to Hope Not Hate. By that point, Hope Not Hate had received £615,000 from the Sigrid Rausing Trust.

In 2024, Rausing was appointed vice-president of the Charleston Trust.

== Personal life ==
Rausing's first marriage to Dennis Hotz, a South African publisher and art dealer, ended in divorce. In 2003, she married South African-born TV, film and theatre producer Eric Abraham. They own Aubrey House in Holland Park, and the Coignafearn estate, in the Monadh Liath, in the Highlands of Scotland.

In 2024, Rausing donated £150,000 to the Labour Party.

== Bibliography ==
=== As author ===
- History, Memory, and Identity in Post-Soviet Estonia: The End of a Collective Farm. Oxford University Press. 2004. ISBN 978-0-19-926318-9.
- Everything is Wonderful: Memories of a Collective Farm in Estonia. Grove Atlantic, Inc. 14 March 2014. ISBN 978-0-8021-9281-3.
- Mayhem : a memoir. Hamish Hamilton. 2017. ISBN 978-0-241-25926-9.

=== As editor ===
- After the War. Granta 125. Granta. 2013. ISBN 9781905881710.
- American Wild. Granta 128. Granta. 2014. ISBN 9781905881819.
- Do You Remember. Granta 126. Granta. 2014. ISBN 9781905881796.

== See also ==
- Rausing family
