= Finn Rausing =

Swedish Billionaire Heir

- Born: 1954 (age 71–72)
- Education: INSEAD
- Occupations: Co-owner, Tetra Laval; Co-owner, Sauber Motorsport
- Parent(s): Gad Rausing; Birgit Rausing
- Relatives: Ruben Rausing (grandfather); Kirsten Rausing (sister); Jörn Rausing (brother)

Finn Rausing (born 1954) is a Swedish billionaire heir and businessman. He is a co-owner of Tetra Laval, the packaging company, and formerly a co-owner of Sauber Motorsport and the Alfa Romeo Formula One team, before selling the team to Audi in 2024.

== Early life ==
Finn Rausing is the son of Gad Rausing and Birgit Rausing. Rausing earned an MBA from INSEAD.

== Career ==
According to Forbes, Rausing has a net worth of $8.0 billion, as of October 2019.

== Personal life ==
Rausing lives in England.
