= Tetra Brik =

Carton beverage package

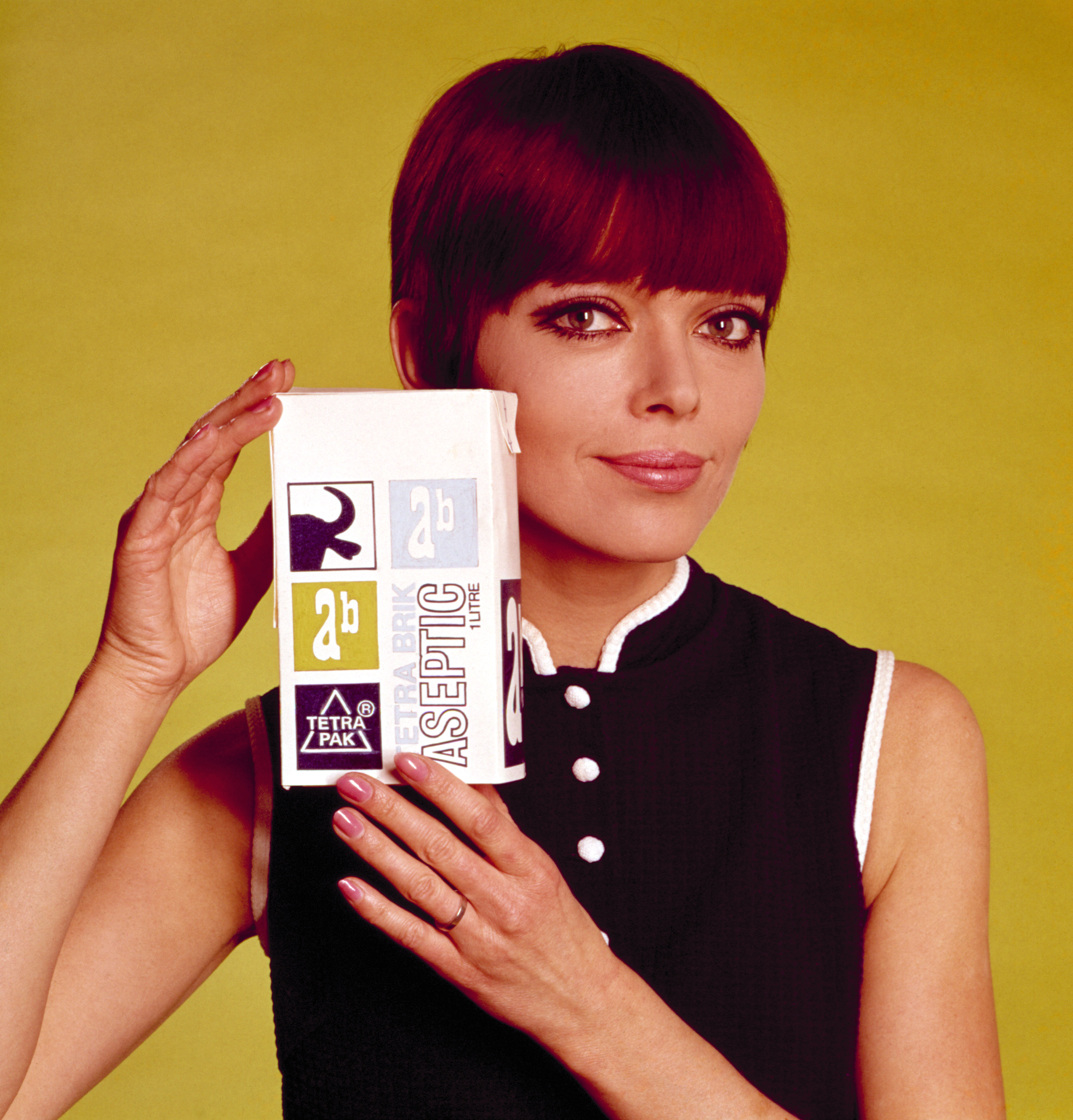
Tetra Brik Aseptic, 1960s

Tetra Brik is a brand name for a carton package produced by the Swedish packaging company Tetra Pak. Its shape is cubic or cuboid, and it is available with or without various different caps. The Tetra Brik is the best-known and most sold package in the Tetra Pak packaging family, to the extent that Tetra Brik is sometimes mistaken for the brand name. The Tetra Brik comes in either chilled (Tetra Brik) or ambient (Tetra Brik Aseptic) package types.

== History ==
The Tetra Brik package was introduced in 1963, after a long process of development and built on the previous Tetra Classic tetrahedron package that laid the foundation for Tetra Pak. Despite the revolutionary character of the new retail system, by the end of the 1950s Ruben Rausing and the Tetra Pak management team realised that the Tetra Pak package portfolio needed to be supplemented by an additional rectangular model to continue to be competitive.

Large amounts were spent on development, and in 1963 the first Tetra Brik packaging machine was installed in Motala in central Sweden. Due to its effective use of space and materials and the increased efficiency in distribution and storage that resulted from the rectangular shape, the Tetra Brik soon became Tetra Pak's best seller in Sweden and internationally and paved the way for Tetra Pak's enormous success during the 1970s and onwards.

The Tetra Brik package family has since been extended and is currently composed of Tetra Brik and Tetra Brik Aseptic in the shapes Base, Square and Edge, ranging from volumes of 80 to 2000 ml and with a number of different caps.

Tetra Brik has been distinguished as one of the 20th century's design icons. It featured in the 2004 Museum of Modern Art New York exhibition Humble Masterpieces and in the 2011 London Science Museum/Vitra Design Museum exhibition Hidden Heroes – The Genius of Everyday Things. It is now part of the permanent collection at the MoMA in New York.

== Tetra Brik Aseptic ==
The Tetra Brik Aseptic came onto the market in 1969 and soon became Tetra Pak's flagship package. Due to the aseptic technology, there was no longer a need for a cold chain, which made the package economical and suitable for warmer climates, something that greatly expanded potential markets.

== See also ==
- Juice box
