= Kirsten Rausing =

Swedish businesswoman (born 1952)

Kirsten Rausing CBE DL
- Born: 6 June 1952 (age 74); Lund, Sweden
- Occupation: philanthropist
- Known for: 33.3% stake in Tetra Laval
- Parent(s): Gad Rausing; Birgit Rausing
- Relatives: Ruben Rausing (grandfather); Finn Rausing (brother); Jörn Rausing (brother)

Eva Kirsten Elisabet Rausing CBE DL (born 6 June 1952) is a Swedish-British businesswoman, who owns a third of the holding company Tetra Laval and sits on the company board alongside other members of her family.

She was listed as the 150th richest individual in the world in the Forbes 2020 list of The World's Billionaires.

== Early life ==
Born in Lund, Sweden, Rausing is the eldest child of Swedish industrialist Gad Rausing (1922–2000) and his wife Birgit (née Mayne). She is the granddaughter of Ruben Rausing (1895–1983) who was the founder of the liquid food packaging company Tetra Pak. Her father bought out the 50% share in the company from his brother Hans Rausing in 1995, leaving her side of the family as sole remaining owner of Tetra Pak. She is the granddaughter of Swedish landscape painter Henry Mayne (1891–1975).

== Career ==
With her brothers Jörn Rausing and Finn Rausing, she sits on the board of holding company Tetra Laval.

Rausing is a member of the Jockey Club and a former director of The National Stud. With Richard Frisby, Michael Goodbody and Guy Heald, she is a director of the British Bloodstock Agency, which buys and sells racehorses on behalf of wealthy clients. Rausing owns Staffordstown Stud in County Meath, Ireland.

Rausing, along with her brothers Finn Rausing and Jörn Rausing, holds a 20% stake in International Flavors & Fragrances, which sells scents used in fizzy drinks, perfumes and other consumer products.

== Personal life ==
Rausing lives in the UK and breeds horses at her stud farm Lanwades Stud in Newmarket. She founded the Alborada Trust which gives funding for medical and veterinary causes, research, education, animal welfare, and relief to areas of the world hit by disaster.

Rausing is one of Britain's richest women. In the Sunday Times Rich List 2021 ranking of the wealthiest people in the UK she was placed 7th (jointly with her brother Jörn) with an estimated fortune of £13 Billion.

She has never married and has no children. She is a Conservative Party donor.

She was appointed as a Deputy Lieutenant for the County of Suffolk on 18 November 2016. This entitled her to the Post Nominal Letters "DL" for life.

== See also ==
- Rausing family
