= Lars Renström =

Swedish industrialist

Lars Sture Renström (born 8 May 1951) is a Swedish industrialist.

Renström graduated with a Master of Science in Engineering from the Royal Institute of Technology and also holds a Bachelor of Science in Business Administration and Economics.

During the 1980s and 1990s, he worked within ABB and Ericsson. In 1997 Renström became president and Head of Division within Atlas Copco, and 2000 he was made CEO of Seco Tools. From 2004 to 2016, Renström was president and CEO of Alfa Laval. In 2016 he became chairman of Tetra Laval. Renström is chairman of Assa Abloy. Renström is reported to have attended the Bilderberg Group meeting and World Economic Forum.

== Awards ==
- His Majesty The King's Medal: 12th size on Seraphim Order ribbon
- Knight of The Legion of Honour
- Harvard Business Review: Best-Performing CEOs in the World
