= DeLaval =

Machine production company

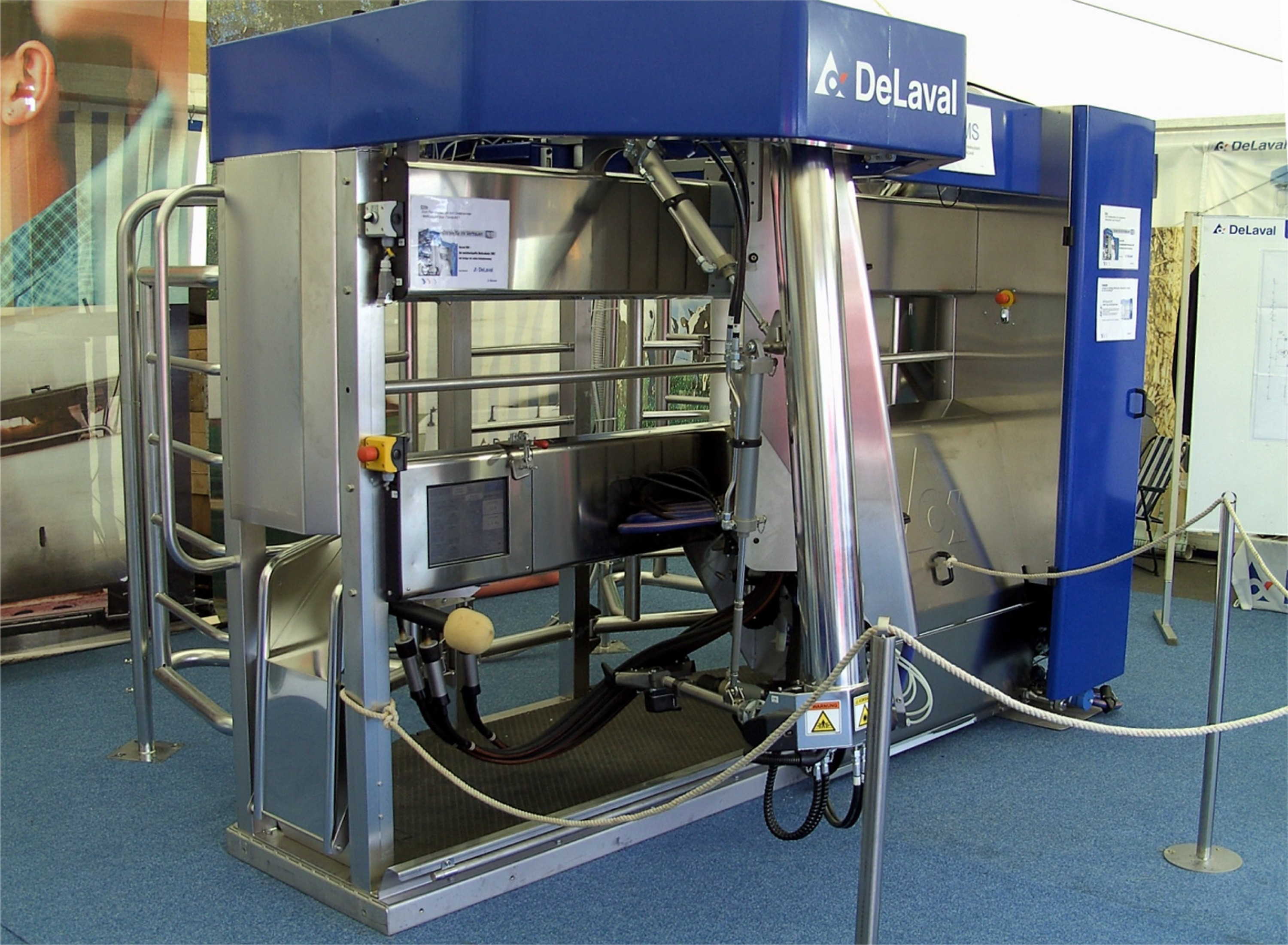
DeLaval automatic milking system (AMS)

DeLaval is a producer of dairy and farming machinery, with a head office in Tumba, Sweden, and is part of the Tetra Laval group. The company has 18 factories worldwide and employs over 4,500 people.

== History ==
From the 1870s Gustaf de Laval (1845–1913) developed machines for the dairy industry, including the first centrifugal milk-cream separator and early milking machines. His first separator was patented in 1887, and his first milking machine in 1894. From the early 1880s, De Laval's cream separator, was promoted internationally. For example, the London-based Dairy Supply Co presented the cream separator at the 1891 Dairy Show in London.

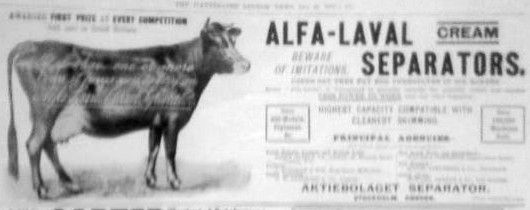
Advert from 1899

In 1883, DeLaval and Oscar Lamm founded Aktiebolaget Separator (abbreviated to AB Separator) in Stockholm, Sweden. In the first year the company built 53 milk separators, of which 37 were exported.

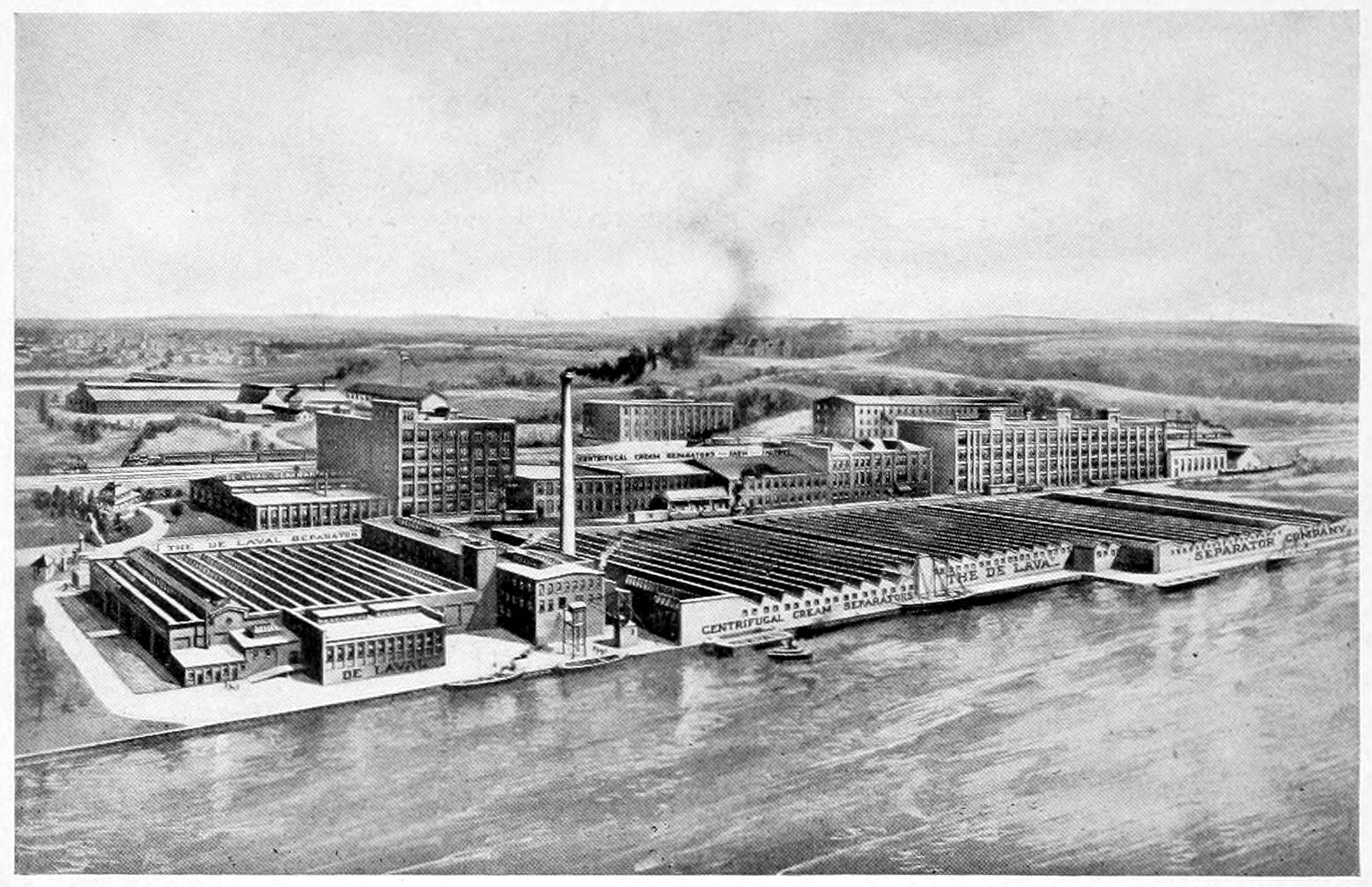
De Laval Separator Company, Poughkeepsie, N. Y., 1920

In 1888 in the US the company founded the De Laval Cream Separator Co. as a subsidiary, with a sales office in New York and production facility in Poughkeepsie, New York. Another company that Gustaf de Laval founded in the United States in 1901 was the De Laval Steam Turbine Company in Trenton, New Jersey.

In Sweden, AB Separator opened their first dairy factory in Hamra in 1898, and three years later a "big barn" working farm at Hamra Farm, Sweden. In 1903 the company initiated the agricultural national fair, and in 1911 the International Dairy Congress. In 1943 they opened the Hamra Agricultural School. In 1985 the Hamra Farm became a separate company.

The company started marketing the first commercially practical milking machine in 1918, after Gustaf de Laval's death in 1913. In 1963 the company was renamed from AB Separator to Alfa-Laval (spelled with a hyphen until 1993). In 1991 Alfa-Laval was bought by Tetra Pak. In 1993 the division which produced dairy and farming machinery was split from Alfa Laval and named Alfa Laval Agri. Both companies became part of the Tetra Laval Group. In 2000 the Tetra Laval Group sold Alfa Laval, while Alfa Laval Agri was kept and renamed DeLaval after the company's founder. Alfa Laval continues with specialized products and solutions for heavy industry.

In 2020, DeLaval bought the "milkrite | InterPuls" milking equipment business from British company Avon Rubber.

== Publications ==
- De Laval separator company. De Laval whey separators. (1920)
