= Jane Kershaw =

Medieval archaeologist and academic

Jane Kershaw FSA
- Born: 1982 (age 43–44)
- Occupation: Archaeologist
- Awards: Leverhulme Early Career Fellowship

Academic background
- Education: University of Oxford
- Thesis: (2010)

Academic work
- Discipline: Archaeology
- Institutions: Oxford archaeology

Jane Frances Kershaw FSA (b. 1982) is a British archaeologist and academic. She is the Gad Rausing Associate Professor of Viking Age Archaeology at the University of Oxford. Her research focusses on Viking Age archaeology, particularly on metalworking and the bullion economy in Viking England.

== Biography ==
Kershaw has an undergraduate degree in history from the University of Oxford and then studied at Harvard University before returning to Oxford for her PhD. Her 2010 PhD thesis was titled Culture and gender in the Danelaw: Scandinavian and Anglo-Scandinavian brooches, 850-1050 and was supervised by Helena Hamerow. Kershaw was awarded a studentship in Archaeology at Queen's College, Oxford in 2010. In 2011 she received a Post-Doctoral Fellowship at Oxford from the British Academy to continue research into the bullion economy of Viking England. She held a Junior Research Fellowship at Balliol College, Oxford in 2014 and was awarded a Leverhulme Trust from 2017–2019 to study Britain's Viking silver hoards.

Kershaw has undertaken excavations at Coquet Valley, Northumberland. She has written for The Conversation and British Archaeology. Kershaw appeared on an episode of In Our Time in March 2019 about 'The Danelaw'.

Kershaw was elected as a Fellow of the Society of Antiquaries of London on 15 May 2024.

== Select publications ==
- Kershaw, J., Merkel, S., Woods, A., Evans, J., Pashley, V., Chenery, S. 2025. "The Provenance of Silver in the Viking‐Age Hoard From Bedale, North Yorkshire", Archaeometry doi:10.1111/arcm.70031.
- Savage, C., Naismith, R., Merkel, S., Kershaw, J. 2025. "Sources of silver in twelfth-century northern English and Scottish coins: a preliminary look", British Nusmismatic Journal 94, 87–100.
- Kershaw, J., Merkel, S., Naismith, R. 2024. "Byzantine plate and Frankish mines: the provenance of silver in north-west European coinage during the Long Eighth Century (c. 660–820)", Antiquity 98 (398), 502–517.
- Kershaw, J., Merkel, S.W., Oravisjärvi, J., Kooijman, E., Kielman-Schmitt, M. 2021. "The scale of dirham imports to the Baltic in the ninth century: new evidence from archaeometric analyses of early Viking-Age silver", Fornvännen 116 (3), 185–204.
- Kershaw, J. 2016. "Scandinavian-style metalwork from southern England: new light on the ‘First Viking Age’ in Wessex", in Lavelle, R. and Roffey, S. (eds). Danes in Wessex: the Scandinavian impact on southern England, c.800-c.1100, Oxford, Oxbow.
