= Greatview =

Chinese packaging company

- Company type: Public
- Industry: Food packaging
- Founded: Beijing, China (2003)
- Founder: Jeff Bi, Hong Gang
- Headquarters: Beijing, China
- Area served: Worldwide
- Key people: Jeff Bi (CEO); Hong Gang
- Revenue: ▲¥;2.1595 billion (2013)
- Number of employees: 1,250 + (2013)
- Website: Greatviewpack.com/

Greatview Aseptic Packaging Company is a multinational aseptic processing company with its head office based in Beijing, China. Founded in 2003, Greatview offers aseptic carton solutions and related services for dairy and non-carbonated soft drink companies whose products are compatible with Tetra Brik Aseptic filling machines. Greatview presently has three packaging facilities worldwide, two of which are located in China, in Gaotang, Shandong and Helingeer, Inner Mongolia; the third facility is the company's primary exporting facility and is located in Germany, in the city of Halle (Saale), Saxony-Anhalt.

Originally named "Tralin Pak″, the company was initially engaged in the production and sale of multi-layered compound packaging materials, paper cartons and other paper packages for beverage companies in the PRC, but re-established as a manufacturer of aseptic packs after its current CEO, Mr. Jeff Bi and Chairman, Mr. Hong Gang joined the company in 2003.

== Breaking Monopoly ==
Greatview's early years in the PRC were difficult, which was largely owing to Tetra Pak's hostile tactics in trying to eliminate competition in the monopoly market between 2003 and 2005. However, by the end of that year, rapid expansion in China's dairy industry had meant that a capacity bottleneck occurred at Tetra Pak China, and Greatview seized the opportunity of supplying cartons to some of Tetra Pak's smaller customers, which turned to Greatview as an alternative supplier.

Though the bottleneck offered a crucial lifeline for Greatview, Tetra Pak's tying and bundling competitive strategy with exclusivity restrictions on customers continued to hamper the company's progress. It wasn't until August 2008, however - when China's Anti-Monopoly Law came into effect - that Greatview was able to grow and turn the aseptic packaging industry into a new playing field.

== Expansion in China ==
In 2005, CDH Investments became Greatview's main investor, and the following year, Bain Capital followed with a US $40 million investment, gaining a 43.2% stake in the company. During the following three years, the aseptic carton industry in the PRC grew substantially, with a compound annual growth rate of 12.8%. Greatview's per unit production cost had been 5-10% lower than the market leader, which led to Greatview's market share in the PRC growing from 7% in 2008 to 13% in 2012 as it took market share mainly from Tetra Pak.

== Entry into Europe ==
After beginning operations in Europe in 2007, Greatview listed on the Hong Kong stock exchange in 2010, and in 2011, it made a 50 million euro investment to build a factory in the German town of Halle (Saale), in Saxony-Anhalt. The factory launch took place on June 25, 2013 in front of 200 or so special guests, amongst whom were customers, suppliers and government officials.
