= Gad Rausing =

Swedish industrialist and archaeologist (1922–2000)

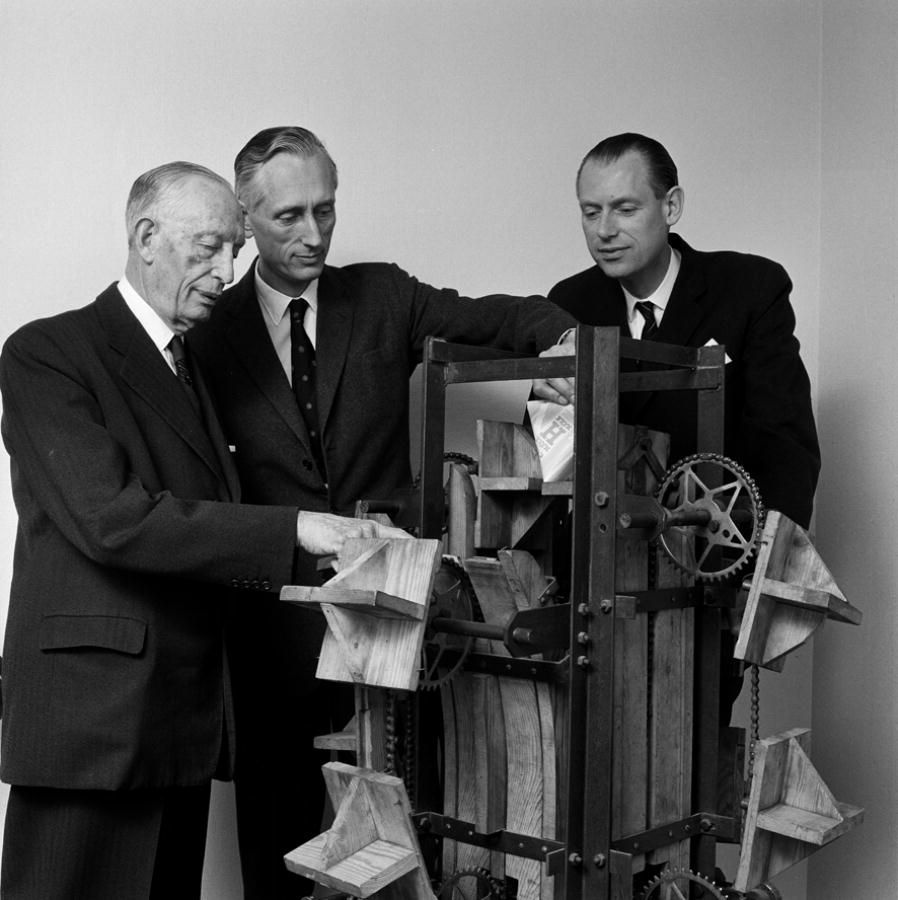
Ruben, Gad and Hans Rausing with the first Tetra Pak filling machine prototype, 1967

Gad Rausing (19 May 1922 – 28 January 2000) was a Swedish industrialist and archaeologist. Together with his brother Hans, he inherited the Swedish packaging company Tetra Pak, founded by their father Ruben Rausing, and by 2011, the largest food packaging company in the world by sales. In 1995, Gad bought out his brother's interest in the company in what was at the time the most extensive private buyout in Europe.

Rausing had a lifelong passion for archaeology and the humanities and was an accomplished scholar, earning his PhD from the University of Lund in 1967 with a dissertation on Scandinavian prehistoric bows and arrowheads. In addition to his work as deputy managing director at Tetra Pak he was a frequent lecturer at the Institute of Archaeology at Lund University and the author of several books.

== Early life ==
Rausing was born in Bromma, outside of Stockholm, in 1922 as the eldest son of industrialist Ruben Rausing and his wife Elisabeth (née Varenius). He had two younger brothers, Hans and Sven.

== Career ==
Rausing studied chemistry at the University of Lund and began his career as the head of the research laboratory at Åkerlund & Rausing, his father's company, where he was in charge of the team developing suitable materials for the newly invented tetrahedron package. The tetrahedron subsequently became the central product of Tetra Pak, which was founded in 1951 as a subsidiary to Åkerlund & Rausing.

Rausing joined Tetra Pak as deputy managing director in 1954. Over the years, the company evolved from a small family business with six full-time employees in 1954 into a multinational corporation with over 20,000 employees (2011), a development much of which has been credited to the leadership of Rausing and his brother throughout the 1960s and 1970s. The great success of the business was largely the result of their development of aseptic packaging technology, developed in the 1950s and early 1960s and later called the most important food packaging innovation of the 20th century.

Rausing had a parallel career as a scholar in prehistoric Scandinavian archaeology and was a reader at the Institute of Archaeology at Lund University. Asked how he could uphold a position in senior management of a global corporation and do archaeological research at the same time, he stated "a fair number of left-over hours in airports and planes" as his key to finding the time.

== Patronage ==
Rausing's passion for the humanities led to his frequent sponsorship of various research projects, among others the excavation of the 10th Century Viking trading town of Birka outside Stockholm. Rausing's foundation, The Birgit and Gad Rausing Foundation, awards grants to research within the humanities and supports several important institutions, among others Lund and Oxford universities.

In 2002, the Gad Rausing Prize for Outstanding Humanistic Research was instituted by Rausing's three children in memory of their father at the Royal Swedish Academy of Letters, History and Antiquities, where Gad Rausing was a member during his lifetime. Rausing became Doctor Honoris Causa at the Royal Institute of Technology in Stockholm in 1983.

In 2024, the University of Oxford established the Gad Rausing Associate Professorship of Viking Age Archaeology, funded by a gift from Gad's daughter, Kirsten. Jane Kershaw was named the inaugural post-holder.

== Gad and Birgit Rausing Library ==
The Lahore University of Management Sciences (LUMS) library has been renamed as Gad & Birgit Rausing Library to acknowledge the donation provided by the Rausing family to construct the library building. Dennis Jönsson, the CEO of Tetra Pak, inaugurated the library on 17 March 2011, noting that the Rausing family funds were utilized for educational purposes and unveiled a plaque commemorating the Rausing family's donation.

== Personal life ==
Gad Rausing was married to Birgit Rausing and had three children, Finn, Jörn, and Kirsten.

== Legacy ==
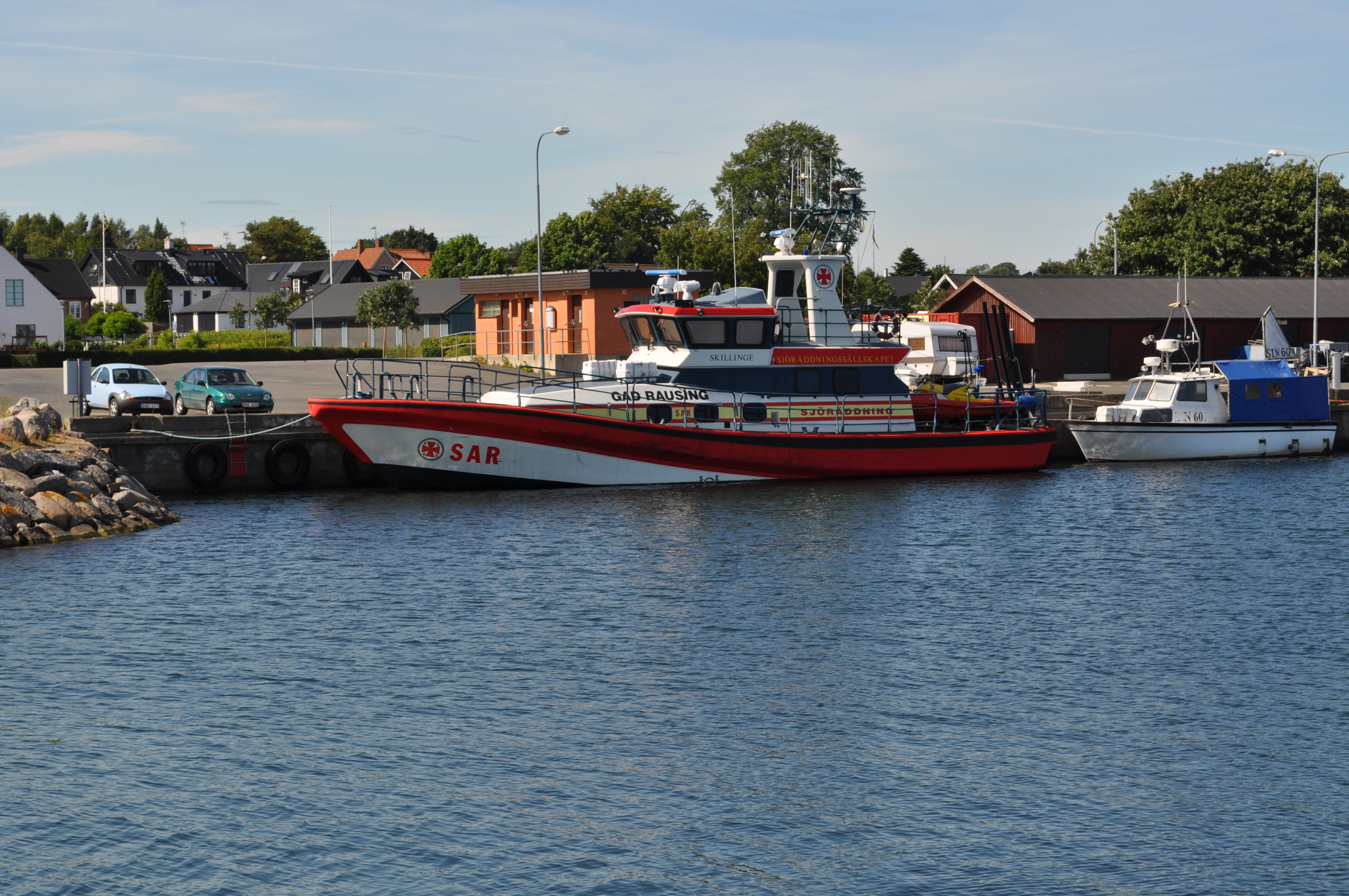
Rescue Cruiser Gad Rausing

The Swedish Sea Rescue Society has a class of rescue vessels where the lead ship, Gad Rausing, was built in 2002 after a large donation from the Tetra Laval group.

== Selected bibliography ==
- Rausing, Gad, China and Europe: some notes on communications in early times, Lund: Tetra Pak International, 1996
- Rausing, Gad, Prehistoric boats and ships of northwestern Europe: some reflections, Malmö: Liber Förlag/Gleerup, 1984
- Rausing, Gad, Ecology, economy and man, Malmö: Liber Läromedel/Gleerup, 1981
- Rausing, Gad, The bow: some notes on its origin and development, Lund: Gleerups, 1967
- Rausing, Gad, Lars Lawskis vapensamling, Norrköping: Norrköpings museum, 1960
