= Tetra Laval =

Swiss-based food packaging corporation

Tetra Laval is a Swiss-domiciled multinational corporation of Swedish origin, with headquarters in Pully (Vaud), Switzerland. The Tetra Laval Group provides packaging, processing and distribution products for a range of foodstuffs, including liquids, fruit and vegetables, ice-cream and processed food, additionally offering systems for agricultural production and herd management. The group operates in five business segments: milk production, food preparation, food processing, food packaging and food distribution. The Tetra Laval Group includes Tetra Pak, DeLaval, and Sidel and is owned by the Rausing family. Tetra Laval was included in the Thomson Reuters 2011 list of Top 100 Global Innovators.

== The Tetra Laval Group ==
The Tetra Laval Group consists of three independent industry groups. Tetra Pak develops and manufactures processing, distribution and packaging systems for food and liquids. DeLaval develops and produces systems for milk production and animal husbandry. Sidel develops and manufactures plastic packaging and complete bottling lines.

Tetra Laval AB operates as a subsidiary to the holding company Tetra Laval International SA. Tetra Laval International SA provides the financing, risk management and investment support needed by the Tetra Laval Group, with the additional responsibility of managing overall legal and financial structure and tax planning.

== History ==
Tetra Pak was created in Sweden in 1944 by Ruben Rausing.

The Tetra Laval Group was created in 1993 after Tetra Pak's acquisition of Alfa Laval in 1991 with the aim of forming a coherent structure under which both companies could operate within their respective fields. The part of Alfa Laval that was involved in processing was integrated into Tetra Pak, while the part that produced farm equipment was recreated as a separate entity under the name of Alfa Laval Agri, later renamed DeLaval after Alfa Laval's founder Gustaf de Laval.

In 2000, Tetra Laval sold the part of Alfa Laval that was not directly involved in their business to Swedish investment company Industri Kapital, however retaining a part of the shares. In 2001, Tetra Laval acquired French plastic bottle manufacturer Sidel. The merger was subject to anti-competitivity scrutiny from the European Commission but was finally allowed to go through after an appeal to the European Court of Justice.

== Facts and figures ==
Employees in 2019:

Tetra Pak	25,488
Sidel	5,487
DeLaval	4,637
Other	270
Tetra Laval Group	35,882

Net sales 2019 (m€):

Tetra Pak	11,220
Sidel	1,415
DeLaval	1,010
Other	0
Tetra Laval Group	13,635

== Environment ==
The Tetra Laval Group has an established policy for environmental excellence and sustainability. However, Tetra Pak products have been identified as solid waste problems by many NGOs and environmental groups. Unlike aluminum cans, plastic or glass bottles, it cannot be recycled in municipal recycling facilities. In order to stave off regulation, the company has engineered a strong campaign. In 2011, Tetra Pak published a set of sustainability targets, which included maintaining its emission levels at the same level until 2020 and increasing recycling by 100 percent.

== Supervisory Board ==
- Lars Renström
- Paul Conway
- Nigel Higgins
- Ola Källenius
- Jorma Ollila
- Bernd Pischetsrieder
- Finn Rausing
- Jörn Rausing
- Kirsten Rausing
