= Hans Rausing =

Swedish industrialist and philanthropist (1926–2019)

Hans Rausing KBE
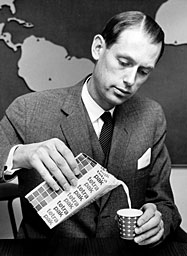
- Hans Rausing with Tetra Brik, 1963
- Born: 25 March 1926; Gothenburg, Sweden
- Died: 30 August 2019 (aged 93); London, England
- Education: Lund University
- Occupations: Businessman, philanthropist
- Known for: Tetra Pak
- Spouse: Märit Rausing
- Children: Lisbet, Sigrid, and Hans Kristian Rausing
- Parent: Ruben Rausing
- Family: Rausing family

Hans Anders Rausing (25 March 1926 – 30 August 2019) was a Swedish industrialist and philanthropist based in the United Kingdom. His fortune derived from his co-inheritance of Tetra Pak, a company founded by his father Ruben Rausing, and the largest food packaging company in the world. In the early 1980s Rausing moved to the United Kingdom to avoid Swedish taxes, in 1995 he sold his share of the company to his brother, Gad.

In the Forbes world fortune ranking, Rausing was placed at number 83 with an estimated fortune of US$10 billion in 2011. According to Forbes, he was the second richest Swedish billionaire in 2013. By the time of his death in August 2019, Forbes estimated the net worth of Rausing and his family to be $12 billion.

== Early life ==
Rausing was born in Gothenburg in 1926, the second son of industrialist Ruben Rausing and his wife Elisabeth (née Varenius). Rausing had two brothers, Gad and Sven.

== Career ==
Rausing studied economics, Statistics, and Russian at Lund University, graduating in 1948. In 1954, Rausing was appointed managing director of Tetra Pak, and his brother Gad was appointed deputy managing director. Rausing became chairman in 1985. He left the company in 1993, and sold his 50% share of the company to Gad in 1995.

Tetra Pak's success in the 1970s and 1980s has been credited to the leadership of Hans and Gad Rausing, who turned the six-person family business into a multinational company. Over the course of his career, Rausing became a specialist in Russian affairs and made many investments in Russia and Ukraine. He was responsible for Tetra Pak's Russian market, and negotiated the first Tetra Pak machine export to the Soviet Union in 1959, eventually making Tetra Pak the largest foreign employer in Russia.

== Patronage ==
Hans Rausing and his wife Märit donated large sums to charities and research in the UK and Sweden, among others, to large medical research projects at Karolinska Institutet and Lund University. Through the Märit and Hans Rausing Fund, they supported local community projects in their home county of Sussex.

Through her fund Arcadia, Rausing's daughter Lisbet is financing the Hans Rausing Endangered Languages Project at the School of Oriental and African Studies (SOAS) at the University of London, the Hans Rausing Scholarship in the History of Science at King's College London, and the Hans Rausing Chair in the History of Science at Uppsala University, which is also hosting an annual Hans Rausing Lecture in the History of Science. The University of Cambridge Department of History and Philosophy of Science hosts an Annual Hans Rausing Lecture.

== Honours and UK tax status ==
Hans Rausing received an honorary doctorate from Lund University. He was a visiting professor at Mälardalens Högskola, Sweden, and honorary professor at the University of Dubna, Russia. He was made an Honorary Knight Commander of the Order of the British Empire (KBE) in 2006. He was an honorary fellow of the Isaac Newton Institute, Cambridge, and in 2011 was made an honorary freeman and liveryman at the Worshipful Company of Stationers and Newspaper Makers, London. An article in the Guardian described how Hans Rausing had taken advantage of the UK's "remittance basis" of taxation to reduce his UK tax exposure while a UK resident. In 2002, for example, he earned income of around £225M but, according to the report, he incurred UK income tax on only £1M of it, because most of it arose outside the UK and therefore, because he did not "remit" it to the UK, the remittance basis meant he did not incur UK tax on it.

== Personal life ==
Hans Rausing and his wife Märit Rausing had two daughters, Lisbet and Sigrid, and one son, Hans Kristian Rausing.

From 2001 to 2012, Rausing and his family donated £886,000 to the UK's Conservative Party.

Rausing was a resident of the UK from 1982 until his death. He lived at The New House, Wadhurst Park, East Sussex, until his death on 30 August 2019.
