= Jörn Rausing =

Swedish billionaire heir

- Born: 12 February 1960 (age 66)
- Occupations: Co-owner, Tetra Laval; Director, Ocado
- Parent(s): Gad Rausing; Birgit Rausing
- Relatives: Ruben Rausing (grandfather); Kirsten Rausing (sister); Finn Rausing (brother)

Jörn Rausing (born 12 February 1960) is a Swedish businessman. He is a co-owner of Tetra Laval, the packaging company which was founded by his grandfather Ruben Rausing.

In 2021, the Sunday Times Rich List estimated his joint net worth with Kirsten Rausing at £13 billion.

== Early life ==
Jörn Rausing is the son of Gad Rausing and Birgit Rausing.

== Career ==
As well as Tetra Laval, he owns a share of Ocado, where he is a board director. In 2003, Rausing made a £26.5 million investment in Ocado, with his stake now being worth £1.4 billion.

Rausing, along with his sister Kirsten Rausing and his brother Finn Rausing, hold a 20% stake in International Flavors & Fragrances, which sells scents used in fizzy drinks, perfumes and other consumer products.

== Personal life ==
Rausing lives in Surrey, England.
