= Ruben Rausing =

Swedish industrialist

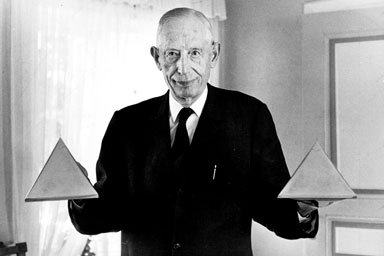
- Rausing in 1965
- Born: Anders Ruben Andersson; 17 June 1895; Råå, Sweden
- Died: 10 August 1983 (aged 88); Simontorp, Sweden
- Education: Stockholm School of Economics; Columbia University
- Known for: Founder of Tetra Pak
- Spouse: Elisabeth Varenius
- Children: Gad, Hans, and Sven Rausing
- Family: Rausing

Anders Ruben Rausing (Swedish pronunciation: [ˈrʉ̌ːbɛn ˈrâʊsɪŋ]; né Andersson; 17 June 1895 – 10 August 1983) was a Swedish industrialist and the founder of the liquid food packaging company Tetra Pak.

== Early life ==
Anders Ruben Andersson was born in 1895 in Råå, a small fishing hamlet in the district of Raus outside of Helsingborg in the south of Sweden, to August and Mathilda Andersson. His father ran a small but successful business as a master painter. Rausing went to Upper Secondary School in Helsingborg, graduating in 1915. When doing his military service, Rausing, at the time still called (Anders) Ruben Andersson, was allegedly nicknamed rausingen by his fellow servicemen, meaning "the lad from Raus" (referring to his parish of origin). Taking a liking to this name, he eventually changed his surname from Andersson to Rausing. The change took place in 1921.

== Career ==
With the help of a loan from his aunt, Rausing studied at the recently founded Stockholm School of Economics and Business Administration, graduating in 1918. After a brief engagement at the privately owned Stockholms Enskilda Bank, Rausing was employed by Sveriges Litografiska Tryckerier, SLT (later renamed Esselte), a well-known printing company. In 1919, he earned a scholarship from SSE to continue his studies at Columbia University in New York City and obtained an MSc in Economics in 1920. Experiencing self-service grocery stores for the first time during his stay in America, Rausing realised that this system, yet unknown in Europe, was going to be part of a new way of retailing.

Returning to Sweden in 1920, Rausing continued his employment at SLT, first as a Manager Assistant and then as a Manager. During his time at SLT, Rausing became closely acquainted with the industrialist Erik Åkerlund, and in 1929, Rausing left SLT to form a new packaging company together with Åkerlund in Malmö, Åkerlund & Rausing. Åkerlund & Rausing was the first packaging company in Scandinavia and eventually became a leading manufacturer of dry food carton packages. Initially, however, the company had difficulties making profits, and in 1933 Åkerlund sold his share to Rausing, who became the sole owner.

At the time, non-carbonated drinks such as milk and juices were sold in heavy and cumbersome glass bottles, and Rausing was determined to find a way of implementing the new, modern packaging technology, spending a lot of resources on developing new concepts. With the aim of producing a carton container for liquid foods, similar to the hygienic and practical wax-coated paper cartons Rausing had seen overseas, Åkerlund & Rausing created the plastic-coated carton tetrahedron, patented on 27 March 1944.

In 1951, there was still no viable packaging material for the new package, and efforts to develop packaging material increased. Finally, in 1952, the first machine producing tetrahedron cream packages was sold to Lundabygdens Mejeri, a local dairy. The new packaging system was not an immediate success, and the company had difficulties throughout the 1950s, with Rausing continuing to spend large amounts on development. Initially catering primarily to the Swedish market, the company expanded gradually, with Germany (1954), France (1954), and Italy (1956) as its first export markets.

Tetra Pak's commercial breakthrough did not arrive until the mid-60s with the new Tetra Brik package, introduced in 1963, and the development of Aseptic technology. The late 1960s and the 1970s saw a global expansion of the company, much due to the new Tetra Brik Aseptic package, debuted in 1968, which opened up new markets in the developing world and sparked off a virtual explosion in sales. After 30 years, Rausing's venture was successful and Tetra Pak eventually became one of the leading food processing and packaging company in the world.

== Honours ==
Rausing was made Doctor Honoris Causa in Medicine at Lund University in 1957, in Economics at the Stockholm School of Economics and Business Administration in 1959 and in Technology at the Royal Institute of Technology in 1977. He was a member of the Royal Swedish Academy of Engineering Sciences (Ingenjörsvetenskapsakademin, IVA).

== Personal life ==
Ruben Rausing was married to Elisabeth (née Varenius) and had three sons: Gad, Hans, and Sven Rausing.

For tax reasons, Rausing left Sweden for Rome in 1969. All his life, however, he kept his country home Simontorp, near Lund, Sweden, where he died on 10 August 1983 at the age of 88.

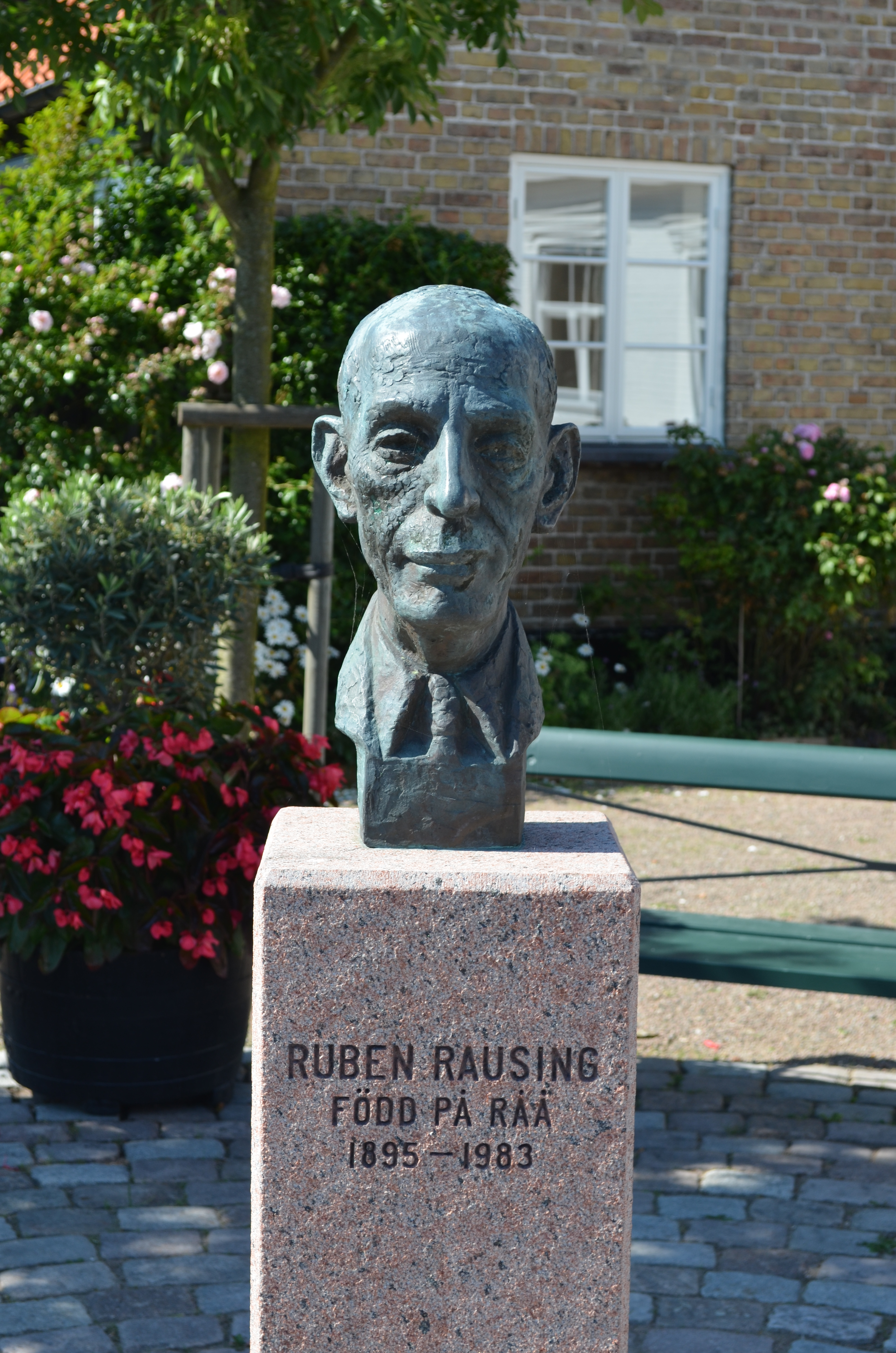
Bust of Rausing at Ruben Rausings torg in Råå, Helsingborg. In 2012.
