= Tetra Pak =

Swedish-Swiss multinational food packaging and processing company

- Type: Private
- Industry: Food packaging
- Founded: 1951; 75 years ago Lund, Sweden, and Pully, Switzerland
- Founder: Ruben Rausing
- Headquarters: Lund, Sweden; Pully, Switzerland
- Area served: Worldwide
- Key people: Adolfo Orive (CEO); Ruben Rausing; Hans Rausing; Gad Rausing
- Revenue: ▲€12.8 billion (2024)
- Number of employees: 24,546 (2024)
- Parent: Tetra Laval
- Website: www.tetrapak.com

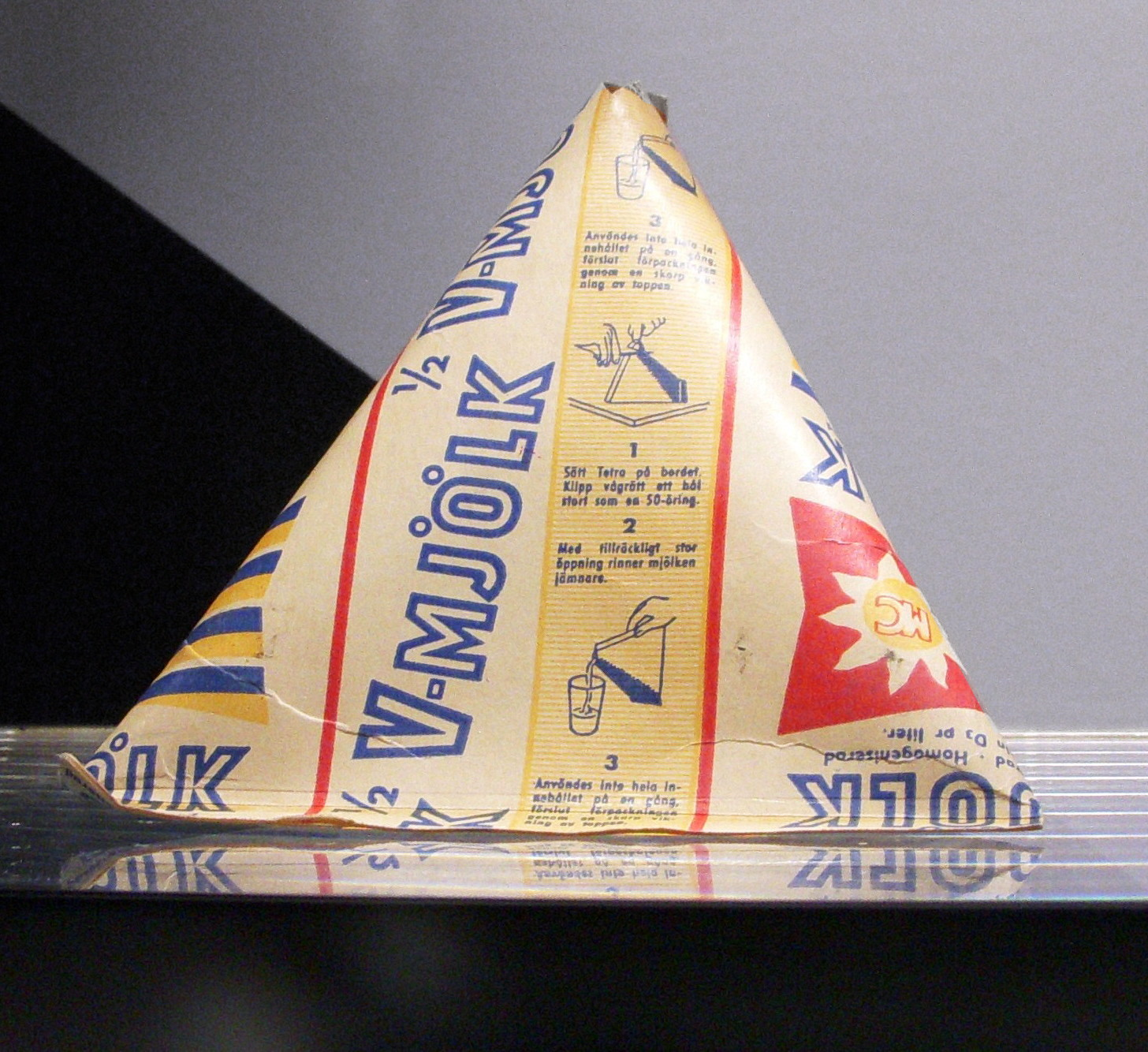
Swedish Tetra Classic milk packaging

Tetra Pak is a Swedish multinational food packaging and processing company headquartered in Switzerland. The company offers packaging, filling machines and processing for dairy, beverages, cheese, ice cream and prepared food, including distribution tools like accumulators, cap applicators, conveyors, crate packers, film wrappers, line controllers and straw applicators.

Tetra Pak was founded by Ruben Rausing and built on Erik Wallenberg's innovation, a tetrahedron-shaped plastic-coated paper carton, from which the company name was derived. In the 1960s and 1970s, the development of the Tetra Brik package and the aseptic packaging technology made supply possible without the need for a cold chain, substantially facilitating distribution and storage. From the beginning of the 1950s to the mid-1990s, the company was headed by Rausing's two sons, Hans and Gad, who took the company from a family business with six employees in 1954 to a multinational corporation, operating in more than 160 countries and with over 25,000 employees as of 2021.

The company is privately owned by the family of Gad Rausing through the Swiss-based holding company Tetra Laval, which also includes the dairy farming equipment producer DeLaval and the PET bottle manufacturer Sidel.

== History ==
=== Åkerlund & Rausing ===
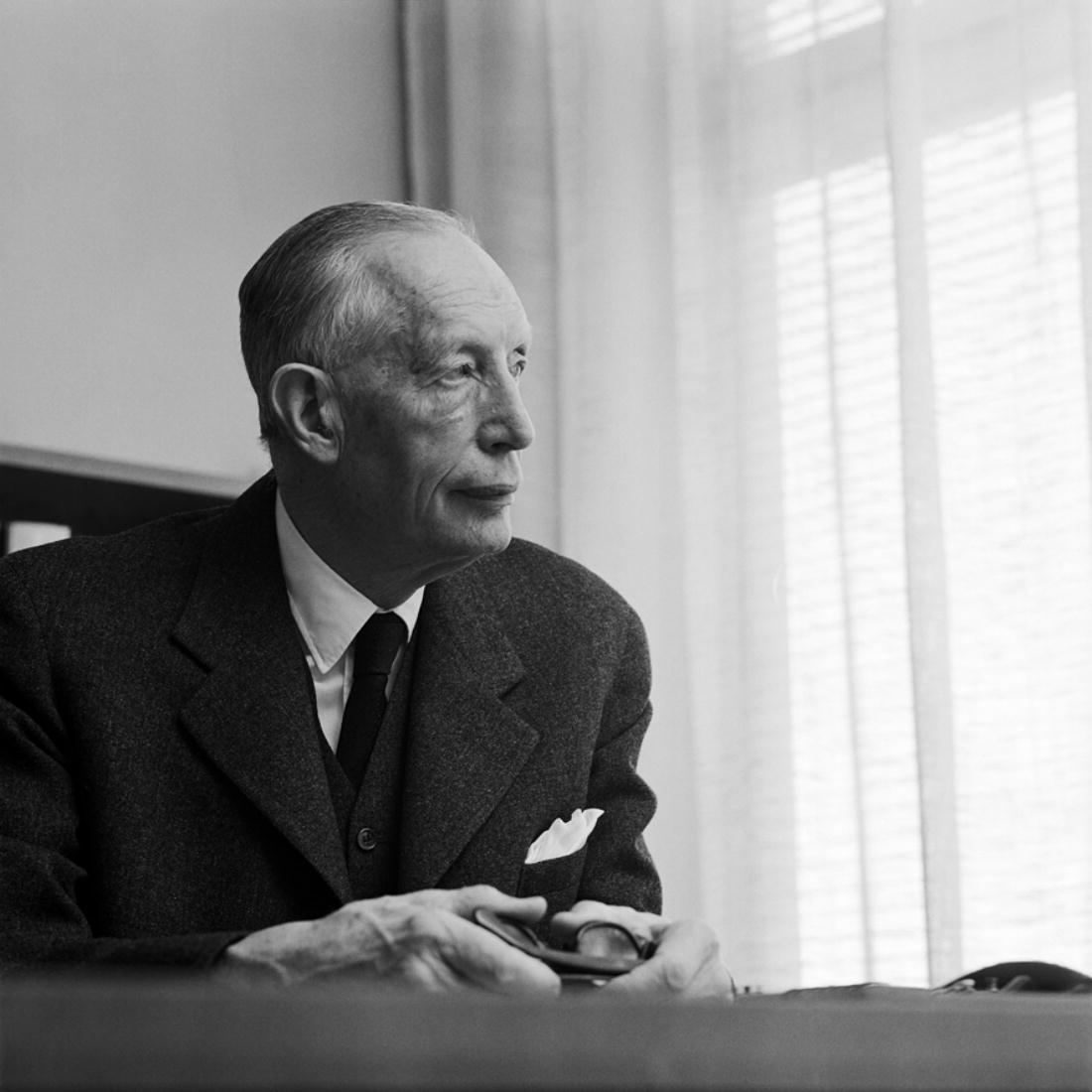
Ruben Rausing

In 1929, Ruben Rausing and Erik Åkerlund established a food carton company in Malmö. Rausing, who had studied in New York at the beginning of the 1920s, had seen self-service grocery stores in the United States, unheard of in Europe at the time, and realised that pre-packaging was part of the future in food retailing as a more hygienic and practical way of distributing staple groceries. At the time, these were sold over the counter in cumbersome glass bottles or impractical paper wraps in most European countries. At the end of the 1920s, Rausing bought a run-down packaging factory in Malmö together with the industrialist Erik Åkerlund. Åkerlund & Rausing was the first packaging company in Scandinavia and eventually became a leading manufacturer of dry food cartons, producing various paper packaging for dry staple groceries.

=== Formation ===
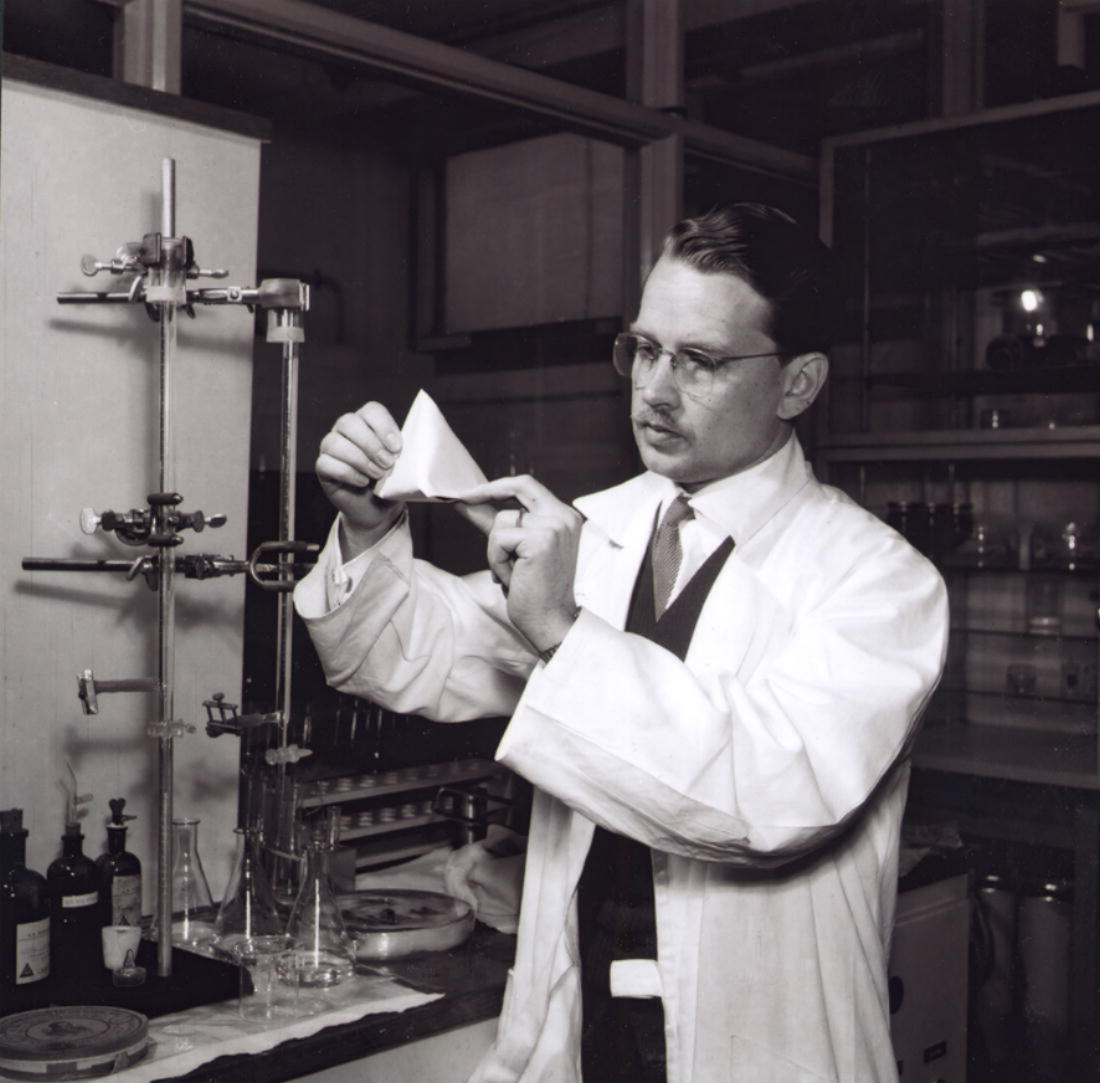
Erik Wallenberg

By the early 1940s, Rausing (now the sole owner of the company) began developing dairy packaging that could compete with loose milk. Erik Wallenberg, an assistant in the Åkerlund & Rausing lab, came up with the idea to construct a tetrahedron-shaped package out of a tube of paper in 1944. On 27 March 1944, Rausing filed a patent for the idea. Rausing's wife Elisabeth reportedly came up with the idea of continuously sealing the packages through the milk while filling the tube in the manner of stuffing sausages. In 1946, the company introduced the first prototype tetrahedron-package filling machine.

=== Operating history ===
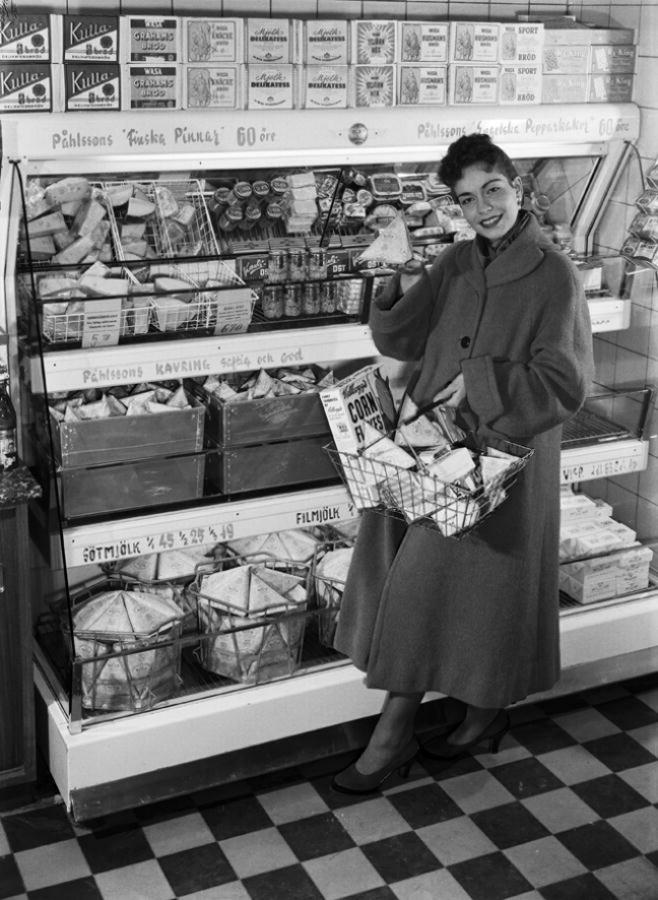
Tetra Classic (1950s)

AB Tetra Pak was established in Lund, Sweden, in 1951 as a subsidiary to Åkerlund & Rausing. In May of that year, the new packaging system was presented to the press, and in 1952, the first filling machine producing 100 ml cream tetrahedrons was delivered to Lundaortens Mejeriförening, a local dairy. In subsequent years, tetrahedron packages became more and more common in Swedish grocery stores, and in 1954, the first machine producing 500 ml milk packages was sold to a Stockholm dairy. That same year, the first machine was exported to Hamburg, Germany, soon to be followed by France (1954), Italy (1956), Switzerland (1957), and later the Soviet Union (1959) and Japan (1962).

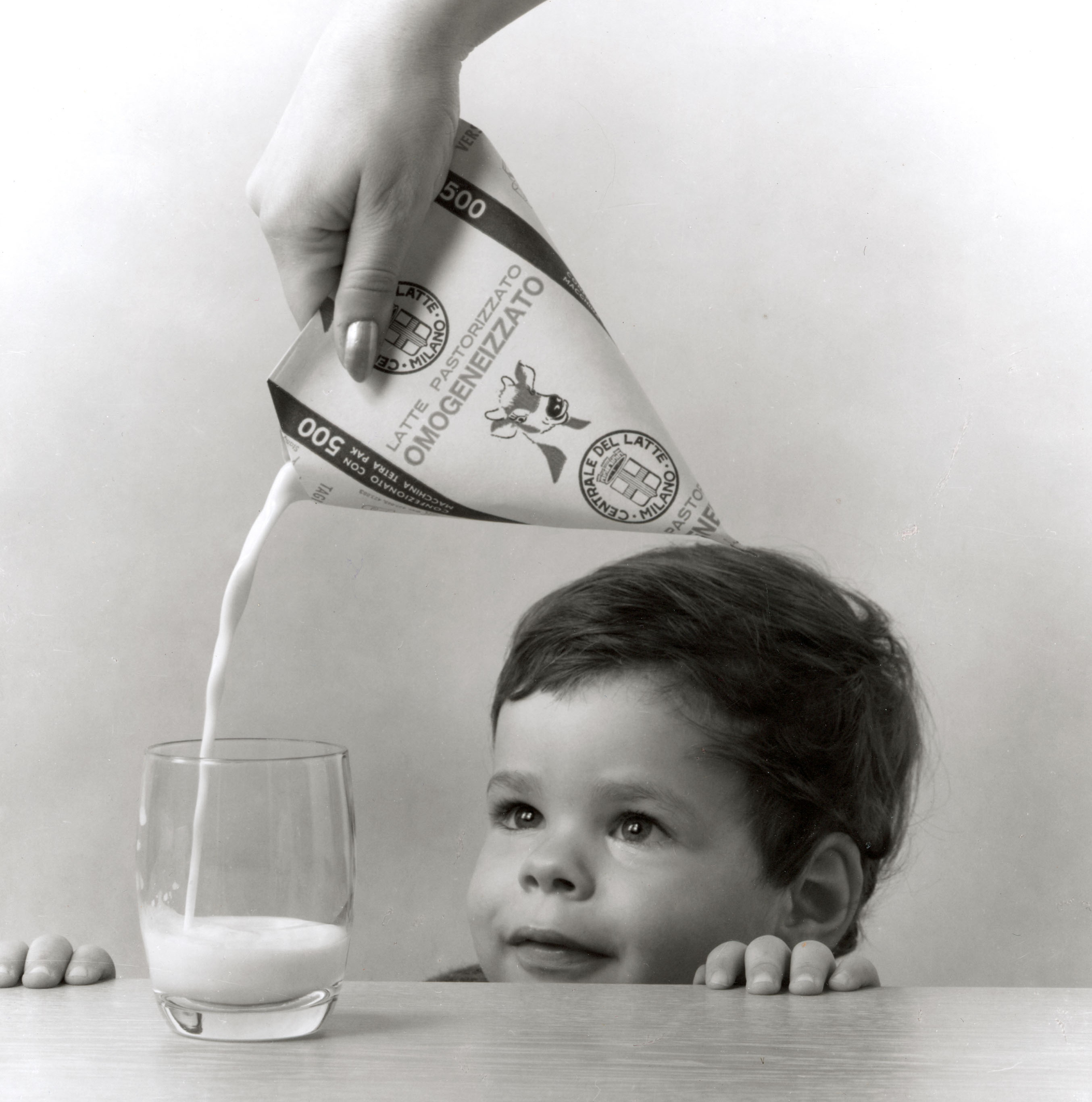
Tetra Classic (1960s)

Rausing strove to improve the Tetra Classic system, beset with many technical problems during the 1950s, and spent enormous amounts on development. The different projects – the tetrahedron, the aseptic packaging technology, Tetra Brik – all demanded large resources, and the company had financial troubles well into the 1960s. Tetra Pak's commercial breakthrough did not arrive until the mid-1960s with the new Tetra Brik package, introduced in 1963, and the development of the aseptic technology. To liberate capital, Åkerlund & Rausing was sold in 1965 while AB Tetra Pak was retained.

International expansion had begun in the 1960s, when the first production plant outside of Sweden was established in Mexico in 1960, soon to be followed by another in the United States in 1962. In 1964, the first Tetra Classic Aseptic machine outside of Europe was installed in Lebanon. The late-1960s and 1970s saw a global expansion of the company, mainly due to the new Tetra Brik Aseptic package, launched in 1969, which opened up new markets in the developing world and sparked an explosion in sales.

=== Mergers and acquisitions ===
In 1981, Tetra Pak relocated its corporate headquarters to Lausanne, Switzerland, for tax reasons, but retained all research in Lund, Sweden. For the equivalent of US$2.5 billion, Tetra Pak acquired Alfa-Laval AB in 1991, a Swedish company producing industrial and agricultural equipment and milk separators, world-leading in its industry, in what was at the time Sweden's largest takeover. Since the deal allowed Tetra Pak to integrate Alfa Laval processing know-how, the merger made it possible for Tetra Pak to offer packaging and processing solutions. The deal drew anti-competitive scrutiny from the European Commission, but it was approved after various concessions from both companies. After the merger with Alfa Laval, Tetra Pak announced plans to return its headquarters to Sweden, and in 1993 Tetra Laval Group was created with dual headquarters in Lund and Lausanne. Alfa Laval's liquid processing unit was absorbed into Tetra Pak and the unit specialising in dairy production machinery was organised separately as Alfa Laval Agri. Alfa Laval Agri was later renamed DeLaval, after Alfa Laval's founder Gustaf de Laval, and is still a part of the Tetra Laval group. The part of Alfa Laval that was not directly linked to Tetra Pak's activities – heat exchangers and separation equipment among others – was sold in 2000 to Swedish finance group Industri Kapital. In 2001, Tetra Laval acquired the French plastic packaging group Sidel. The merger was prohibited by the European Commission on the grounds that both Tetra Pak and Sidel were market leaders in their fields and operated in related business areas. The European Court of Justice eventually ruled in favour for Tetra Laval in a high-profile case. The Tetra Laval Group is controlled by the holding company Tetra Laval International, whose board of directors include the three children of Gad Rausing. In 2014, Tetra Pak acquired Miteco, a provider of production solutions for soft drinks, fruit juices and liquid food, which employs 70 people across sites in Switzerland, Italy, the UK and South America.

== Operations ==
=== Business and markets ===
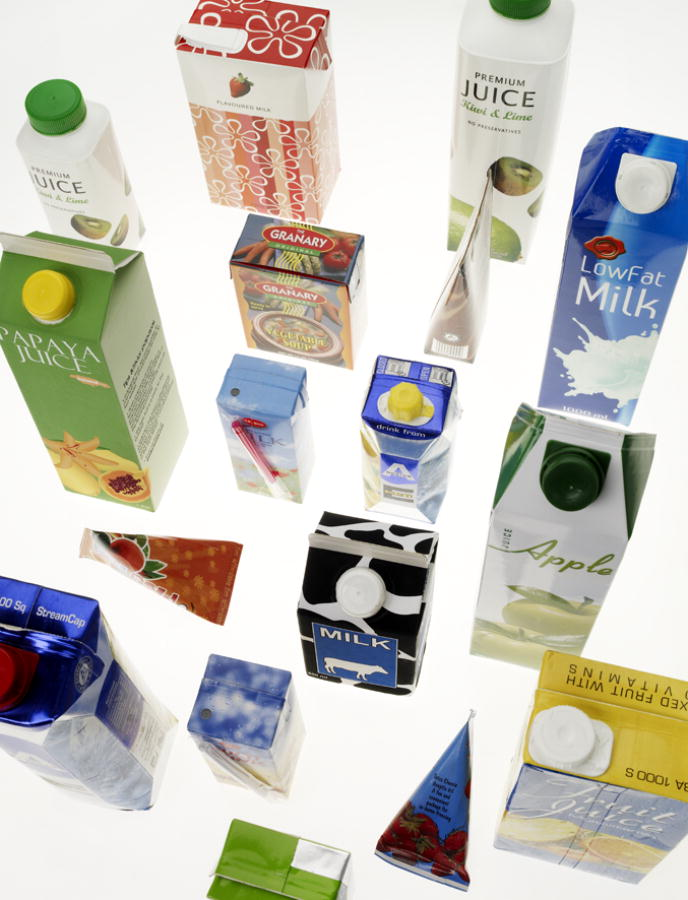
The Tetra Pak packaging portfolio

As of January 2021, Tetra Pak was operating in over 160 countries through its 29 market companies. Between 2007 and 2010, the company saw growth in emerging markets and opened new plants to meet that demand. Tetra Pak invested €100 million to build a plant in Russia in 2007, and built a €60 million plant in China the following year. In 2009, the company announced that it would invest more than €200 million to build plants in India and Pakistan to serve emerging markets in Asia and the Middle East, where milk consumption was rising, especially of ultra-high-temperature processed milk. At the time, two-thirds of Tetra Pak's global sales came from dairy packaging.

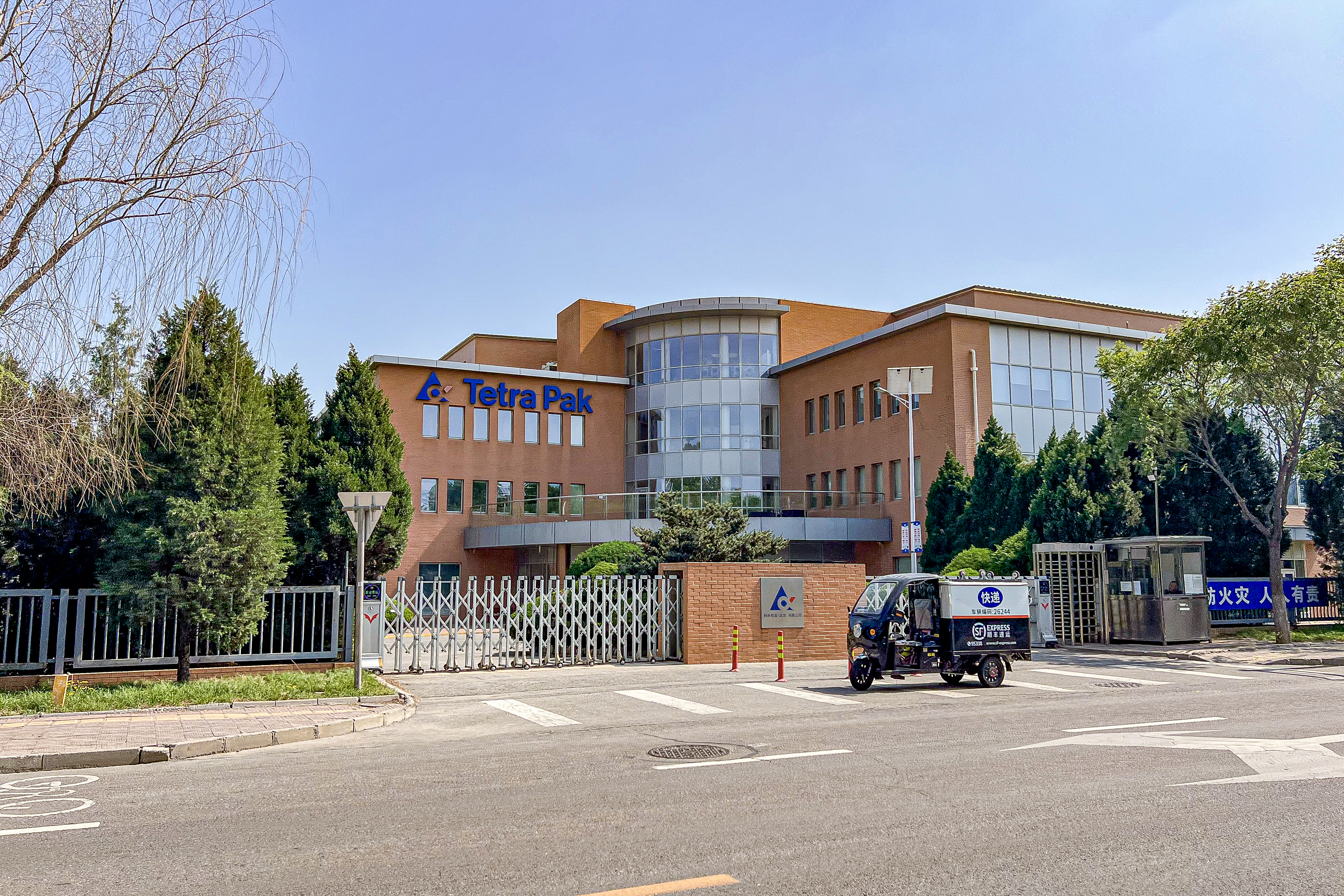
Tetra Pak (Beijing) Corporation Limited in Majuqiao Town, Beijing, China

In 2010, Tetra Pak reported a 5.2 percent increase in sales, with an annual turnover of approximately €10 billion. Growth in Asian, Eastern European, and South American markets helped drive the increase. The company opened a €120 million aseptic packaging plant in Vietnam in 2019 to supply countries in the Association of Southeast Asian Nations, Australia, and New Zealand. According to the company, it had total sales of €11.5 billion in 2019. Tetra Pak's most popular product is the Tetra Brik Aseptic, a best-seller since the 1970s.

=== Competition ===
In an interview in Swedish business monthly Affärsvärlden in 2006, then Tetra Pak CEO Dennis Jönsson stated that Tetra Pak's main competitor was Swiss manufacturer SIG Combibloc, adding that Tetra Pak's main competition generally no longer comes from companies producing similar packaging but from industries and companies producing other types of packaging with a lower cost of production, like the PET bottle. Jönsson perceived the PET bottle as Tetra Pak's biggest threat in the European market at the time. The Norwegian company Elopak/Pure-Pak produces similar style carton packages and has historically been Tetra Pak's principal competitor. The Chinese packaging company Greatview has begun challenging Tetra Pak, both in the Chinese market and in Europe.

== Products ==
=== Aseptic technology ===
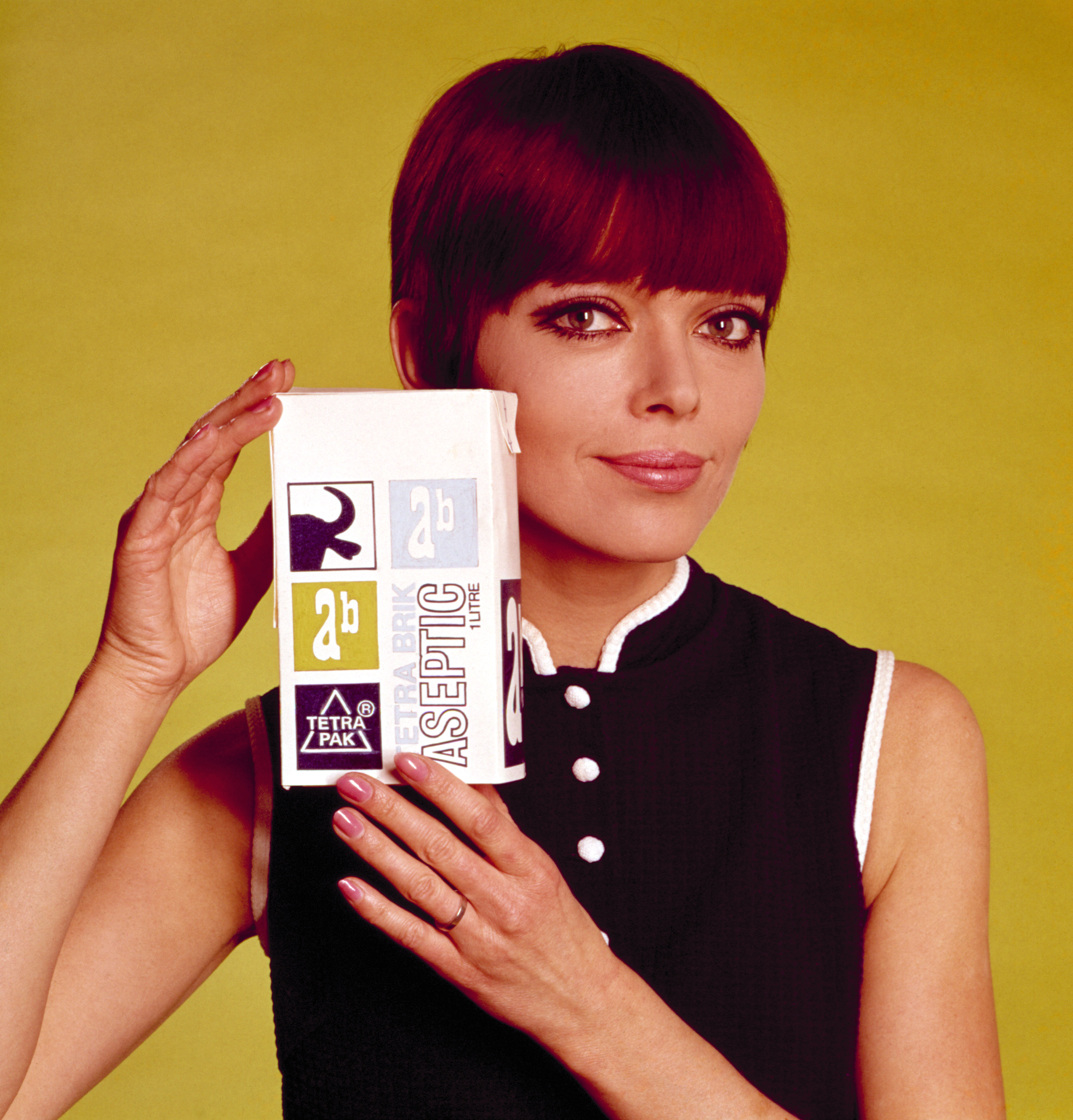
Aseptic technology: Tetra Brik Aseptic, 1960s

Tetra Pak uses aseptic packaging technology. In aseptic processing, the product and the package are sterilized separately and then combined and sealed in a sterile atmosphere, in contrast to canning, where product and package are first combined and then sterilized. When filled with ultra-heat treated (UHT) foodstuffs (liquids like milk and juice or processed food like vegetables and preserved fruits), the aseptic packages can be preserved without being chilled for up to one year, with the result that distribution and storage costs, as well as environmental impact, is greatly reduced and product shelf life expanded.

The aseptic packaging technology has been called the most important food packaging innovation of the 20th century by the Institute of Food Technologists.

=== Packages ===
- Tetra Classic is the name of the first, tetrahedral package, launched by Tetra Pak in 1952, with an aseptic version released in 1961 and still in use, mainly for portion-sized cream packages and children's juices.
- The Tetra Brik, a package in the shape of a rectangular cuboid, was launched in 1963 after a long and costly development process. An aseptic version, Tetra Brik Aseptic was launched in 1969. In terms of entities sold, it is the most popular of the Tetra Pak packages.
- The pillow-shaped Tetra Fino Aseptic was introduced in 1997, aiming to provide low cost and simplicity.
- Tetra Gemina Aseptic was introduced in 2007 as the "world’s first roll-fed gable top package with full aseptic performance".
- The Tetra Prisma Aseptic was launched in 1996. It has an octagonal shape with the aim of providing a more ergonomic experience.
- The Tetra Rex is a cuboid shaped package with a gable-top. It was launched in Sweden in 1966.
- Tetra Recart was launched in 2003 and is a package shaped as a rectangular cuboid that is meant to provide an alternative to previously canned foodstuffs such as vegetables, fruit and pet food.
- Tetra Top was launched in 1986 as a re-closable, rounded cuboid package with a plastic upper part, including opening and closure elements. The lid, molded in polyethylene in a single mold, makes it easy to open and reclose.
- Tetra Wedge Aseptic was developed to keep packaging material to a minimum while retaining a square surface underneath. It was introduced in 1997.
- The Tetra Evero Aseptic is the latest of the Tetra Pak packages, launched in 2011 and marketed as the world's first aseptic carton bottle for ambient milk.

In November 2011, the Tetra Brik carton package was represented at the exhibition Hidden Heroes – The Genius of Everyday Things at the London Science Museum/Vitra Design Museum, celebrating "the miniature marvels we couldn’t live without". The Royal Swedish Academy of Engineering Sciences called the Tetra Pak packaging system one of Sweden's most successful inventions of all time.

==== Openings ====
- The LightWing 30, first tested in production in 2022, is a one-step tethered resealable cap based on a flip opening mechanism, which meets the Single-Use Plastics EU Directive.

=== Processing and distribution ===
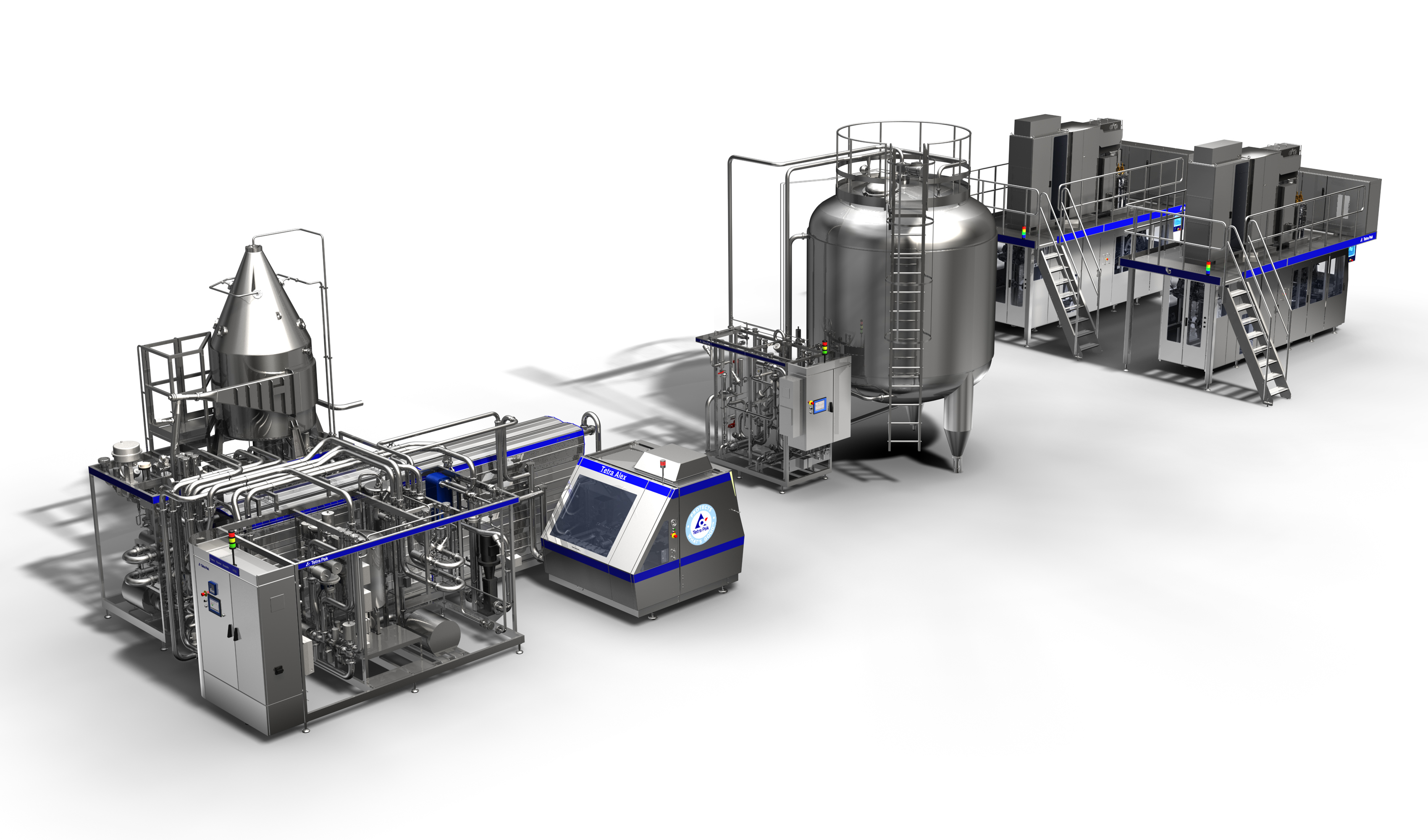
Tetra Pak processing equipment Tetra Lactenso Aseptic

While the original idea was to provide hygienic pre-packaging for liquid foodstuffs, Tetra Pak is now providing a range of different packaging and processing products and services due to its acquisition of Alfa Laval in 1991, consequently supplying complete systems of processing, packaging, and distribution within fields as various as ice cream, cheese, fruit, vegetables and pet food.

In addition to its various packaging products, Tetra Pak thus provides integrated processing and distribution lines for different kinds of food manufacturing, including packaging machines and carton paper, equally providing distribution equipment like conveyors, tray packers, film wrappers, crates, straws, and roll containers. The company offers automated production equipment and technical service.

== Environment ==
=== Environmental policy ===
Tetra Pak products have been identified as a solid waste problem by many NGOs and environmental groups. Unlike aluminum cans or glass bottles, it cannot be recycled in municipal recycling facilities. In order to stave off regulation, the company has engineered a strong Corporate Social Responsibility campaign. In 2011, Tetra Pak published a set of sustainability targets, which included maintaining its CO_{2} emission levels at the same level until 2020 and increasing recycling by 100 percent. Previous Tetra Pak sustainability targets (2005–2010) were met and exceeded. Maintaining current CO_{2} emission levels until 2020 would result in a 40 percent relative cut in emissions at an average growth rate of five percent per year, according to Food Production Daily. Tetra Pak said it will increase its use of Forest Stewardship Council (FSC) certified paper to 100 percent in 2020, with an interim target of 50 percent by 2012. The new targets will encompass the whole value chain, from suppliers to customers, putting pressure on partners to perform coherently.

As of 2017, Tetra Pak was a Carbon Disclosure Project "A-lister" and 100% of its paperboard that year was either FSC-certified or came from other controlled sources that exclude "five environmentally and socially unacceptable categories as defined by the FSC." The company began producing paper straws for some of its smaller containers in 2019.

In 2020, Tetra Pak joined the European Alliance for a Green Recovery, and set new goals to achieve net zero operations emissions by 2030, and net zero value chain emissions by 2050."

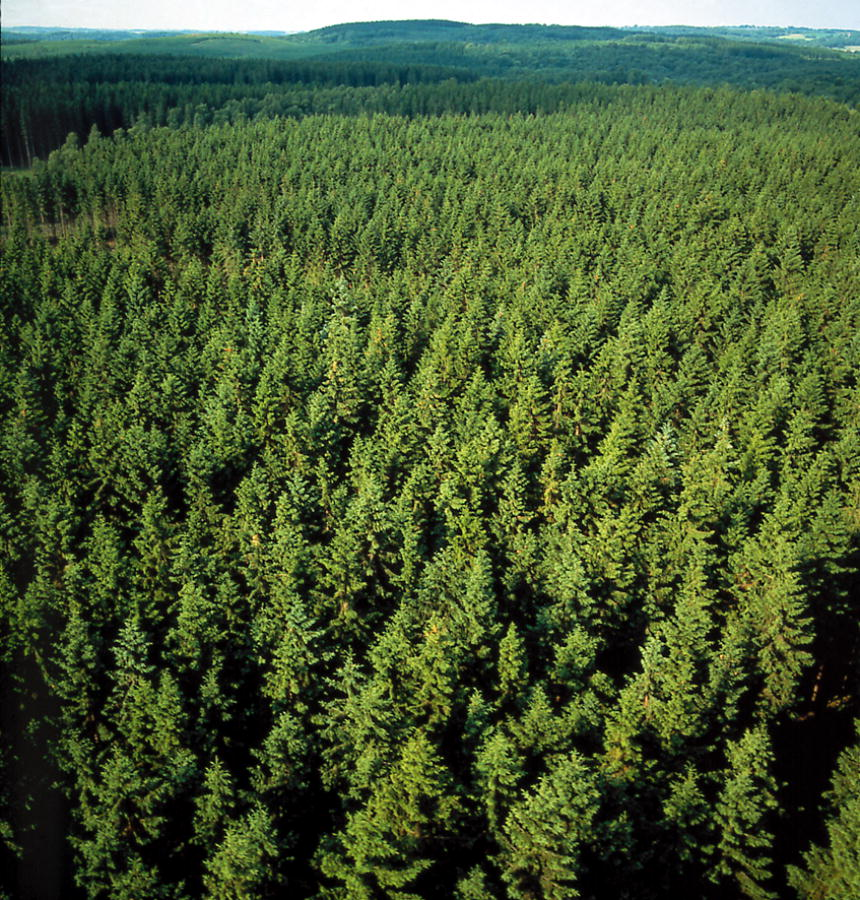
Carton raw material: Swedish pine forest

The company reported that it secures raw material for paper cartons in cooperation with the World Wide Fund for Nature (WWF), the Global Forest and Trade Network (GFTN), and FSC, and that it strives to source polyethylene made from sugarcane from sustainable suppliers in Brazil. In 2010, 40 percent of Tetra Pak's carton supply was FSC-certified. Slowly, sectors where glass bottles have been paramount, like the wine and spirits industry, have begun to look at carton containers as a possible packaging product as the carbon footprint of a carton container is said to be about one-tenth of that of an equivalent glass bottle.

Tetra Pak's sustainability work has gained recognition from industry and retailers alike. In 2010, it received the Swedish Forest Industries Climate Award for assuming global responsibility for the forests that provide its raw material. The recently introduced Tetra Recart has also been hailed by large retail groups like Sainsbury's as "the 21st Century alternative to canned foods" as the carton's rectangular shape makes transportation, storage, and distribution more efficient, taking up 21 percent less space and weighing two-thirds of a tin can of equivalent volume.

=== Recycling ===
The key components of a TBA (Tetra Brik Aseptic) package

Since aseptic packages contain different layers of plastic and aluminium in addition to raw paper, they cannot be recycled as "normal" paper waste, but need to go to special recycling units for separation of the different materials. As a result, Tetra Pak cannot be put in recycling or compost bins. Recycled Tetra Paks may be used in producing polythene-based products and construction material, the third largest contributor to carbon footprint. Tetra Pak has operated limited recycling since the mid-1980s, introducing a recycling program for its containers in Canada as early as 1990. In 2000, Tetra Pak invested 20 million baht (€500,000) in the first recycling plant for aseptic packages in Thailand. Recycling aseptic packages has been one of Tetra Pak's challenges. Once separated, the aseptic carton yields aluminum and pure paraffin, which can be used in industry. Even without separating the carton materials, however, the aseptic carton can be reused, for example, in engineering equipment. In 2010, 30 billion used Tetra Pak cartons were recycled, doubling since 2002. The company aims to double the recycling rate within the next ten years, something that will require the engagement of the entire recycling chain. As of 2011, 20 percent of Tetra Pak cartons are recycled globally, with countries like Belgium, Germany, Spain, and Norway showing local recycling rates of over 50 percent. To increase the level of recycling and meet its targets, Tetra Pak engaged in driving recycling activities such as developing collection schemes, launching new recycling technologies, and raising awareness of recycling and sustainability. Used Tetra Pak packages have been recycled as construction material in design projects, with varying results.

By 2017, 25% of Tetra Pak cartons were recycled globally. At that time, the company announced that global recycling rates would no longer be one of its main metrics measured in sustainability reports, abandoning its previous target of increasing recycling rates to 40% by 2020, and instead introduced new metrics to measure against, such as public outreach, access to recycling facilities, and recycling capacity. In 2018, Tetra Pak signed an agreement with the environmental services company Veolia "to recycle all the components of used beverage cartons collected within the EU by 2025." Tetra Pak has also partnered with the Certified Renovated Equipment organization to refurbish old equipment so it can be resold as part of a circular economy initiative.

In attempts to innovate and to improve the recyclability rate of their Aseptic cartons, one of the main factors is the replacement of the aluminum layer used, which can constitute up to 5% of the package material. In which, exposure to the metal has been suggested as a risk factor for Alzheimer's Disease. The company is currently testing two alternatives as a replacement for aluminum: (1) a fiber-based barrier layer, and (2) a polymer-based barrier. In Which the company has already done successful commercial consumer testing in 2022 of an alternative from the aluminum layer with a paper-based barrier that increases its recyclability up to 90% and in effect reduces its carbon footprint by one third (33%).

== Community projects ==
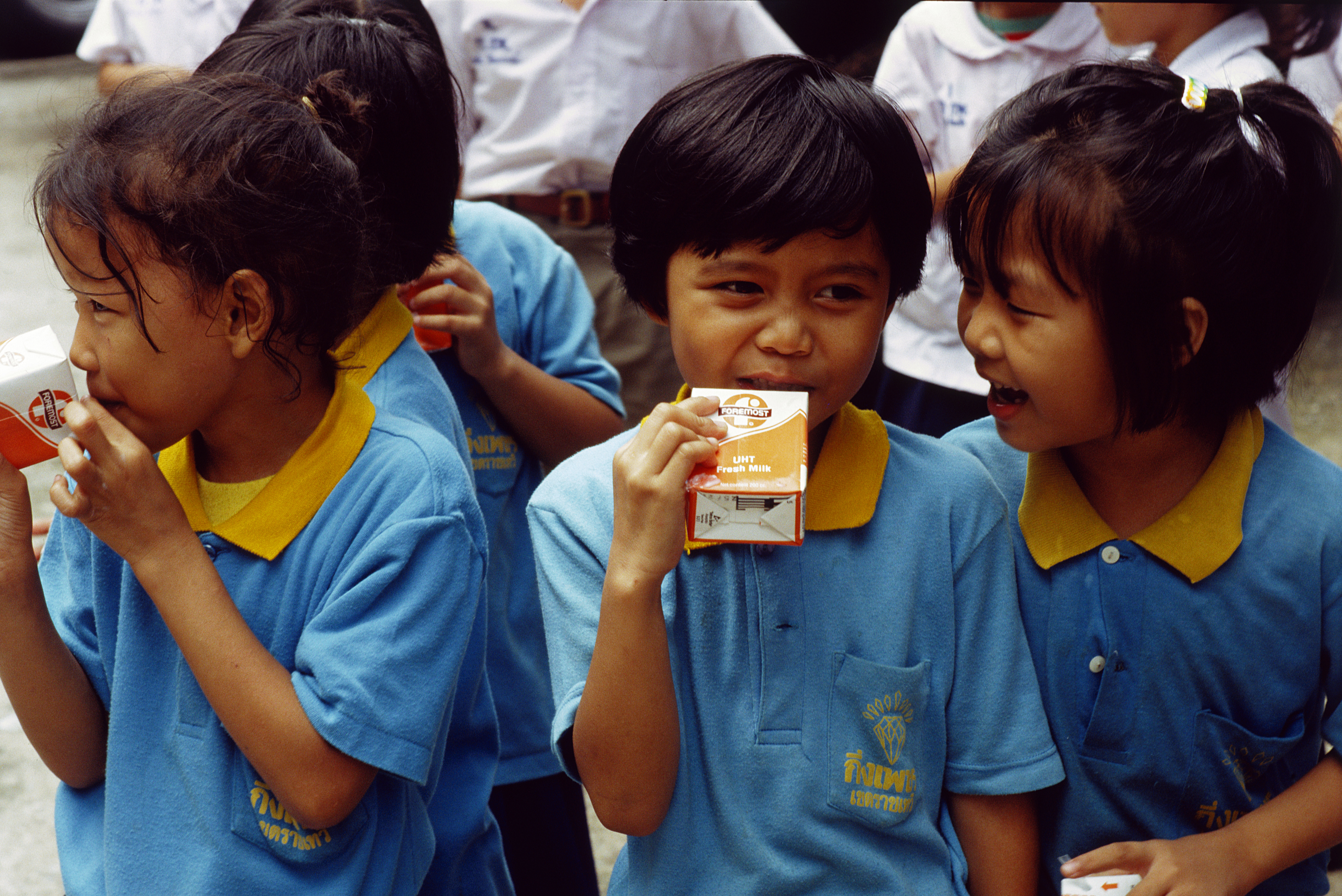
School milk in Thailand

In the late-1970s, Ruben Rausing worked on Operation Flood, a joint venture between the World Food Programme, the World Bank, and Tetra Pak to supply Western milk surplus to Indian households. The company established its Food for Development office in 2000, through which it works with local governments, NGOs and farmers to develop school milk programmes, a cause it has supported since 1962, when the first school milk programme supported by Tetra Pak launched in Mexico.

After the 2008 Chinese melamine scandal, the Chinese government tightened regulations on safety and environmental standards, damaging the country's market for packaged milk and infant formula. Tetra Pak had nothing to do with the scandal; however, Tetra Pak China established a training program that was delivered by a food safety school, DVDs, and books, resulting in over 30 farms meeting EU quality standards, according to Tetra Pak China. The effort also included a push to reduce waste by advising customers on recycling and working alongside the World Wildlife Fund to reduce carbon dioxide emissions. The Financial Times indicated this was not a philanthropic act, but a way to establish a future for the company by ensuring there was always a market for their products. In 2015, Tetra Pak in collaboration with DeLavel, signed a five-year agreement with the Dairy Association of China to provide training to 150 Chinese dairy farm managers, providing them with the skills required to run larger-scale dairy farms. It is unclear if this initiative was voluntary or paid for. Tetra Pak also works with Chinese schools to regulate storage, distribution and recycling of school milk. They certified 53 schools as 'Promotion Model Schools' in 2017 and aimed to certify 50 more schools in 2018.

During the COVID-19 pandemic, Tetra Pak helped maintain the delivery of school feeding programmes via online orders and non-contact delivery methods. The Tetra Laval Group donates 10 million Euro to various voluntary organisations supporting health care systems.

Following the 2022 Russian invasion of Ukraine, Tetra Pak condemned the invasion and Tetra Laval donated 10 million Euro towards organisations including UNICEF, Save The Children, The Red Cross and Doctors Without Borders.

== Controversy ==
=== Market Share ===
Tetra Pak has occasionally been subject to controversy, most notably regarding its near-monopoly position on certain markets for many years. Especially attempts at mergers have been subject to scrutiny. Its merger with French PET-production company Sidel in 2001 drew anti-competition allegations from the European Commission. The court case was drawn out for many years and twice appealed to the European Court of First Instance before the European Court of Justice ruled in favour of Tetra Laval. In 2004, Tetra Pak was accused of using its near-monopoly in China, where it owned 95 percent of the market for aseptic carton packaging. The allegations were contested by Tetra Pak.

=== Parmalat scandal ===
In January 2004, Italian dairy giant Parmalat was caught in a multibillion-euro accounting scandal, culminating in the arrest of the owner Calisto Tanzi. Parmalat CFO Fausto Tonna told the Italian business daily Il Sole 24 Ore that Tetra Pak had made substantial payments to Tanzi and his family and to a company in the Cayman Islands belonging to Parmalat. Tetra Pak acknowledged having made payments to Parmalat but stated that the payments had been made as discounts to subsidize marketing operations and pricing, as is usual practice with large customers. Tetra Pak was asked by Italian authorities to provide documentation on the transactions, and found that payments had been made since 1995 as part of regular operations but that no payments had been made specifically to the Tanzi family. Calisto Tanzi was eventually sentenced to eight years imprisonment for fraud by the Italian high court in Milan after several appeals in lower courts.

=== Tetrahedron legacy ===
When visiting the Tetra Pak factory in Lund in the 1950s, Danish physics professor and Nobel Prize laureate Niels Bohr allegedly claimed to "never have seen such an adequate practical application of a mathematical problem" as the tetrahedron package and the innovation of the milk tetrahedron. The question of who invented it has been the subject of some disagreements. Erik Wallenberg did not receive any formal recognition until 1991, when he was awarded the Royal Swedish Academy of Engineering Sciences' Great Gold Medal for outstanding achievement for the invention.
