= Punching =

Creating a hole by forcing a tool through the workpiece

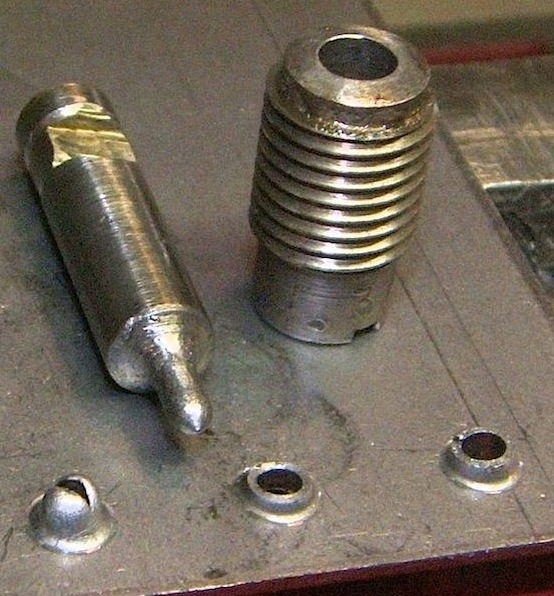
Extruded holes with the punch and die used to create them. No pilot hole was used on the left.

Punching is a forming process that uses a punch press to force a tool, called a punch, through the workpiece to create a hole via shearing. Punching is applicable to a wide variety of materials that come in sheet form, including sheet metal, paper, vulcanized fibre and some forms of plastic sheet. The punch often passes through the work into a die. A scrap slug from the hole is deposited into the die in the process. Depending on the material being punched this slug may be recycled and reused or discarded.

Punching is often the cheapest method for creating holes in sheet materials in medium to high production volumes. When a specially shaped punch is used to create multiple usable parts from a sheet of material (i.e. the punched-out piece is the good piece), the process is known as blanking. In metal forging applications the work is often punched while hot, and this is called hot punching. Slugging is a type of metal-punching operation in which the action of the punch is stopped as soon as metal fracture is complete; the punched piece is not removed but is left in the hole.

== Process ==
Punch tooling (punch and die) is often made of hardened steel or tungsten carbide. A die is located on the opposite side of the workpiece and supports the material around the perimeter of the hole and helps to localize the shearing forces for a cleaner edge. There is a small amount of clearance between the punch and the die to prevent the punch from sticking in the die and so less force is needed to make the hole. The amount of clearance needed depends on the thickness, with thicker materials requiring more clearance, but the clearance is always less than the thickness of the workpiece. The clearance is also dependent on the hardness of the workpiece. The punch press forces the punch through a workpiece, producing a hole that has a diameter equivalent to the punch, or slightly smaller after the punch is removed. All ductile materials stretch to some extent during punching which often causes the punch to stick in the workpiece. In this case, the punch must be physically pulled back out of the hole while the work is supported from the punch side, and this process is known as stripping. The hole walls will show burnished area, rollover, and die break and must often be further processed. The slug from the hole falls through the die into some sort of container to either dispose of the slug or recycle it.

== Punching characteristics ==
The characteristics of punching are:

- It is the most cost effective process of making holes in strip or sheet metal for average to high fabrication.
- It is able to create multiple shaped holes.
- Punches and dies are usually fabricated from conventional tool steel or carbides
- It creates a burnished region roll-over, and die break on sidewall of the resulting hole.
- It is a quick process.

== Geometry ==
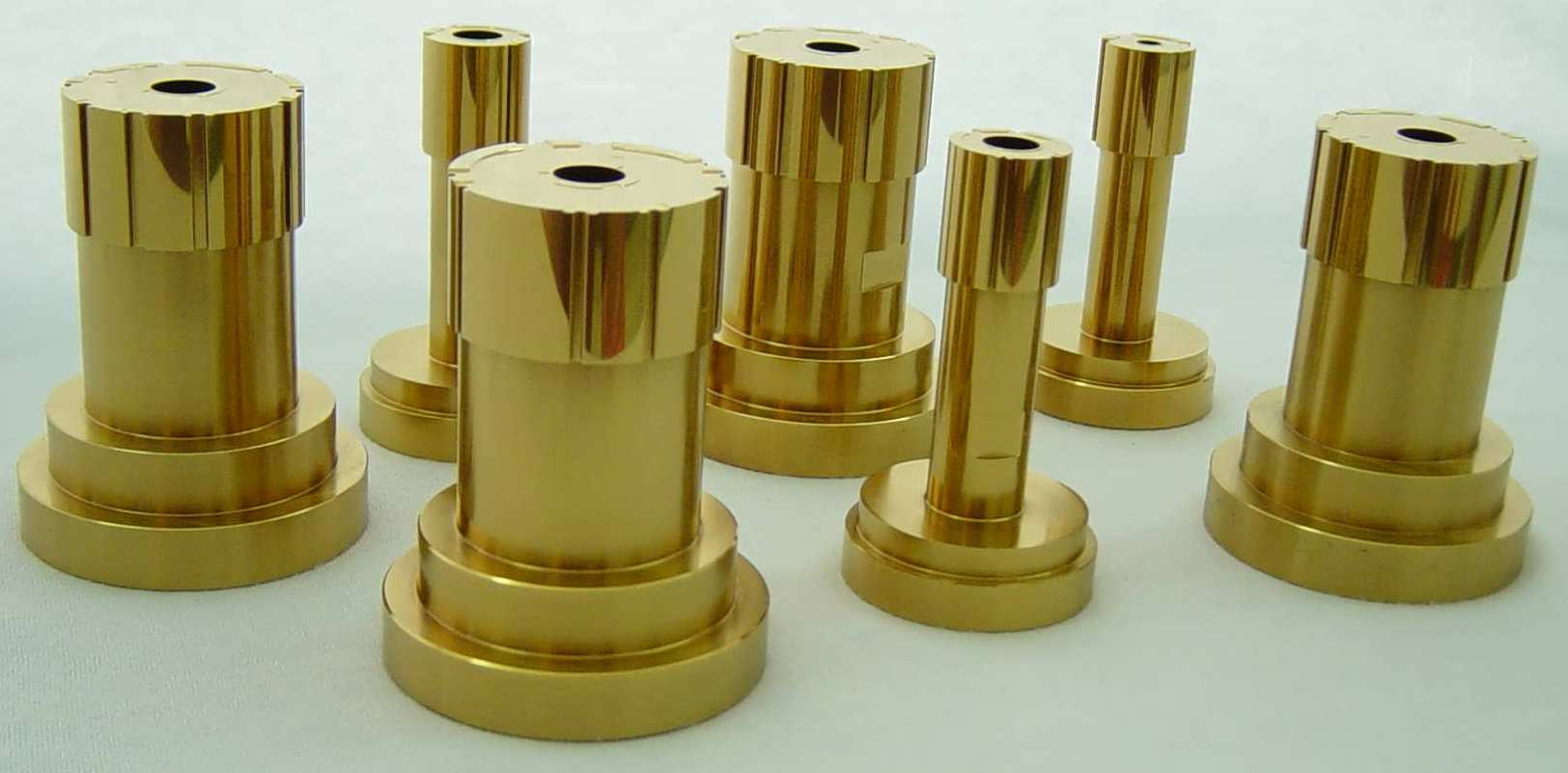
Titanium nitride (TiN) coated industrial punches using cathodic arc deposition technique

The workpiece is often in the form of a sheet or roll. Materials for the workpiece can vary, commonly being metals and plastics. The punch and die themselves can have a variety of shapes to create an array of different shaped holes in the workpiece. Multiple punches may be used together to create a part in one step.

Usually, the punch and die are close to the same dimensions, creating a sheared edge when they meet. A punch that is significantly smaller than the die can be used to produce an extruded hole where the punch displaces the punched material to the sides, forming a tube perpendicular to the punched sheet.

== Equipment ==
Most punch presses are mechanically operated, but simple punches are often hand-powered. Major components of this mechanical press are the frame, motor, ram, die posts, bolster, and bed. The punch is mounted into the ram, and the die is mounted to the bolster plate. The scrap material drops through as the workpiece is advanced for the next hole. Most common in industry are large computer-controlled punch press, called a CNC. These most commonly are of the 'turret' or 'rail' variety. A turret punch press houses punches and their corresponding dies in a revolving indexed turret, while a rail type punch stores tooling on a back rail out of the way of the workpiece. These machines use hydraulic as well as pneumatic power to press the shape with enough force to shear the metal.

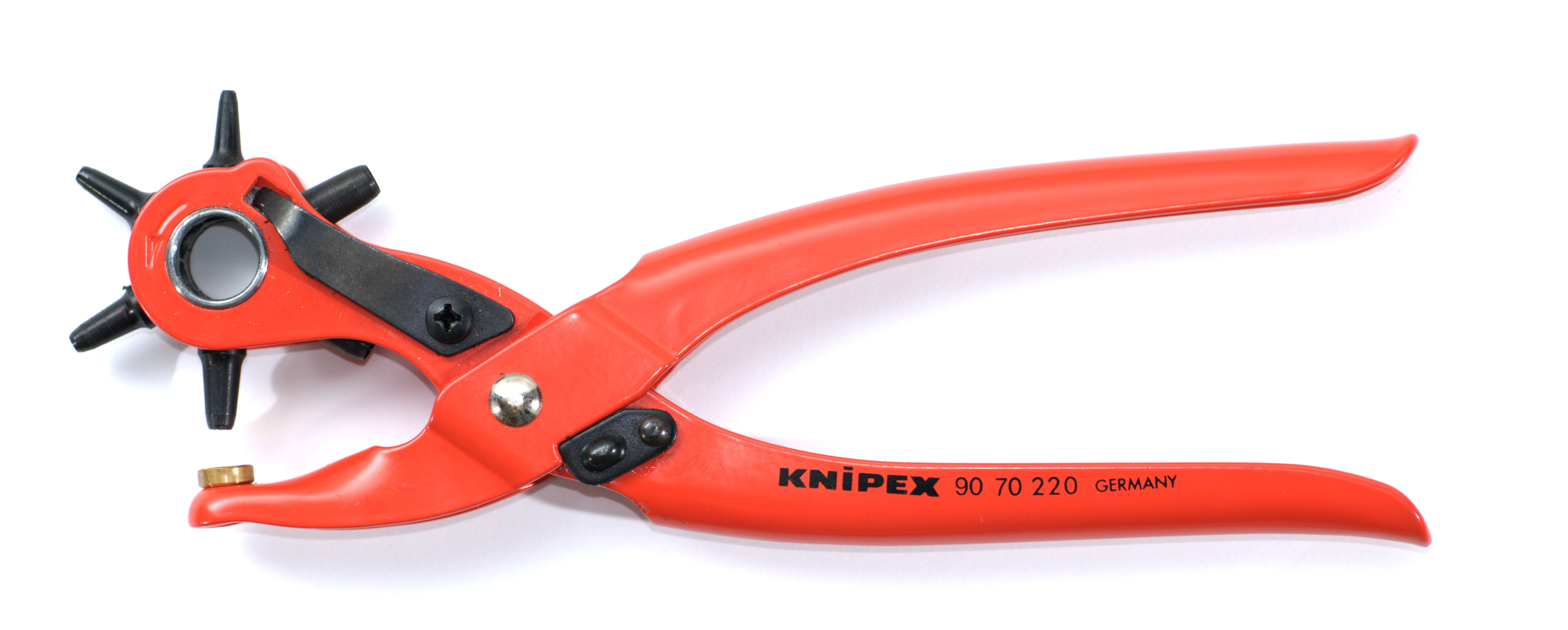
Single-hole punch for leather, cloth, or thin plastic

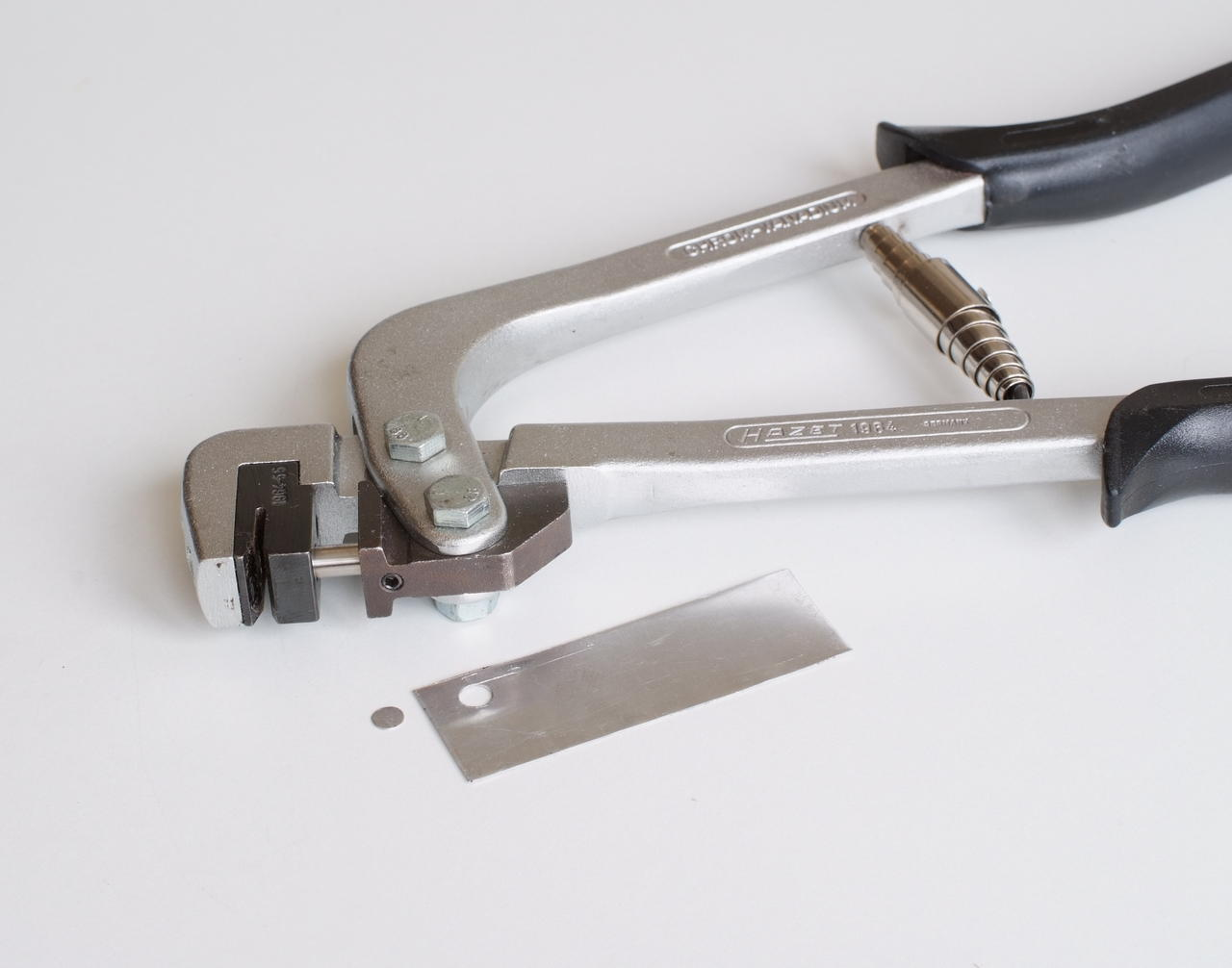
Single-hole punch for sheet metal

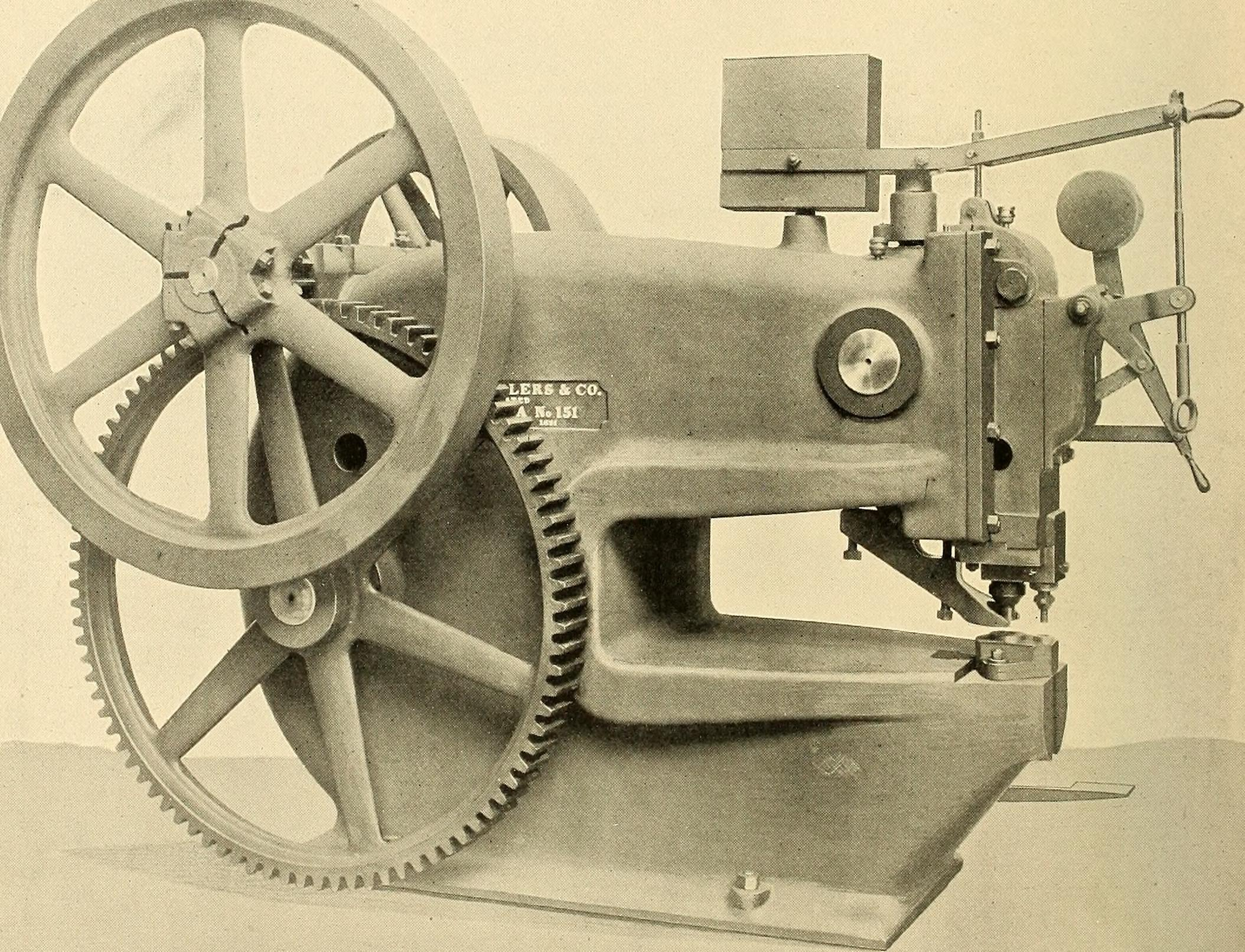
Industrial punch for metalworking

== Forces ==
The punch force required to punch a piece of sheet metal can be estimated from the following equation:

$$F = 0.7tL(UTS)$$

Where t is the sheet metal thickness, L is the total length sheared (perimeter of the shape), and UTS is the ultimate tensile strength of the material.

Die and punch shapes affect the force during the punching process. The punch force increases during the process as the entire thickness of the material is sheared at once. A beveled punch helps in the shearing of thicker materials by reducing the force at the beginning of the stroke. However, beveling a punch will distort the shape because of lateral forces that develop. Compound dies allow multiple shaping to occur. Using compound dies will generally slow down the process and are typically more expensive than other dies. Progressive dies may be used in high production operations. Different punching operations and dies may be used at different stages of the operation on the same machine.

== Related processes ==
Other processes such as stamping, blanking, perforating, parting, drawing, notching, lancing and bending operations are all related to punching.

== Plastics ==
Punching in plastics fabrication usually refers to the removal of scrap plastic from the desired article. For example, in extrusion blow molding it is common to use punching dies to remove tails, molding flash (scrap plastic) and handle slugs from bottles or other molded containers.

In shuttle machinery, the containers are usually trimmed in the machines, and finished containers leave the blow molding machine. Other blow molding equipment, such as rotary wheel machinery, requires the use of downstream trimming. Types of downstream trimming equipment include detabbers for tail removal, rotary or reciprocating punch trimmers, and spin trimmers.

== See also ==
- Knockout punch
