= Krones =

Company

Krones AG
- Company type: Aktiengesellschaft
- Traded as: FWB: KRN; MDAX
- Industry: Manufacturing, systems engineering
- Founded: 1951; 75 years ago
- Founder: Herman Kronseder
- Headquarters: Neutraubling, Germany
- Key people: Christoph Klenk (CEO and chairman of the executive board), Volker Kronseder (Chairman of the supervisory board)
- Products: Machinery and production lines for bottling, canning and other packaging
- Revenue: €5.29 billion
- Number of employees: 20,379 (2014)
- Website: www.krones.com

Krones AG is a German packaging and bottling machine manufacturer. It produces lines for filling beverages in plastic and glass bottles or beverage cans. The company manufactures stretch blow-moulding machines for producing polyethylene terephthalate (PET) bottles, plus fillers, labellers, bottle washers, pasteurisers, inspectors, packers and palletisers. This product portfolio is complemented by material flow systems and process technology for producing beverages for breweries, dairies and soft-drink companies.

== History ==
Krones' corporate evolution is closely connected to the socioeconomic conditions prevalent in Germany following World War II. Hermann Kronseder, the father of the present-day chairman of the supervisory board, used his own designs to manufacture semi-automatic labellers starting with 1951. In the further development as from the 1960s, the firm's range of machinery was extended to include packers and filling systems. In 1980, the company was converted into a stock corporation as Krones AG. With acquisitions of other companies the present-day range of machines for the beverage industry was reached:

- 1983: Anton Steinecker Maschinenfabrik (brewhouse manufacture), Freising, Germany
- 1988: Zierk Maschinenbau GmbH (bottle washers), Flensburg, Germany
- 1998: Max Kettner GmbH (packaging machines), Rosenheim, Germany
- 2000: Sander Hansen A/S (pasteurising systems), Brøndby, Denmark
- 2015: Gernep Group (labellers), Barbing, Germany
- 2016: System Logistics S.p.A. (60% of shares), Fiorano Modenese, Italy

== Corporate data ==
The headquarters of the group is situated in Neutraubling near Regensburg, Germany. In Germany in total 11,312 people are employed. Machines and systems are manufactured at the German production facilities (Neutraubling, Nittenau, Flensburg, Freising and Rosenheim). From 2019 on a fabrication site in Debrecen, Hungary, completes production facilities. The internationally focused company achieves more than 90% of its total turnover abroad and is represented worldwide through around 90 subsidiaries and shareholdings. The intralogistics business of Krones is handled by Syskron Holding GmbH since 2014.

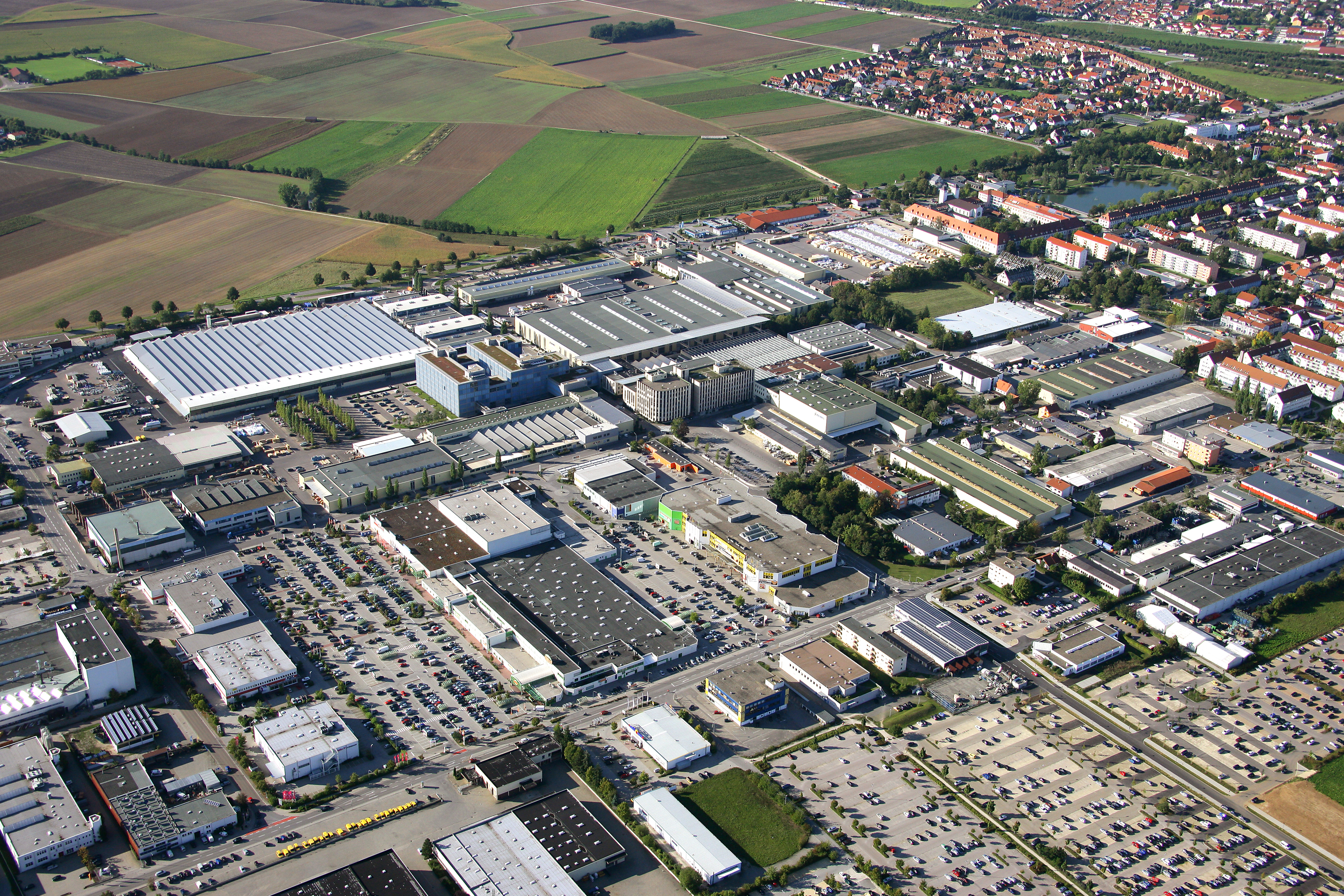
Krones AG company premises in Neutraubling

Subsidiaries

- KIC Krones GmbH (high-tech adhesives for labels and carton packages, plus processing and operating materials), Neutraubling, Germany
- KOSME S.R.L. (filling and packaging machines for mid-tier companies), Roverbella, Italy

Cover additional market segments in beverage filling.

In the year 2019 the enterprise held 5,877 patents and utility models.

== Corporate structure ==
Plastics engineering

Stretch blow-moulding machines for the production of PET bottles of up to a volume of 3 liters, with an output of 12,800 to 90,000 bottles/hour. The PET recycling system is based on a PET Flakes cleaning process equipped with progressive temperature controls and decontamination.

Filling and packing technology

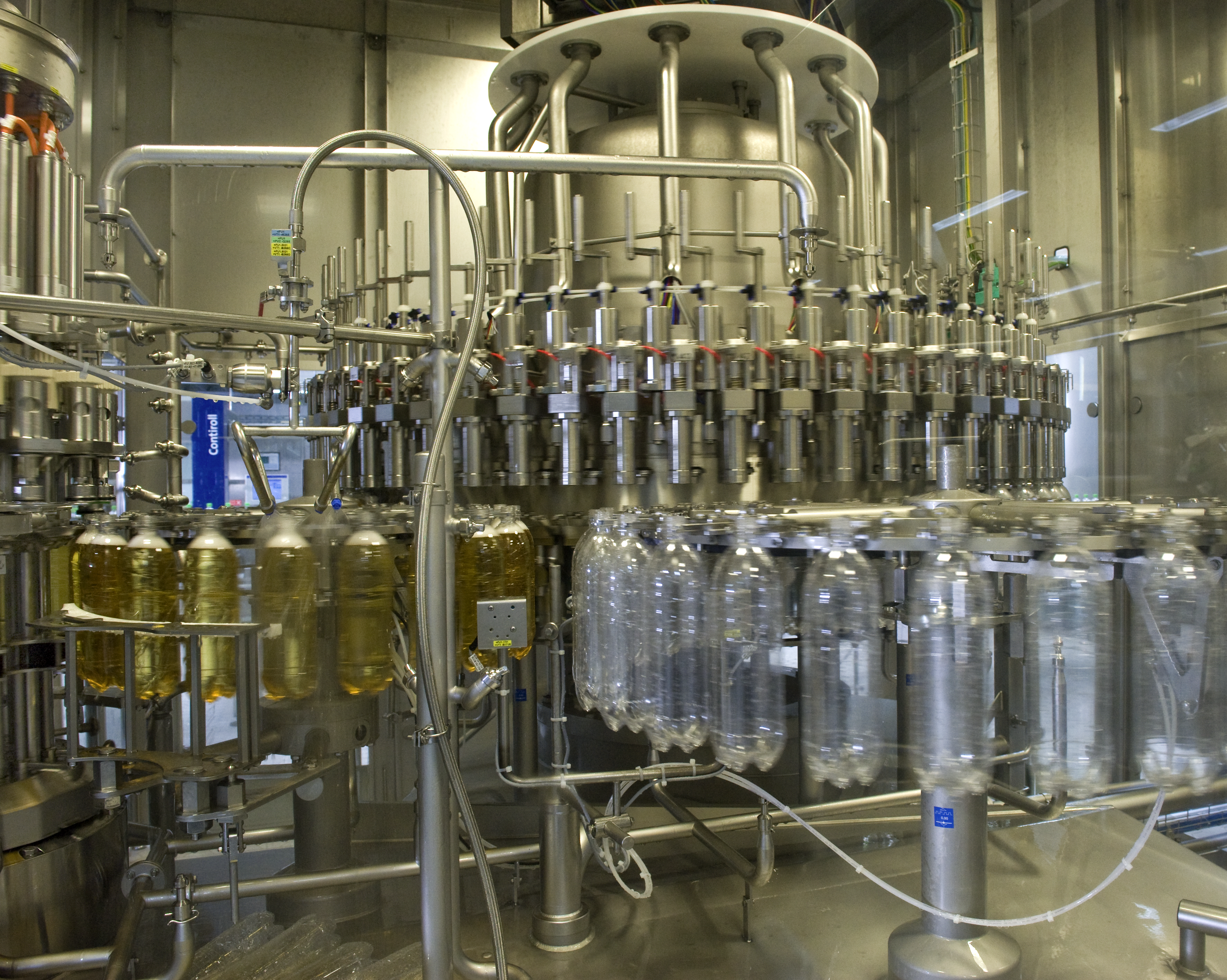
PET bottle filling line

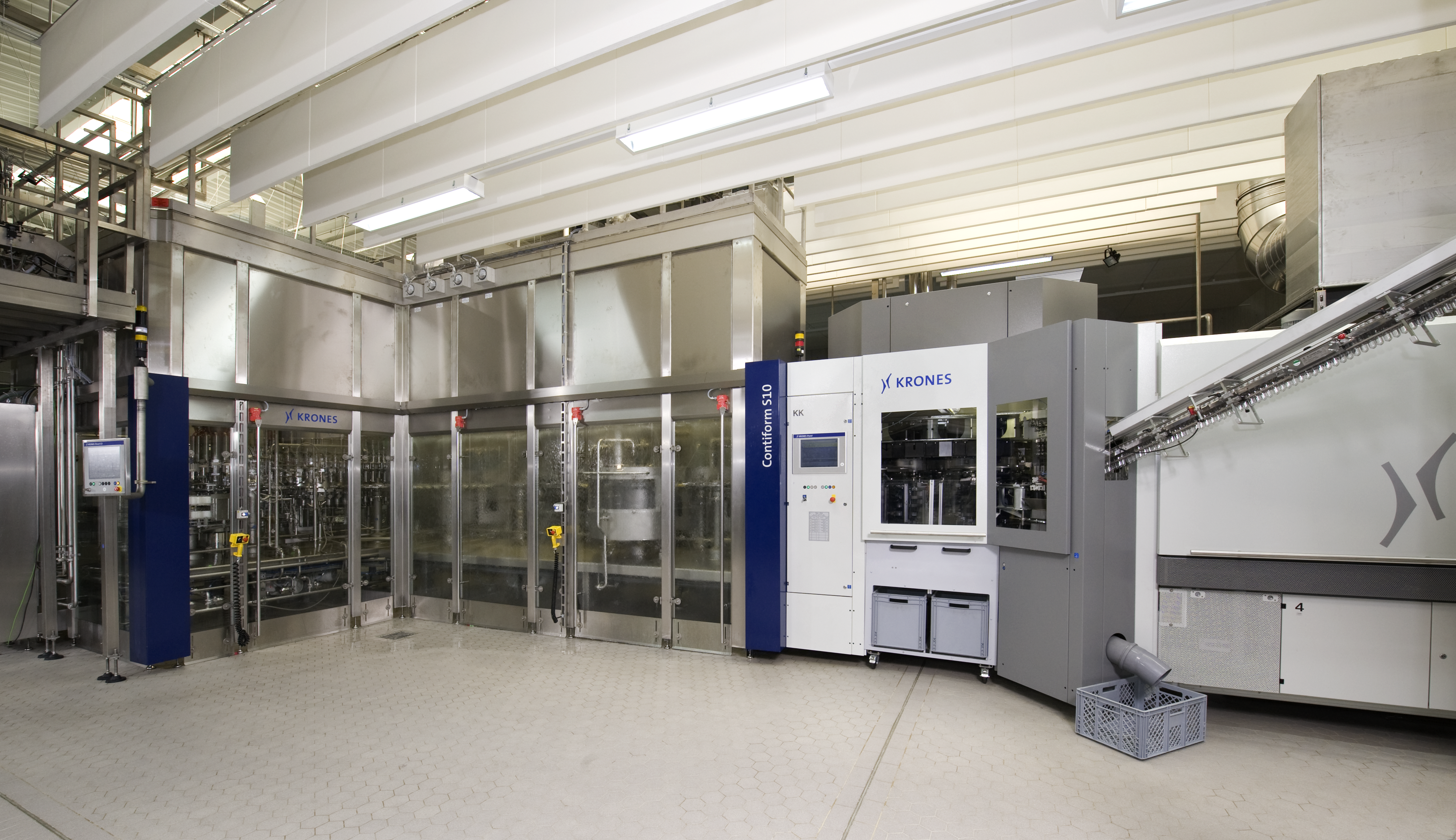
A stretch blow machine (right) and a filling machine (left) in block alignment without intermediary conveyor belts

Rinse, filling and capping lines with a rotary concept. With rotary lines, high-speed tasks of up to 72,000 bottles/hour or approximately 120,000 cans/hour are possible, including aseptic filling systems for beverages with a high pH value (> 4,5). For the disinfection of containers and closures, PES or H_{2}O_{2} is used. Further steps in beverage production as bottle-washing machines, inspection and control systems for bottles and bundles, as well as labelling machines for cold and hot glue or self-adhesive labelling complete the product range. Packaging machines for bundles either one-way or returnable, sorting and grouping stations, as well as palletisation systems supplement the spectrum.

Process engineering

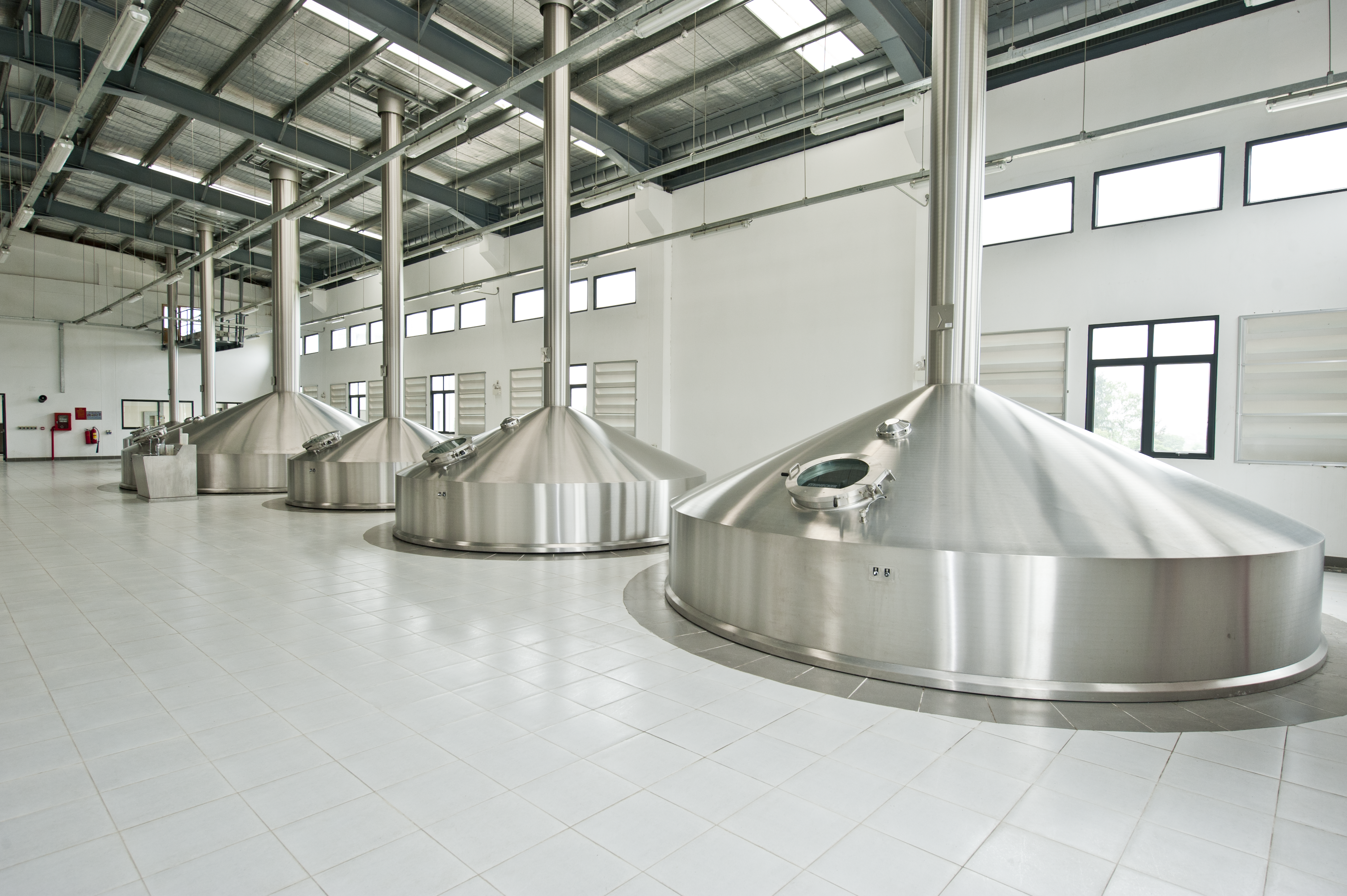
Brewhouse plant

Breweries can be completely equipped with brewhouses, including fermenting and storage cellar equipment, along with assigned supply installations. For manufacturing plants of non-alcoholic beverages' syrup areas, mixing and carbonising equipment are supplied. Heating systems as UHT- and flash heating systems or pasteurizing systems are available for beverage preservation.

IT solutions and material handling systems

The control of production process and the integration of production data into an ERP system. Logistics systems provide production and distribution with raw, operating and auxiliary materials, as well as finished products, with either block storage or automatic warehouse systems, including commissioning equipment, forklift guidance and yard management systems for logistics process in beverage and food plants. Activities for logistics have been pooled in System Logistics, a legally independent unit.

== Notable milestones since 1997 ==
- 1997 Manufacturing of stretch blow-moulding machines for the production of PET bottles
- 2000 First line for aseptic filling of sensitive soft drinks
- 2002 First PET recycling line for recovering PET bottles and re-using them as food-grade raw material
- 2005 Expansion of the firm's aseptic filling technology to include dry sterilisation using H_{2}O_{2}; Krones had already been offering sterilisation with peracetic acid, and is thus the only company to offer both of these technologies.
- 2009 Manufacturing of water treatment systems
- 2010 FlexWave heating system for preforms based on microwave technology for energy saving manufacturing of PET bottles.
- 2011 LitePac: PET bottle formations are provided with strapping tape and a carrying handle only, so that waste from packaging can be reduced by 75% in relation to former shrink film packaging.
- 2015 DecoType Select: selectively direct printing to grooved and relief structures

== Business figures ==
Year	Sales (bn €)	Year	Sales (bn €)	Year	Sales (bn €)	Year	Sales (bn €)
2005	1,695	2010	2,173	2015	3,173	2020	3,323
2006	1,911	2011	2,480	2016	3,391	2021	3,635
2007	2,156	2012	2,664	2017	3,691	2022	4,209
2008	2,381	2013	2,820	2018	3,854	2023	4,721
2009	1,865	2014	2,953	2019	3,959	2024	5,294

Executive board

- Christoph Klenk – Chief Executive Officer
- Uta Anders – Chief Financial Officer
- Thomas Ricker – Chief Sales Officer
- Markus Tischer – Executive Board Member, International Operations & Services
- Ralf Goldbrunner – Executive Board Member, Operations
