= Aseptic processing =

Sterile food processing technique

Aseptic processing is a processing technique wherein commercially thermally sterilized liquid products (typically food or pharmaceutical) are packaged into previously sterilized containers under sterile conditions to produce shelf-stable products that do not need refrigeration. Aseptic processing has almost completely replaced in-container sterilization of liquid foods, including milk, fruit juices and concentrates, cream, yogurt, salad dressing, liquid egg, and ice cream mix. There has been an increasing popularity for foods that contain small discrete particles, such as cottage cheese, baby foods, tomato products, fruit and vegetables, soups, and rice desserts.

Aseptic processing involves three primary steps: thermal sterilization of the product, sterilization of the packaging material, and conservation of sterility during packaging. To ensure commercial sterility, aseptic processing facilities are required to maintain proper documentation of production operations, showing that commercially sterile conditions were achieved and maintained in all areas of the facility. Any breach of a scheduled process for the processing or packaging system means that the affected product must be destroyed, reprocessed or segregated and held for further evaluation. In addition, the processing and packaging system must be cleaned and re-sterilized before processing and/or packaging operations can resume. Packaging equipment and packaging materials are sterilized with various media or combinations thereof (i.e., saturated steam, superheated steam, hydrogen peroxide and heat and other treatments).

== Historical development in foods ==
Aseptic processing was derived from C. Olin Ball's heat-cool-fill (HCF) machine, which was developed in 1927. While HCF was successful in improving the sensory quality of the processed chocolate milk as compared to canned product, the use of the equipment was hindered by its cost, maintenance, and inflexibility to process various container sizes, rendering the machine a failure.

In the 1940s, the Avoset process was developed by George Grindrod. Food products processed using the Avoset process were packaged under ultraviolet lamps and sterilized air inside a positive-pressurized room to keep the contaminants out of the processing room. Sterilization was achieved through the use of direct steam injection of 126–137 °C (260–280 °F) and then cooled. The food treated using this technique was described as an "excellent cream product", and 75–100 containers were produced each minute.

Later in the 1940s, the Dole Aseptic Process was developed by McKinley Martin. The foods processed ranged from soups to specialty sauces, fruits, and dairy products. This process involved four steps:

1. Sterilization of product by heating and immediate cooling
2. Sterilization of containers and lids using steam
3. Filling of cooled products aseptically into previously sterilized containers
4. Sealing of lids at an atmosphere of saturated or superheated steam

The Dole aseptic machine overcame the hindrances that caused HCF's failure, since it was able to process various container sizes, needed less maintenance time, and cost less. The quality of products processed was consistent regardless of container size, an important characteristic for heat-sensitive foods, due to its short processing time. Split pea soup was treated using the Dole aseptic machine at the following dosage: heat time of 140–146 °C (280–290 °F) for 3.53 seconds, hold time of 8.8 seconds, and cooling to 32 °C (90 °F) in 14.0 – 17.0 seconds, compared to the normal processing time of 40–70 minutes at 115–121 °C (240–250 °F). The lack of consumer interest drove the foods that were processed in the Dole aseptic machine to be discontinued.

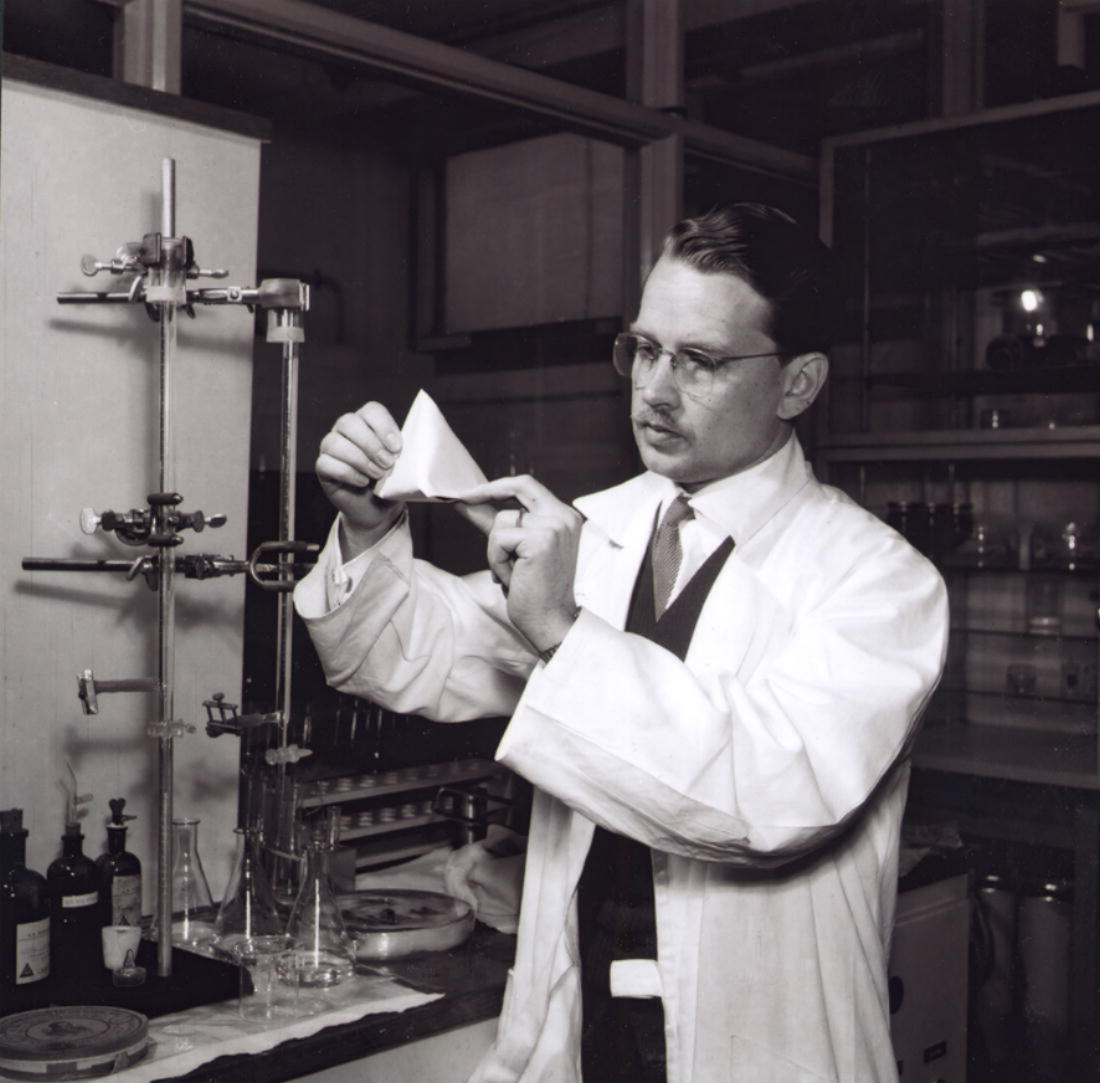
Erik Wallenberg, the inventor of the Tetra Classic packaging at Tetra Pak

Roy Graves began sterilizing milk in the 1940s. The milk that was drawn from the cow went through a pipeline, into a vacuum tank, which was then heated to 285 °F, then cooled to room temperature. The product, packaged in metal cans, was widely accepted by consumers lacking access to fresh milk, including the U.S. military.

In 1959, the food industry saw the advent of the use of paper-foil-plastic laminated containers called tetrahedron. In 1962, the Swedish company Tetra Pak, introduced this container to the United States market. They sold pasteurized milk and beverages in the containers. Roy Graves' company started sterilizing this container with chlorine and was able to aseptically fill and hermetically seal the container. The use of these containers was not accepted by American consumers due to their difficulty in opening. It was widely used by the U.S. Navy.

In 1981, hydrogen peroxide was approved by the FDA to be used to sterilize containers.

Today, ships used for continental food transport are equipped with aseptic tanks to transport fruit juices. Another means of transporting aseptically processed food is the use of aseptic bags.

== Processing ==
Aseptic processing allows for the food to be properly sterilized outside the container and then placed into a previously sterilized container, which is then sealed in a sterile environment. Most systems use ultra-high temperature (UHT) sterilization to sterilize the food product before it is packaged. UHT sterilizes food at high temperatures, usually above 135 C for 1–2 seconds. This is advantageous because it allows for faster processing, usually a few seconds at high temperatures (130–150 °C) and better retention of sensory and nutritional characteristics. Aseptic products have a non-refrigerated shelf-life of a few months to several years.

Sterilization of aseptic packaging material is a crucial step in aseptic food processing. These containers are sterilized to kill microorganisms present on the containers during forming, transport, and before filling. There are numerous methods used to sterilize the containers, the most commonly used methods include: heat, hot water, chemical sterilants (hydrogen peroxide or peracetic acid), and radiation or a combination of methods.

UHT food products can be sterilized using either direct or indirect methods of heat transfer. Direct heat transfer can be achieved through steam injection and steam infusion. Food products processed with a steam injector go through an injection chamber, where steam (150 °C) is injected into the product, then the product is flash cooled to 70 °C. Direct heat transfer is suitable for heat-sensitive foods such as milk. However, only low viscosity liquids can be processed using steam injection, and high-quality steam is required to ensure sterilization. Steam-infused food products involve food free-falling into highly pressurized steam, which heats the food to approximately 145 °C, and then it is flash cooled to 65–70 °C. Steam infusion provides processors with great control compared to steam injection, and the risk of burn-on and overheating is reduced. It can process higher viscosity foods compared to steam injection, but risks the blockage of nozzles in machinery. Indirect forms of heat transfer include: plate heat exchangers, tubular heat exchangers, or scraped-surface heat exchangers. Plate heat exchangers are mostly used because they are inexpensive and allow for easy changes during production. Tubular and scraped-surface can heat viscous food with particulates or high pulp content with minimal damage.

=== Equipment and systems ===
Equipment used in aseptic processing of food and beverages must be sterilized before processing and remain sterile during processing. When designing aseptic processing equipment there are six basic requirements to consider: the equipment must have the capability of being cleaned thoroughly, it must be able to be sterilized with steam, chemicals, or high-temperature water, sterilization media should be able to contact all surfaces of the equipment, meaning the equipment does not contain any cracks, crevices or dead spots, the equipment must be able to be kept in a sterile state, it must have the ability to be used continuously, and lastly, the equipment must comply with regulations.

Aseptic packaging are generally placed in the following categories: fill, erect, form, thermoform, blow mold, and bulk packaging and storage systems.

1. Fill and seal. The containers are filled and sealed in a sterile environment to avoid contamination.
2. Erect, fill and seal. A plastic container is erected then sterilized, filled and sealed.
3. Form, fill and seal. In this system, a roll of film is first sterilized. After sterilization it is formed into the desired shape, filled and sealed.
4. Thermoform, fill and seal. A roll of film is heated and thermoform on a sterile surface or environment. It is then filled and seal, also in a sterile environment.
5. Blow mold, fill and seal. The process requires an extrudable material to be first blow-molded into a sterile package before filling and sealing. This process is usually used to produce bottle products like juices and sodas.
6. Bulk packaging and storage systems. Packaging used for bulk storage (drums, totes, bags, etc.) are sterilized using either heat or disinfectants. After sterilization they are able to be filled and sealed.

== Packaging material ==
Aseptic packaging consists of filling and sealing a sterilized packaging material with a sterilized product. Aseptic packaging material not only has to assure sterile conditions within the package and protect the product from physical damage, but also maintain the quality of the product inside the packaging. To achieve this, a laminate material is formed from the following components: semi-rigid paper, aluminum, and plastic. Paper (70%) provides the stiffness, strength, and the efficient brick shape to the package; potential for bacteria needs to be addressed. Low-density polyethylene (24%), the most common plastic used for aseptic packaging, located on the innermost layer forms the seals that make the package liquid-tight. Aluminum (6%) is located on the inside of the aseptic package, forming a barrier against light and oxygen, thereby eliminating the need for refrigeration and preventing spoilage without using preservatives. Most packaging material used in aseptic packaging is made from plastics instead of metal or glass containers due to the relatively low cost of producing plastic material when compared to metal and glass. Plastics are lighter than metal or glass making them cheaper and easier to transport. Plastics also required much less energy to produce than metal and glass. These factors have made plastic the packaging material of choice for use in aseptic processing.

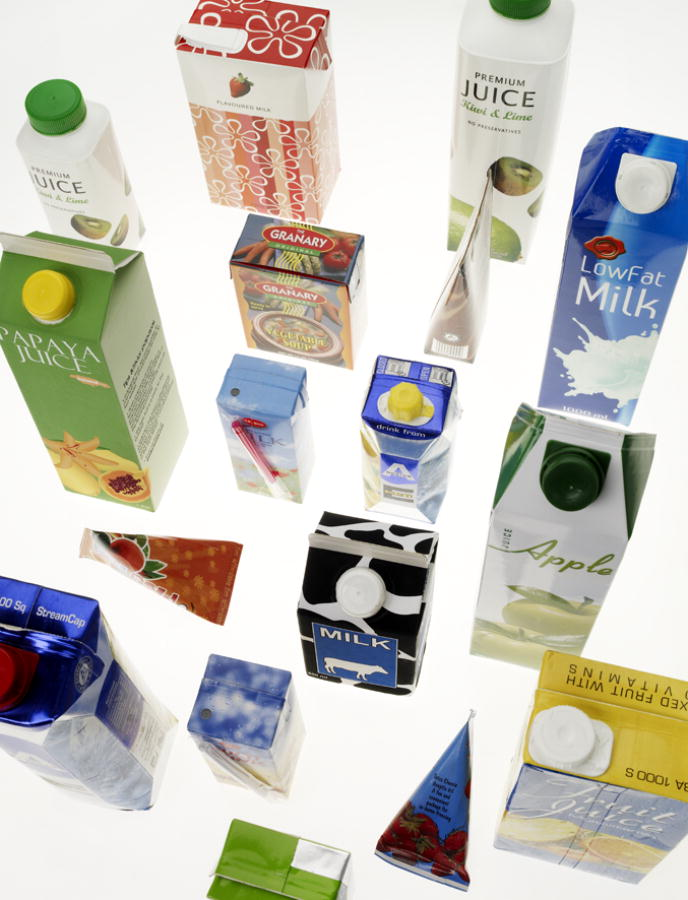
Aseptic packaging material made by Tetra Pak

=== Selection of aseptic containers ===
There are a lot of factors that can influence the type of aseptic container chosen for a product. The following factors may influence the choice of packaging material for aseptically processed products: functional properties of the plastic polymer (gas and water vapor barrier properties, chemical inertness, and flavor and odor absorption or flavor scalping), potential interactions between plastic polymer and food product, desired shelf life, economical costs, mechanical characteristics of the packaging material (molding properties, material handling characteristics, and compatibility with packaging and sterilization methods), shipping and handling conditions (toughness, compression), compliance with regulation, and targeted consumer group.

There are a range of different types of containers to choose from depending on the product. The table below offers a few container types and examples.

Selection of aseptic containers
Container Type	Examples	Container Characteristics
Rigid containers	Metal cans, totes, glass bottles, and jars	
Paperboard Containers	Webfed and Rollfed paper/foil/plastic cartons and preformed cartons	
Semi-rigid plastic containers	Webfed thermoformed cups, tubs, and trays Preformed cups, tubs, trays, and bottles	High production rates Operation flexibility, container quality able to be checked in advance
Flexible plastic containers	Pouches, sachets, etc.	

== Effects on food quality ==
Aseptic processing preserves food quality through fast heat treatment followed by a short holding time and rapid cooling. Compared to canning where food products are subjected to high temperature processing, the fast heat treatment provided by aseptic processing enables heat-sensitive characteristics of the food to be better retained.

=== Flavor ===
The flavor of aseptically processed food products is minimally changed. Dairy products could have a cooked flavor because of exposure to sulfhydryl groups. The flavor is reduced during storage as the sulfhydryl groups oxidize. Severely treated milk could have a bitter flavor because of proteolysis.

=== Color ===
Dairy products could have changes in color, an effect caused by Maillard browning. This depends on the amount of reducing sugar, the formation of pyralysins and melanoidins, the severity of the treatment, and the storage temperature.

Plant pigments, carotene and betanin, are not affected, while chlorophyll and anthocyanins are minimally reduced.

=== Texture ===
Meat is less likely to toughen when aseptically processed, compared to canned products.

Fruit juice viscosity is unaffected. Processed sliced fruit and vegetable pieces are softer compared to unprocessed pieces as a result of the solubilization of pectic materials and loss of cell turgor.

=== Nutritional value ===
Aseptic Processing achieves sterility through a flash-heating process with temperatures ranging from 91 °C to 146 °C and is minimally processed. Due to the significantly lower processing time and temperature range used in aseptic processing compared to conventional sterilization, such as canning, products that are aseptically processed are able to retain more nutrients. Riboflavin, pantothenic acid, biotin, niacin, and vitamin B6 are unaffected. Approximately 10% of thiamine and vitamin B12, approximately 15% of folic acid and pyridoxine, and approximately 25% of vitamin C are lost during aseptic processing.

== Advantages and limitations ==
=== Advantages ===
Foods that are processed aseptically have better nutritional, vitamin, and natural pigment retention (chlorophyll, anthocyanins, betalains, carotenoids) compared to canned food products because of the lower temperature the foods are subjected to upon processing. Aseptic processing provides flexibility in using various container sizes as well as possibility of addition of bioactive and heat-sensitive components after processing (probiotics, omega-3 fatty acids, conjugated linoleic acids).

=== Limitations ===
Aseptic processing costs more than canning because sterilization of the packaging materials requires different machinery and can get complex. In addition, maintaining air sterility in the processing room is difficult.

== FDA inspection and regulation for aseptic processing ==
Inspections of aseptic processing is one of the most complex inspection of food manufacturing operations. Process authorities are required to establish a process that ensures commercial sterility for the following:

1. The product
2. All equipment including the hold tube and any equipment downstream from the holding tube such as the filler
3. The packaging equipment
4. The packaging material.

Documentation of production operations must be maintained by the facility, showing an achievement of commercial sterile conditions in all areas of the facility.

The general regulatory requirements for all U.S Food and Drug Administration (FDA) regulated foods are found in section 21 of the U.S. Code of Federal Regulations (CFR) Part 117. Section 113.40 lists specific requirements for aseptic processing and packaging systems, including specifications for equipment and instrumentation. One requirement of the FDA regulations is that all thermal processing operations must be conducted under the operating supervision of an individual who has completed an FDA-approved course of instruction on control of thermal processing systems, container closures, and acidification procedures. The Better Process Control School provides a section on aseptic processing and packaging systems, and will meet the FDA requirement for supervisors of aseptic operations.

Processing authorities are responsible for aseptic systems must be aware of certain factors unique to aseptic processing and packaging operations, therefore specific knowledge in this area is essential. Neither the FDA nor other regulatory agency maintains a list of recognized processing authorities, however, certain organizations are widely recognized within government agencies and the industry as having the experience and expertise. The FDA regulations rely upon aseptic processing and packaging authorities to establish parameters for sterilization of product, packages, and equipment so that commercial sterility of the end product is assured.

The forms presently used to file aseptic processes for low-acid foods with the FDA is Form 2541c. Processes for acidified foods that are aseptically processes and packaged are filed under 2541a. Additionally, processing plants must be registered with the FDA using Form 2541. The FDA has also developed a Low-acid Canned Food (LACF) Electronic Process Filling System that facilitates the completion and submission of the forms.

The FDA does exert authority over the types of aseptic processing and packaging systems that can be utilized to produce foods for distribution in U.S. commerce by reviewing and either accepting or rejecting process filing forms from individual processing firms. The FDA may request sufficient technical information from the processor to evaluate adequacy of the equipment and the procedures used to produce a commercially sterile product. Until the FDA finds no further objections to a process filing, the company is prevented from distributing product produced on that system in interstate commerce.

Final aseptic products must undergo an incubation test before the product is released into distribution. The firm must determine the time and temperature of incubation as well as how many containers are incubated. It is generally accepted to incubate at 20–25 °C for a minimum of 7 days followed immediately, or after a first reading, by incubation at 30–35 °C for a total minimum incubation time of 14 days. Other incubation schedules should be based on supporting validation data. Prior to incubation, the containers with the microbial growth medium must be inverted to ensure all surfaces are thoroughly wetted by the medium.

The FDA relies on periodic inspections of processing plants to monitor compliance with its regulatory requirements. Inspection frequency for an individual plant may vary significantly depending upon products packed, occurrence of potential hazardous processing problems at the plant, and availability of FDA inspection personnel.

== See also ==
- Blow fill seal
- Cosmetics
- Dietary supplement
- Food and Bioprocess Technology
- Food chemistry
- Food engineering
- Food fortification
- Food microbiology
- Food packaging
- Food preservation
- Food rheology
- Food science
- Food storage
- Food supplements
- Food safety
- Food technology
- Liquid packaging board
- Nutraceutical
- Nutrification (aka food enrichment or fortification)
- Pharmaceuticals
- Retort pouch
- Ultra-high-temperature processing
- Tetra Pak
