= Knockout punch =

Hand tool for punching holes through sheet metal

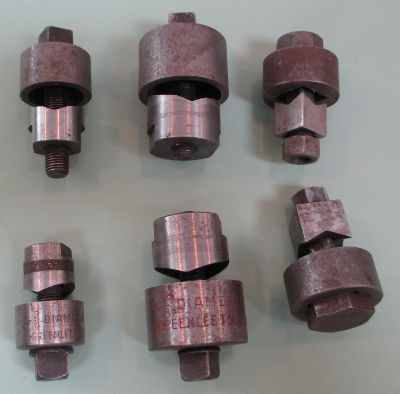
Chassis punches: assorted sizes round and square

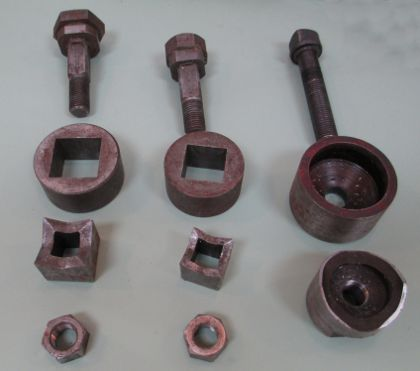
Chassis punches: assorted sizes round and square disassembled

In metalworking, a knockout punch, also known as a chassis punch, panel punch, Greenlee punch, or a Q-max, is a hand tool used to punch a hole through sheet metal. It is a very simple tool that consists of a punch, die, and screw. There are three different drive systems: manual, ratchet, and hydraulic.

== Operation ==
First a pilot hole is drilled slightly larger than the screw of the knockout punch. Then the die is placed on the screw and the screw is inserted into the pilot hole. The screw is then threaded into the punch and the screw tightened until the punch is drawn completely through the sheet metal.

The manual system uses a screw that has a standard hex head or square head and is driven using an allen key or wrench. A manual knockout punch can handle holes from 0.5 to 1.25 in (13 to 32 mm). The ratchet system has a custom ratcheting wrench that uses a ball screw to make the process faster and easier. This type of system has a mechanical advantage of approximately 220:1 and can punch holes up to 3 in (76 mm) in diameter in 10 gauge mild steel. A hydraulic system is much bulkier and heavier than the other systems but it is the easiest to use and can make holes up to 6 in (150 mm) in diameter. It is a two-piece system where the dies are attached to the ram which is connected to the hydraulic unit via a flexible hose.

== Size families and shapes ==
There are several sizing systems for these punches. The two most common are those sized for standard electrical knockout sizes and those that are for true dimensional holes. A 3/4 inch conduit size punch actually punches a hole that is approximately 1.1 inches diameter for 3/4 nominal size conduit. A dimensional size punch makes a hole very close to the indicated size. Punch sets are available on both imperial and metric sizes.

Chassis punches are available in a number of shapes, round being the most common. Other shapes include square, hexagonal, and special shapes for thing such as holes with key tabs and D-sub connectors Special shapes often use bolts that are square or keyed and a separate nut on the punch end to ensure alignment of the punch and die.
