= Neutraubling =

- Town
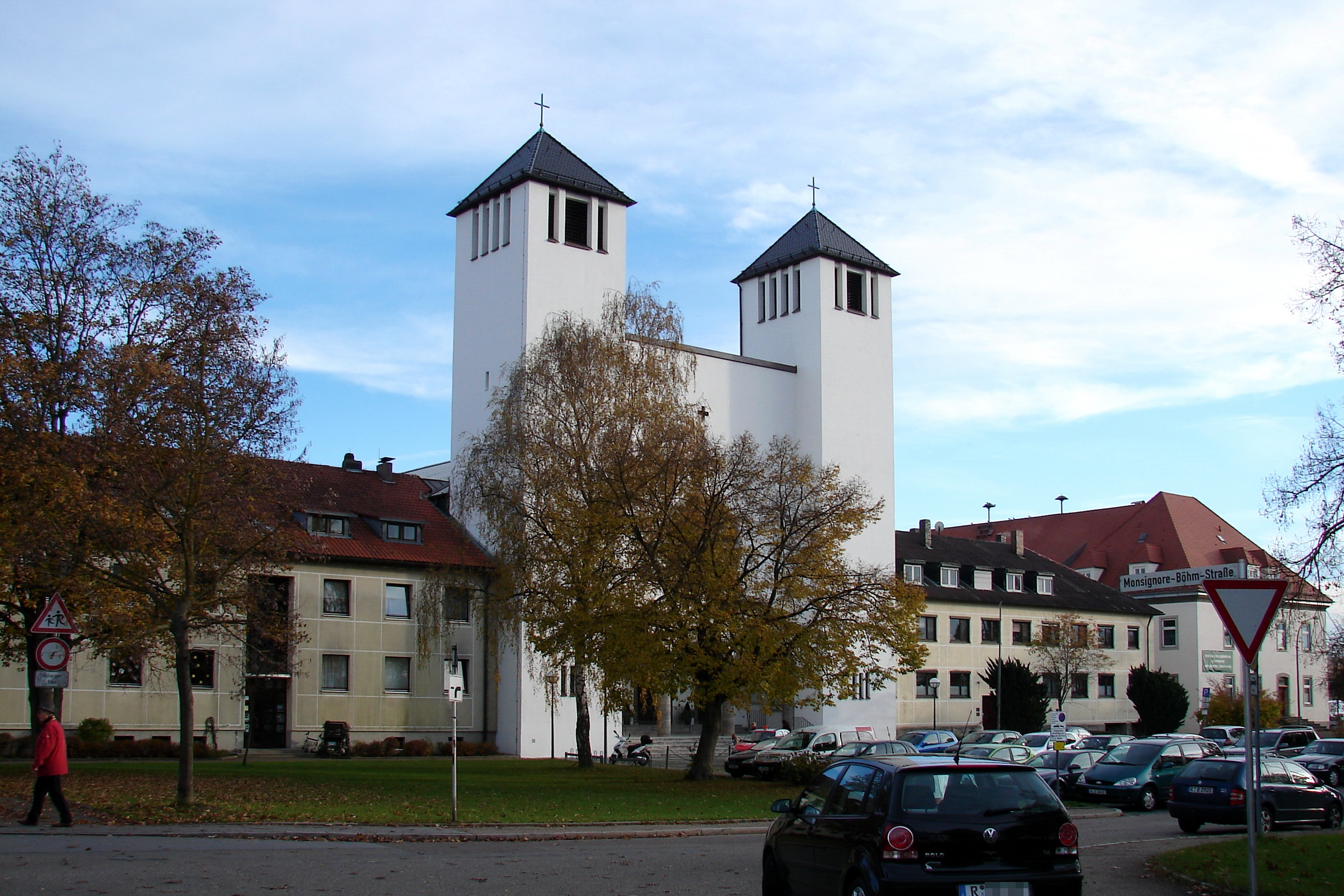
- Town square with the Church of Saint Michael

- Coat of arms

- Location of Neutraubling within Regensburg district
- Interactive map of Neutraubling
- Location within Germany Location within Bavaria
- Coordinates: 48°59′37″N 12°11′43″E
- Country: Germany
- State: Bavaria
- Admin. region: Oberpfalz
- District: Regensburg
- Subdivisions: 2 Stadtteile

Government
  - Mayor (2020–26): Harald Stadler (FW)

Area
  - Total: 9.75 km^{2} (3.76 sq mi)
- Elevation: 330 m (1,080 ft)

Population (2025-12-31)
  - Total: 14,351
  - Density: 1,470/km^{2} (3,810/sq mi)
- Time zone: UTC+01:00 (CET)
  - Summer (DST): UTC+02:00 (CEST)
- Postal codes: 93073
- Dialling codes: 09401
- Vehicle registration: R
- Website: www.neutraubling.de

Neutraubling (German pronunciation: [nɔʏˈtʁaʊplɪŋ]) is a town in the state of Bavaria in southern Germany, in the district of Regensburg.

The town has only existed since 1951. After the second world war, displaced ethnic Germans from Sudetenland (Czech Lands) or former eastern territories of Germany (Poland) settled in the ruins of the bombed military airport. Today, it is a more or less important industrial site.

During the Second World War, Neutraubling was used as an airbase and factory for the Messerschmitt aircraft manufacturing company.

Between the end of 1940 and April 23, 1945, the factory was able to house up to 2,750 slave laborers at a time.

Between 20 February 1945 and 26 April 1945, inmates of Flossenbürg concentration camp were held there until forced into a 'death march' to Dachau concentration camp.

Even today, it is possible to find relics of the early history of Neutraubling and its airbase past. For example, what is known as the "Schlangenbau", which is now home to people from various nations all over the world, was the command centre of the airbase. The small pond located next to the Schlangenbau was used as a water reservoir for the airbase fire brigade.

Even the Catholic church there still harbours various signs of the past. It is said that parts of the wall of the church were taken from a destroyed hangar. The main road leading through the city itself has its roots in one of the World War II airstrips.

Despite Neutraubling's earliest roots dating back to the stone age period, it can't compete with Regensburg's rich history. Neutraubling also provides a fully fledged education infrastructure starting with three kindergartens up to a grammar school. Furthermore, Neutraubling is also home to various medium-sized and internationally operating enterprises, e.g. Krones, which has its very roots in this city. Nightlife in Neutraubling is what can be expected from a city of only 13,000 inhabitants.

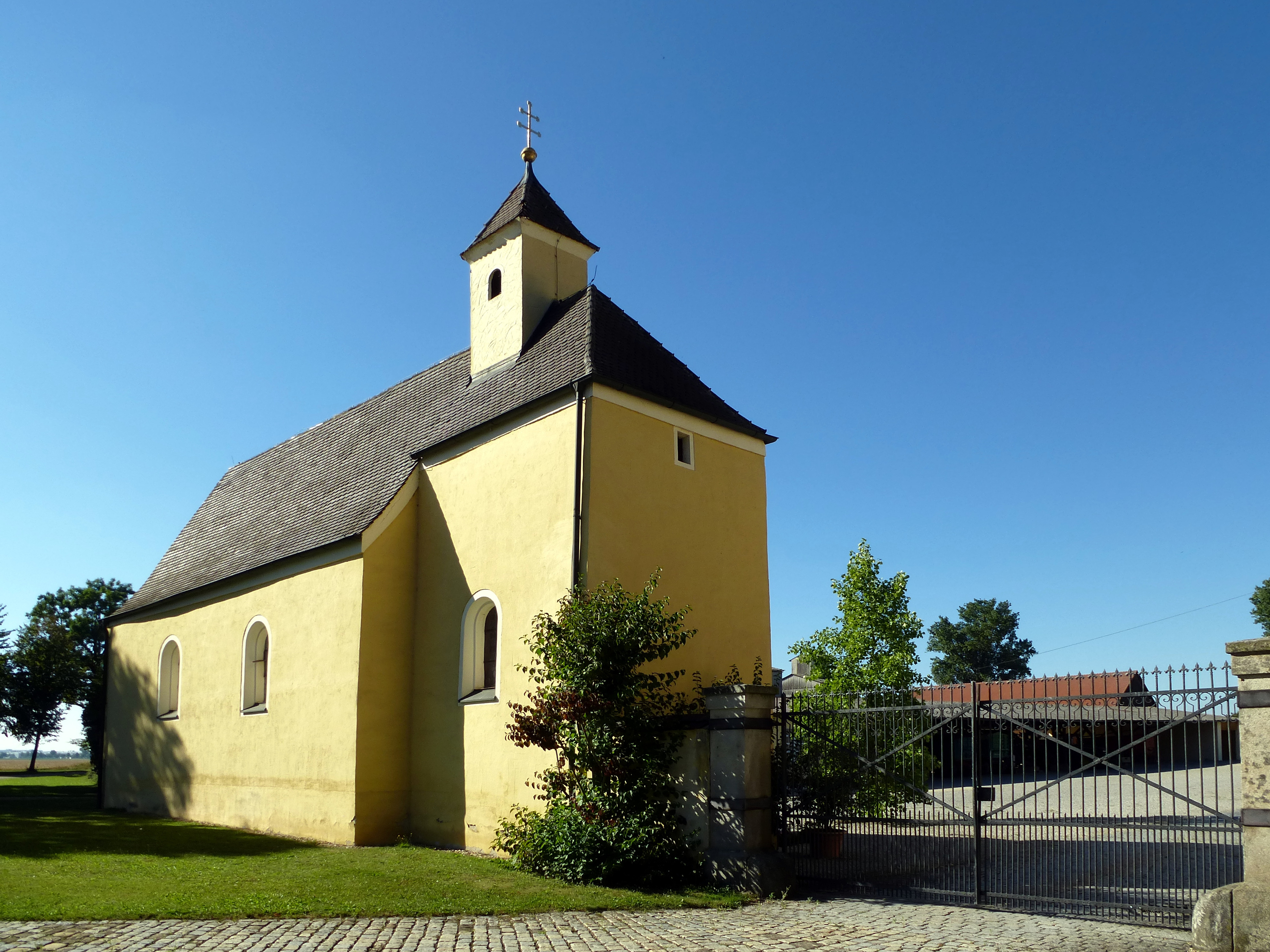
Church of St. Peter in Lerchenfeld

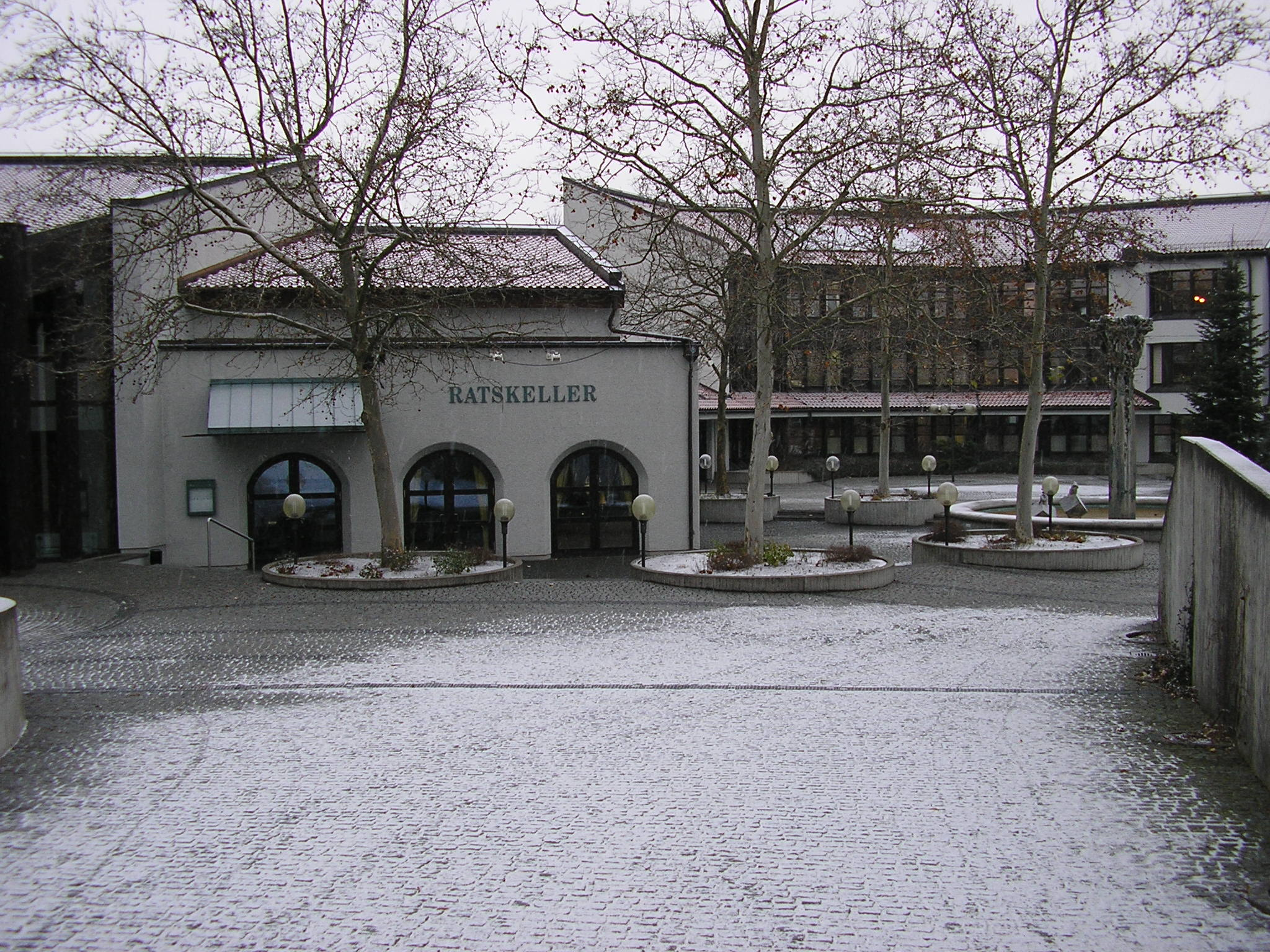
Town hall

== Number of inhabitants ==
Day	Inhabitants
01.04.1947	53
01.04.1951	1.296
01.01.1960	3.755
06.06.1961	3.994
27.05.1970	6.097
01.01.1976	6.614
04.07.1988	10.036
31.12.2004	12.950
31.12.2007	12.509
31.12.2010	12.808
31.12.2013	13.255
31.12.2015	13.431

== Mayors since 1951 ==
- Hans Herget (SPD) 1951-1965
- Herbert Scholz, (1923-2007), (Free Voters) 1965-1988
- Eleonore Mayer (SPD) 1988-June 2006
- Heinz Kiechle (CSU) July 2006-April 2020
- Harald Stadler (Free Voters) May 2020 – present

== Local council ==
The local council has 24 members.

- CSU: 10 seats
- SPD: 4 seats
- Active citizens: 5 seats
- Free voters: 5 seats

(Elections of the year 2014)
