= Plastic forming machine =

Plastic forming machines, or plastic molding machines, were developed on the basis of rubber machinery and metal die-casting machines. After the inception of the polymer injection molding process in the 1870s, plastic-forming machines were rapidly developed up until the 1930s. With the gradual commercialization of plastic molding equipment, injection molding and extrusion molding became the most common industrialized processes. Blow molding is the third-largest plastic molding method after the injection molding and extrusion blow molding methods.

== Types of plastic forming machine ==
=== Plastic injection molding machine ===
A plastic injection molding machine injects melted plastic into a mold to make solid plastic parts.

=== Plastic extrusion machine ===
A plastic extrusion machine extrudes plastic in a continuous profile. The main machine is usually called the host, and its accompanying equipment are called the plastic auxiliary equipment. Plastic extruders can make plastic film/wrapping, packing tape, corrugated sheets, plastic lumber, pipes, tubes, insulated wire, monofilament and nets.

=== Plastic blow molding machine ===
A plastic blow molding machine inflates a preform or parison inside of a mold to form hollow parts.

=== Thermoforming ===
Thermoforming is a manufacturing process where a plastic sheet is heated to a pliable forming temperature, and stamped to a specific shape in a 2-part mold. Or a vacuum can be used to pull the plastic sheet onto the mold in a simplified process known as vacuum forming. The excess material is trimmed off and recycled.

=== Rotational molding ===
Rotational molding involves a heated hollow mold that is filled with a charge or shot weight of material. It is then slowly rotated (usually around two perpendicular axes), causing the softened material to disperse and stick to the walls of the mold forming a hollow part. In order to form an even thickness throughout the part, the mold rotates at all times during the heating phase, and then continues to rotate during the cooling phase to avoid sagging or deformation. Rotocasting is a variant of the process that uses self-curing or UV-curable resins (as opposed to thermoplastics) in an unheated mold.

== See also ==
Mold-A-Rama
