= Mold-A-Rama =

Type of vending machine

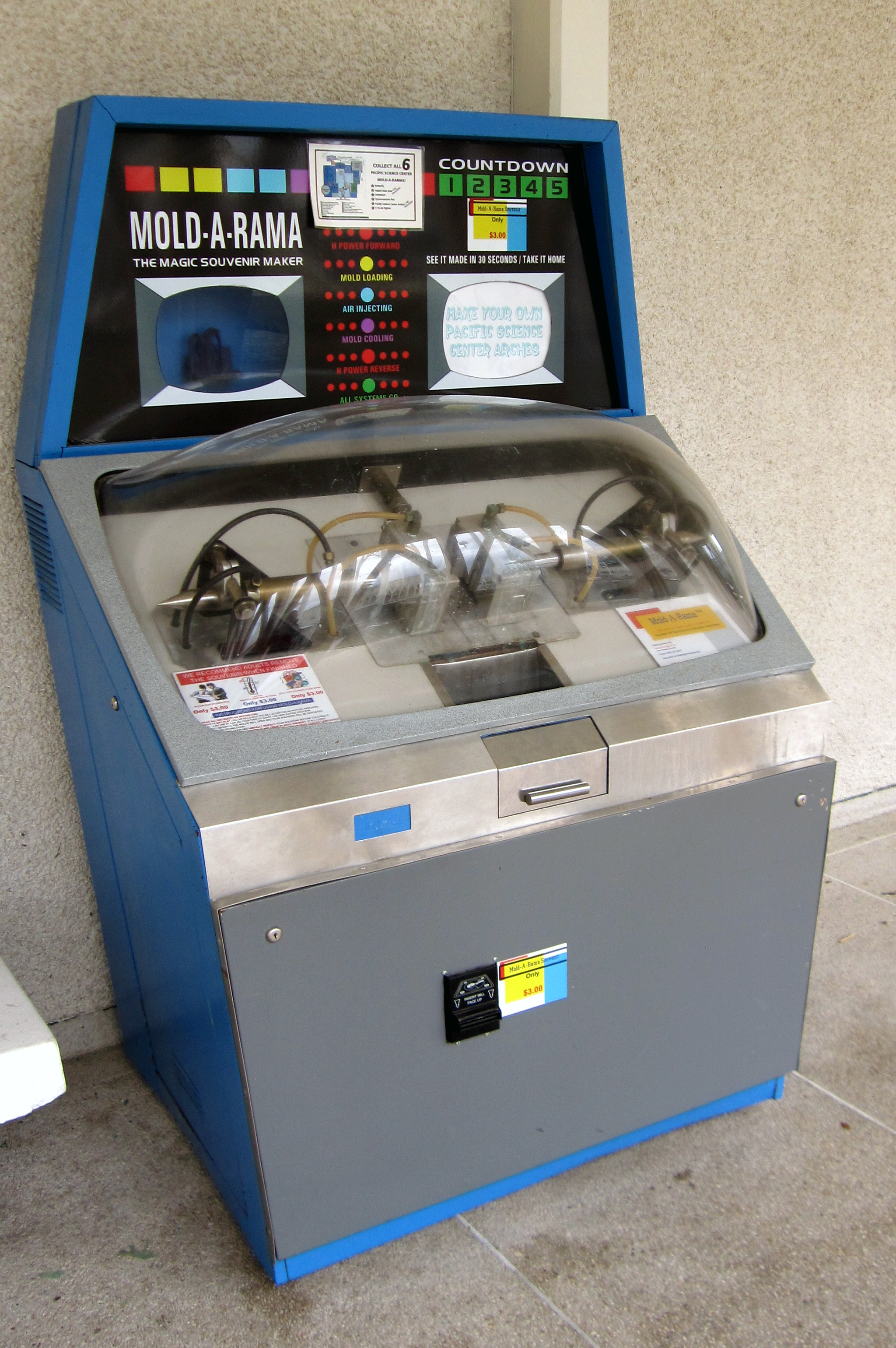
A Mold-A-Rama machine at the Pacific Science Center in Seattle

A tractor from a Mold-A-Rama machine at the Museum of Science and Industry in Chicago

Mold-A-Rama is an American brand name for a type of vending machine that makes injection molded plastic figurines. Mold-A-Rama machines debuted in late 1962 and grew in prominence after appearing at the 1964 New York World's Fair. The machines can still be found operating in dozens of museums and zoos in the U.S.

Although they can be found in several states across the country, Mold-A-Rama machines are especially associated with Chicago, Illinois, where the machines were manufactured. Mold-A-Rama machines are a well known feature at several Chicago-area museums, with 6 machines at the Field Museum, 7 at the Museum of Science and Industry, and 13 at Brookfield Zoo.

== History ==
American inventor John H. "Tike" Miller from Quincy, Illinois, is credited with conceiving a free-standing plastic injection molding machine in the 1950s. The first Mold-A-Rama machines debuted at the 1962 Seattle World's Fair, further gaining noteriety two years later with an appearance at the New York World's Fair as part of Sinclair Oil's "Dinoland" exhibit; for 25 cents, visitors could watch as the machine molded a toy dinosaur souvenir for them. In 1966, the first machine was installed at Brookfield Zoo in Chicago; in 1971 the Zoo installed another 10. Miller licensed his mold-making patent and related technology to the Automatic Retailers Of America (Aramark), which operated Mold-A-Rama machines as a subsidiary company through 1969. Aramark produced the machines in Chicago, building hundreds of Mold-A-Rama machines during the 1960s.

Aramark divested all machines and service locations by 1972 because of the high cost of the equipment. As of 2023, two U.S. companies own and operate Mold-A-Rama machines: Mold-A-Rama Inc. in Brookfield, Illinois, and Unique Souvenirs Inc. in Lake Wales, Florida, where the machines are known as Mold-A-Matic. As of November 2015, there are 124 machines in eight states.

In 2022, to mark the brand's 60th anniversary, Chicago's Museum of Science and Industry featured an exhibit dedicated to the history of the Mold-A-Rama, with many rare and experimental models on display.

== See also ==
- Plastic forming machine
- 3D printing
