= Blow fill seal =

Plastic container manufacturing process

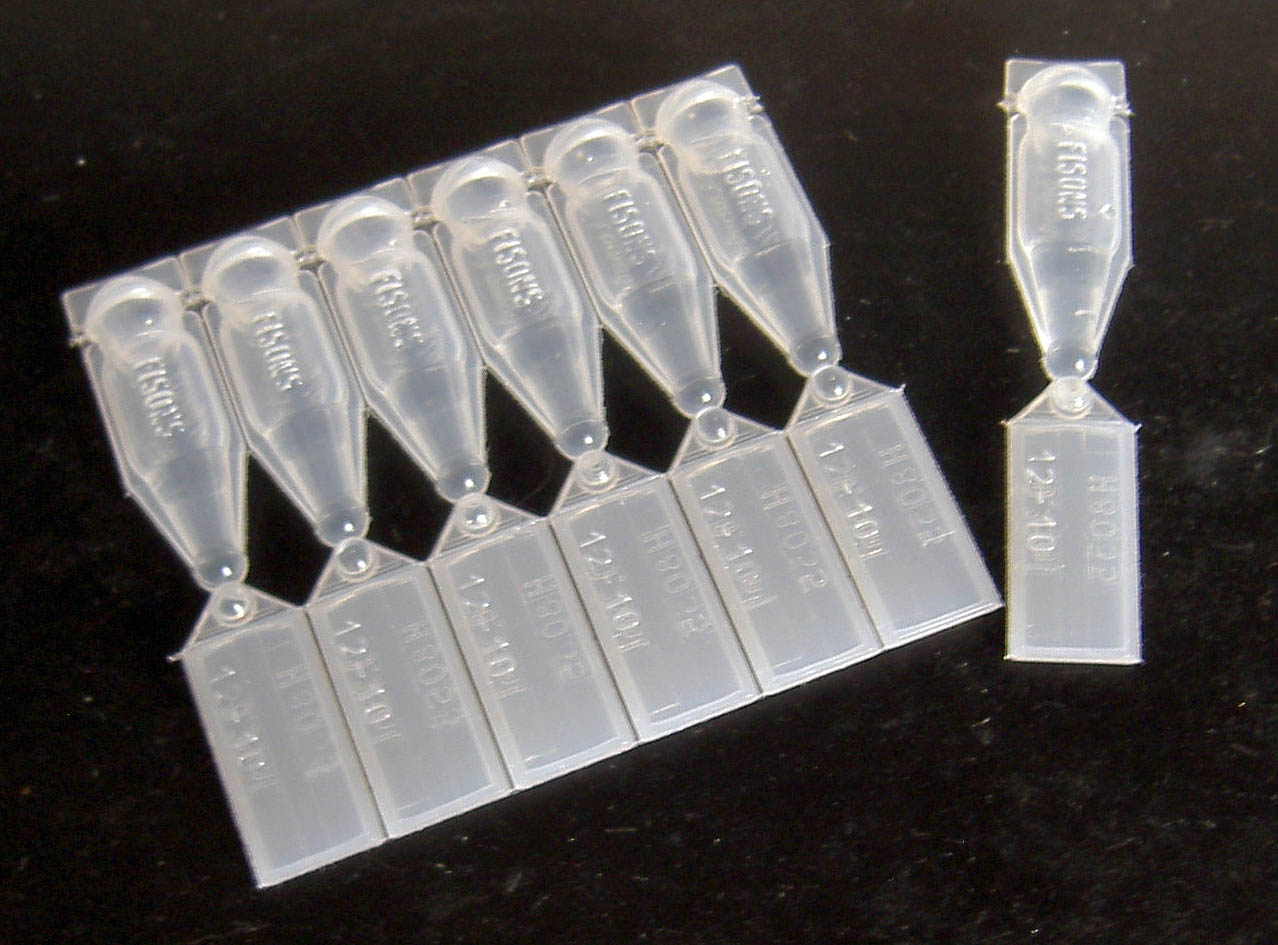
BFS-packaged eye drops for single use

Blow-Fill-Seal, also spelled as Blow/Fill/Seal, in this article abbreviated as BFS, is an automated manufacturing process by which plastic containers, such as bottles or ampoules are, in a continuous operation, blow-formed, filled, and sealed. It takes place in a sterile, enclosed area inside a machine, without human intervention, and thus can be used to aseptically manufacture sterile pharmaceutical or non-pharmaceutical liquid/semiliquid unit-dosage forms. BFS is an advanced aseptic processing technology that is typically used for filling and packaging of certain sterile liquid formulations like liquid ophthalmics, inhalational anesthetics, or lavaging agents, but can also be used for injectables, parenteral medicines, and several other liquid or semiliquid medications, with fill volumes ranging from 0.1...1000 cm^{3}. Compared against traditional glass ampoules, BFS ampoules are inexpensive, lightweight, and shatterproof.

== History ==
BFS was developed in the early 1960s at Rommelag. In 1963, Gerhard Hansen applied for a patent on the BFS process. Originally, it was used for packaging of non-sterile products, such as non-sterile medical devices, food, and cosmetics. In the early 1970s, Rommelag's Bottelpack system was first used for packing large volume pharmaceutical solutions. By the late 1980s, BFS had been well-established in the packaging industry, especially for packaging pharmaceutical and healthcare products. During the 1980s and 1990s, BFS came into use for the now common small volume unit-dosage forms. Since the early 2000s, BFS has been emerging as the preferred packaging process for parenteral products.

== BFS process ==
The BFS process functions similarly to conventional extrusion blow molding, and takes place within a BFS machine. First, a plastic polymer resin is heated to >160 °C and compressed to 35 MPa, allowing it to be extruded in tubular form, and be taken over by an open two-part mold to form the container. Then, the mold closes which welds the bottom of the container. Simultaneously, the parison above the mold is cut, or the filling needles are placed in the parison head without the parison being cut (rotary BFS type). Next, a filling mandrel with blowing air function is placed in the neck area that seals the container. Sterile compressed air is then introduced through the filling mandrel to inflate and form the container. In the BFS process for smaller ampoules the compressed air system is avoided by using vacuum forming the container instead. After the BFS container has been formed, the desired liquid is filled into the container through the filling mandrel unit. Then, the filling mandrel unit is lifted off, and the head mold hermetically seals the container. Simultaneously, the head contour is formed by vacuum. In the last step, the mold opens and the finished container leaves the mold.

One process cycle takes a few seconds. The process speed and thus process output largely depends upon the BFS container size and the BFS machinery dimensioning. For instance, in the early 2000s, Rommelag's 3012, 305, and 4010 M machines had outputs of approximately 4000, 8000, or 20,000 containers per hour. These machines have been succeeded by the Rommelag 312, 321, 360, 364 and 460 machines with output ranges of up to 35,000 containers per hour.

=== Sterility requirements ===
The BFS processes is an aseptic filling process, which produces sterile products and thus needs to be sterile. Aseptic BFS machines must be designed in a way that prevents extraneous contamination. Thus, rotary-type BFS machines are placed in classified areas same as shuttle-type BFS machines (open parison), which have a cleanroom shroud grade-A-compliant provided with sterilised air and kept under overpressure. Automatic SIP programs are used to sterilise the BFS equipment and this avoids human interventions. Due to automatic start up and filling processes BFS machines require no human interaction during the actual BFS process. However, certain adjustments or interventions need to be carried out by personnel. Both particle and microbiological contamination monitoring are required in a BFS machine environment, as well as routine CIP/SIP processes. BFS machines are typically fitted with several different sterilising air filtration systems for the buffer air, support parison air and air shroud grade A air (if needed for shuttle machines, e. g. open parison type ones). Typically, the air is sterilised by filtration systems that have automatic filter integrity testing installed (i. e. automatic water intrusion or particle testing). The air systems are typically integrated into the SIP cycle of the BFS machine.

=== BFS material ===
The materials used in BFS packaging are usually polyolefins, mainly polyethylene (LDPE or HDPE), and polypropylene (PP). These materials are robust and inert to ensure sterility and tightness during the product's shelf life. Diffusion tendencies can be reduced by using virgin polymers, but diffusion cannot be prevented entirely. This is due to the nature of polyolefins and their additives, if present. Several polyethylene suppliers have developed special EP or USP grade resin for BFS containers. Permeation into BFS containers and water loss may be an issue with some BFS resin. Therefore, in some applications, secondary packaging methods (laminate pouches) are used.

== Advantages ==
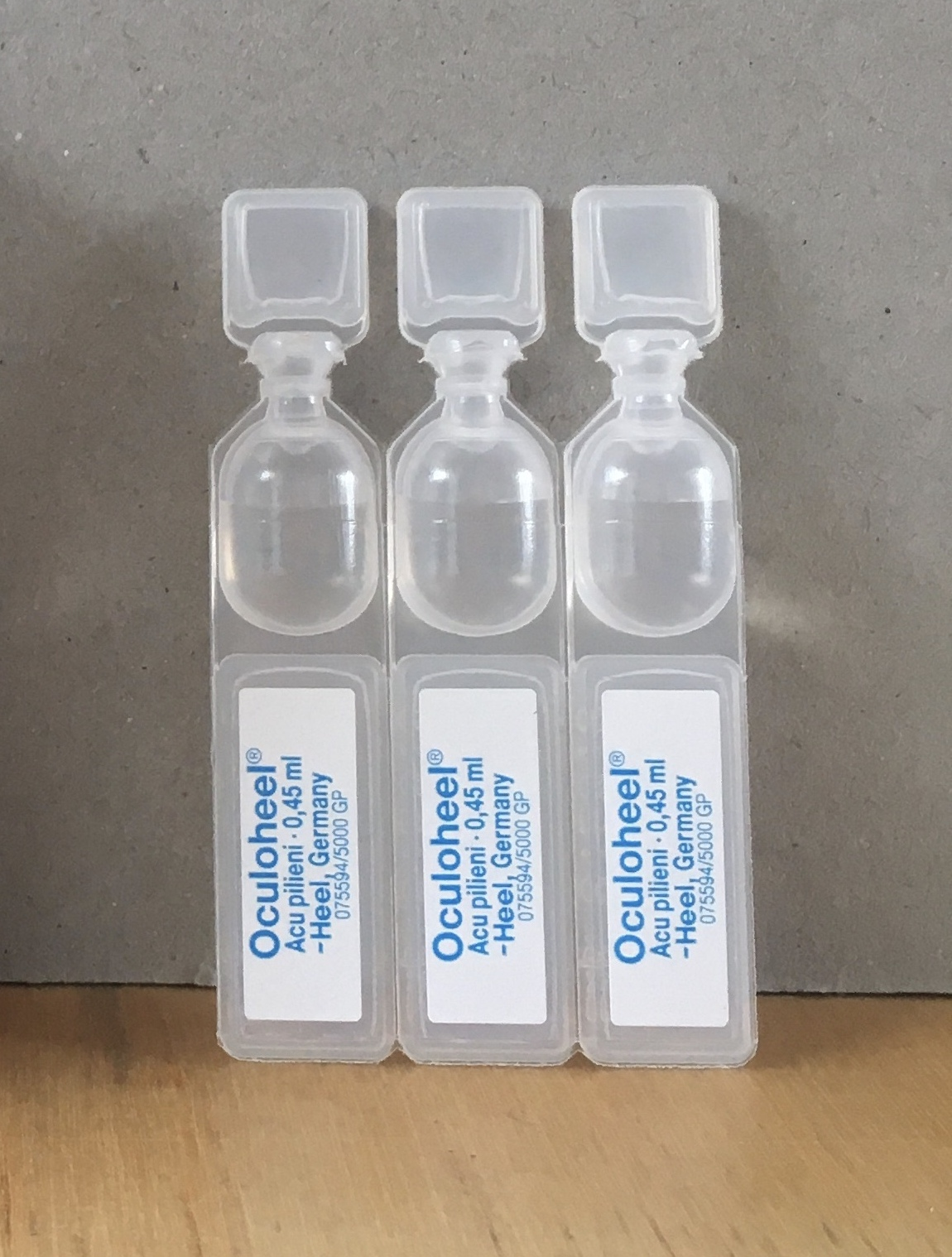
Eye drops sold in blow fill seal packaging

BFS allows many different container designs, a consistent high process quality, a high process output, and is, compared against other packaging processes, inexpensive. In addition to that, BFS containers are lighter than glass containers, and shatterproof, which eases their transport. Due to the single-dose nature of BFS containers, they are more convenient to use for patients. BFS technology assures high levels of sterility, especially compared against conventional filling, which is mainly achieved by the absence of human contact/interventions – a major source of contamination.
