= Rotary wheel blow molding systems =

Plastic extrusion machinery

Rotary wheel blow molding systems are used for the high-output production of a wide variety of plastic extrusion blow molded articles. Containers may be produced from small, single serve bottles to large containers up to 20-30 liters in volume - but wheel machines are often sized for the volume and dimensional demands of a specific container, and are typically dedicated to a narrow range of bottle sizes once built. Multiple parison machines, with high numbers of molds are capable of producing over one million bottles per day in some configurations.

== Description ==
Rotary blow molding "wheels" are targeted to the high output production of containers. They are used to produce containers from one to seven layers. View stripe and In Mold Labeling (IML) options are available in some configurations. Rotary wheels, which may contain from six to thirty molds, feature continuously extruded parisons. Revolving sets of blow molds capture the parison or parisons as they pass over the extrusion head. The revolving sets of molds are located on clamp "stations".

Rotary wheels come in different variations, including both continuous motion and indexing wheels, and vertical or horizontal variations. Wheel machines are favored for their processing ease, due to having only single (or in some cases, two) parisons, and mechanical repeatability.

In some machinery configurations, the molds take on the shape of a "pie" sector. Thus, if two or more parisons are used, each blow molded "log" has a unique length, requiring special downstream handling and trimming requirements. In other machine configurations, the molds utilize "book style" opening mechanisms, allowing multiple parisons of equal length. However, machines of this style typically have lower clamp force, limiting the available applications.

The mold close and open actuation is typically carried out through a toggle mechanism linkage that is activated during the rotational process by stationary cams. This mechanical repeatability is considered an advantage by most processors.

The method of wheel rotation is typically conducted through an electric motor with a "pinion" gear or small gear to or in mesh with a rotating "bull" gear or large gear. All utilities for blowing containers and for mold cooling are carried through the main shaft or the axle from which the wheel rotates about. These utilities include compressed air and water. Sequencing functions necessary to inflate the parison, hold the container prior to discharge and discharge are completed by mechanical actuation to pneumatic valves – resulting in a high degree of repeatability.

== Advantages & disadvantages ==
Very tight weight and dimensional tolerances can be obtained on wheel equipment, as the parison is captured on both ends. It is pinched in the preceding mold on the leading end, and positioned by the stationary flowhead die on the other end. In shuttle machinery and reciprocating screw machinery multiple parisons are extruded and are free hanging. Because there is always some variation in the parison length on these machines, bottle weight and tolerance consistencies are not as tight as on rotary wheel machinery.

Other advantages of wheel equipment include:

- Continuous extrusion
- Multi-layer coextrusion, with one to seven layers of plastic in the finished part
- In some applications, In Mold Labeling (IML) can be integrated with little or no cycle time penalty
- Parison programming capability, for optimization of wall thickness
- Reduced cycle time on light weight containers, compared to shuttle machinery. Conversely, wheel equipment may suffer cycle time penalties on thick containers
- Easily implemented view stripe capability
- Ability to achieve very high outputs from a single machine - lowest "cost per bottle" when compared to other blow molding equipment
- Higher production efficiencies than most other extrusion blow molding equipment types

Disadvantages:

- Inability to produce bottles with calibrated neck finishes
- Downstream trimming required
- Machines typically dedicated to a narrow range of sizes. Product change can be difficult, especially when downstream trimming changeovers are required.
- High initial capital investment

== Applications ==
The growth of wheel machinery in the United States was spurred by the conversion of motor oil containers from paperboard cans to plastic bottles, and the conversion of laundry detergent from powder to liquid form. Additional high volume applications have included single-serve juices and drinkable yogurt, condiments, and household cleaning supplies.

== Books, general references ==
- Soroka, W, "Fundamentals of Packaging Technology", IoPP, 2002, ISBN 1-930268-25-4
- Yam, K. L., "Encyclopedia of Packaging Technology", John Wiley & Sons, 2009, ISBN 978-0-470-08704-6
