= Blow molding =

Manufacturing process for forming and joining together hollow plastic parts

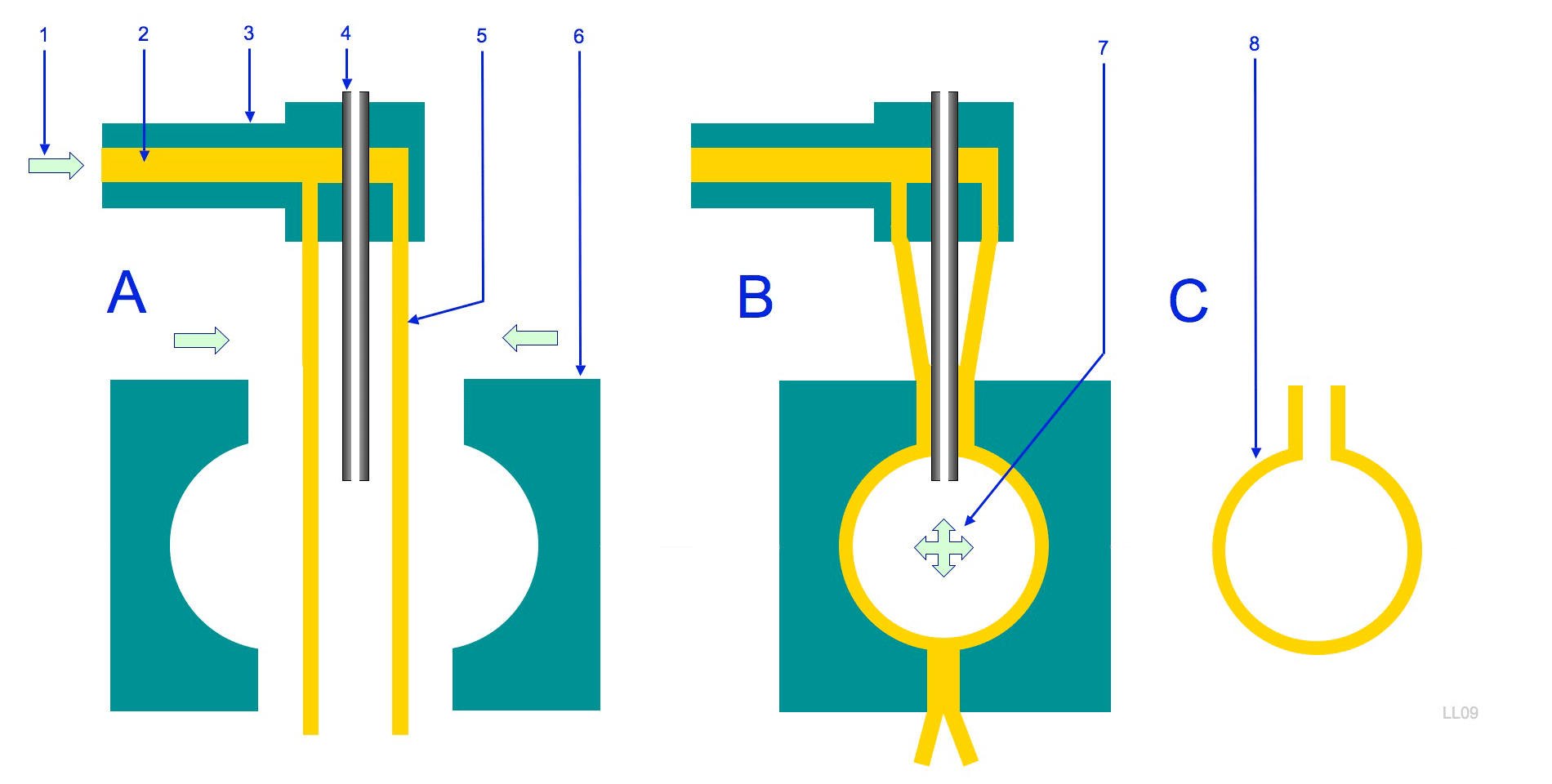
The blow molding process

Blow molding (or moulding) is a manufacturing process for forming hollow plastic parts. It is also used for forming glass bottles or other hollow shapes.

In general, there are three main types of blow molding: extrusion blow molding, injection blow molding, and injection stretch blow molding.

The blow molding process begins with softening plastic by heating a preform or parison. The parison is a tube-like piece of plastic with a hole in one end through which compressed air can enter.

The plastic workpiece is then clamped into a mold and air is blown into it. The air pressure inflates the plastic which conforms to the mold. Once the plastic has cooled and hardened the mold opens and the part is ejected. Water channels within the mold assist cooling.

== History ==
The process principle comes from the idea of glassblowing. Enoch Ferngren and William Kopitke produced a blow molding machine and sold it to Hartford Empire Company in 1938. This was the beginning of the commercial blow molding process. During the 1940s the variety and number of products were still very limited and therefore blow molding did not take off until later. Once the variety and production rates went up the number of products created soon followed.

The technical mechanisms needed to produce hollow-bodied workpieces using the blowing technique were established very early on. Because glass is very breakable, after the introduction of plastic, plastic was used to replace glass in some cases. The first mass production of plastic bottles was done in America in 1939. Germany started using this technology a little bit later but is currently one of the leading manufacturers of blow molding machines.

In the United States soft drink industry, the number of plastic containers went from zero in 1977 to ten billion pieces in 1999. Today, an even greater number of products are blown and it is expected to keep increasing.

For amorphous metals, also known as bulk metallic glasses, blow molding has been recently demonstrated under pressures and temperatures comparable to plastic blow molding.

== Typologies ==
=== Extrusion blow molding ===
Extrusion blow molding

In extrusion blow molding, plastic is melted and extruded into a hollow tube. The resulting form is a tube-like piece of plastic with a hole in one end to allow for compressed air or gas to enter—known as a parison. The parison is captured by closing it into a cooled metal mold. Air is blown into the parison, inflating it into the shape of the hollow bottle, container, or part. After the plastic has cooled, the mold is opened, and the part is ejected.

"Straight extrusion blow molding is a way of propelling material forward similar to injection molding whereby an Archimedean screw turns, feeding plastic material down a heated tube. Once the plastic is melted the screw stops rotating and linearly moves to push the melt out. With the accumulator method, an accumulator gathers melted plastic and after the previous mold has cooled and enough plastic has accumulated, a rod pushes the melted plastic and forms the parison. In this case the screw may turn continuously or intermittently. With continuous extrusion the weight of the parison drags causes itself to drag, making the calibration of the wall thickness of the parison difficult. The accumulator head or reciprocating screw methods use hydraulic systems to push the parison out quickly reducing the effect of the weight and allowing precise control over the wall thickness by adjusting the die gap with a parison programming device.

Continuous extrusion equipment includes rotary wheel blow molding systems and shuttle machinery, while intermittent extrusion machinery includes reciprocating screw machinery and accumulator head machinery.

=== Spin trimming ===
Containers such as jars often have an excess of material due to the molding process. This is trimmed off by spinning a cutting blade around the container which separates the material. The excess plastic is then recycled to create new moldings. Spin Trimmers are used on a number of materials, such as PVC, HDPE and PE+LDPE. Different types of the materials have their own physical characteristics affecting trimming. For example, moldings produced from amorphous materials are much more difficult to trim than crystalline materials. Titanium nitride-coated blades are often used rather than standard steel to increase life by a factor of 30 times.

=== Injection blow molding ===
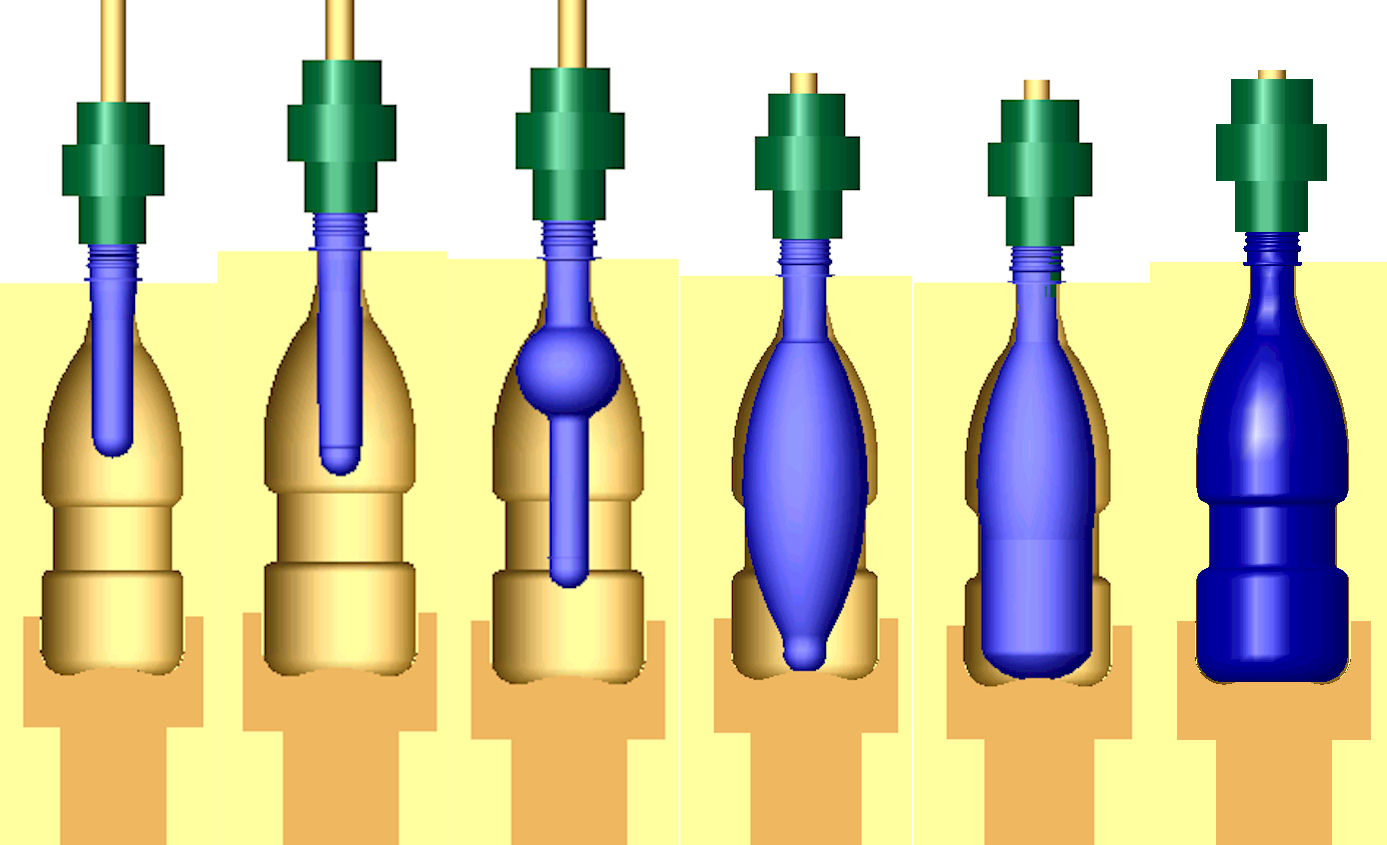
Injection blow molding a plastic bottle

The process of injection blow molding (IBM) is used for the production of hollow glass and plastic objects in large quantities. In the IBM process, the polymer is injection molded onto a core pin; then the core pin is rotated to a blow molding station to be inflated and cooled. This is the least-used of the three blow molding processes, and is typically used to make small medical and single serve bottles. The process is divided into three steps: injection, blowing and ejection.

The injection blow molding machine is based on an extruder barrel and screw assembly which melts the polymer. The molten polymer is fed into a hot runner manifold where it is injected through nozzles into a heated cavity and core pin. The cavity mold forms the external shape and is clamped around a core rod which forms the internal shape of the preform. The preform consists of a fully formed bottle/jar neck with a thick tube of polymer attached, which will form the body. similar in appearance to a test tube with a threaded neck.

The preform mold opens and the core rod is rotated and clamped into the hollow, chilled blow mold. The end of the core rod opens and allows compressed air into the preform, which inflates it to the finished article shape.

After a cooling period the blow mold opens and the core rod is rotated to the ejection position. The finished article is stripped off the core rod and as an option can be leak-tested prior to packing. The preform and blow mold can have many cavities, typically three to sixteen depending on the article size and the required output. There are three sets of core rods, which allow concurrent preform injection, blow molding and ejection.

=== Injection stretch blow molding ===
Injection stretch blow molding has two main different methods, namely single-stage and two-stage process. The single-stage process is then again broken down into 3-station and 4-station machines.

==== Single-stage ====
In the single-stage process, both preform manufacture and bottle blowing is performed in the same machine. The older 4-station method of injection, reheat, stretch blow and ejection is more costly than the 3-station machine which eliminates the reheat stage and uses latent heat in the preform, thus saving costs of energy to reheat and 25% reduction in tooling. The process explained: Imagine the molecules are small round balls, when together they have large air gaps and small surface contact, by first stretching the molecules vertically then blowing to stretch horizontally the biaxial stretching makes the molecules a cross shape. These "crosses" fit together leaving little space as more surface area is contacted thus making the material less porous and increasing barrier strength against permeation. This process also increases the strength to be ideal for filling with carbonated drinks.

==== Two-stage ====
In the two-stage injection stretch blow molding process, the plastic is first molded into a "preform" using the injection molding process. These preforms are produced with the necks of the bottles, including threads (the "finish") on one end. These preforms are packaged, and fed later (after cooling) into a reheat stretch blow molding machine. In the ISBM process, the preforms are heated (typically using infrared heaters) above their glass transition temperature, then blown using high-pressure air into bottles using metal blow molds. The preform is always stretched with a core rod as part of the process.

== See also ==
- Blow fill seal
- Gravimetric blender
- Mold-A-Rama
- Molding
- Plastic forming machine
- Hydroforming
