= Pilot hole =

Small hole drilled into a workpiece to guide a larger drill or other tool

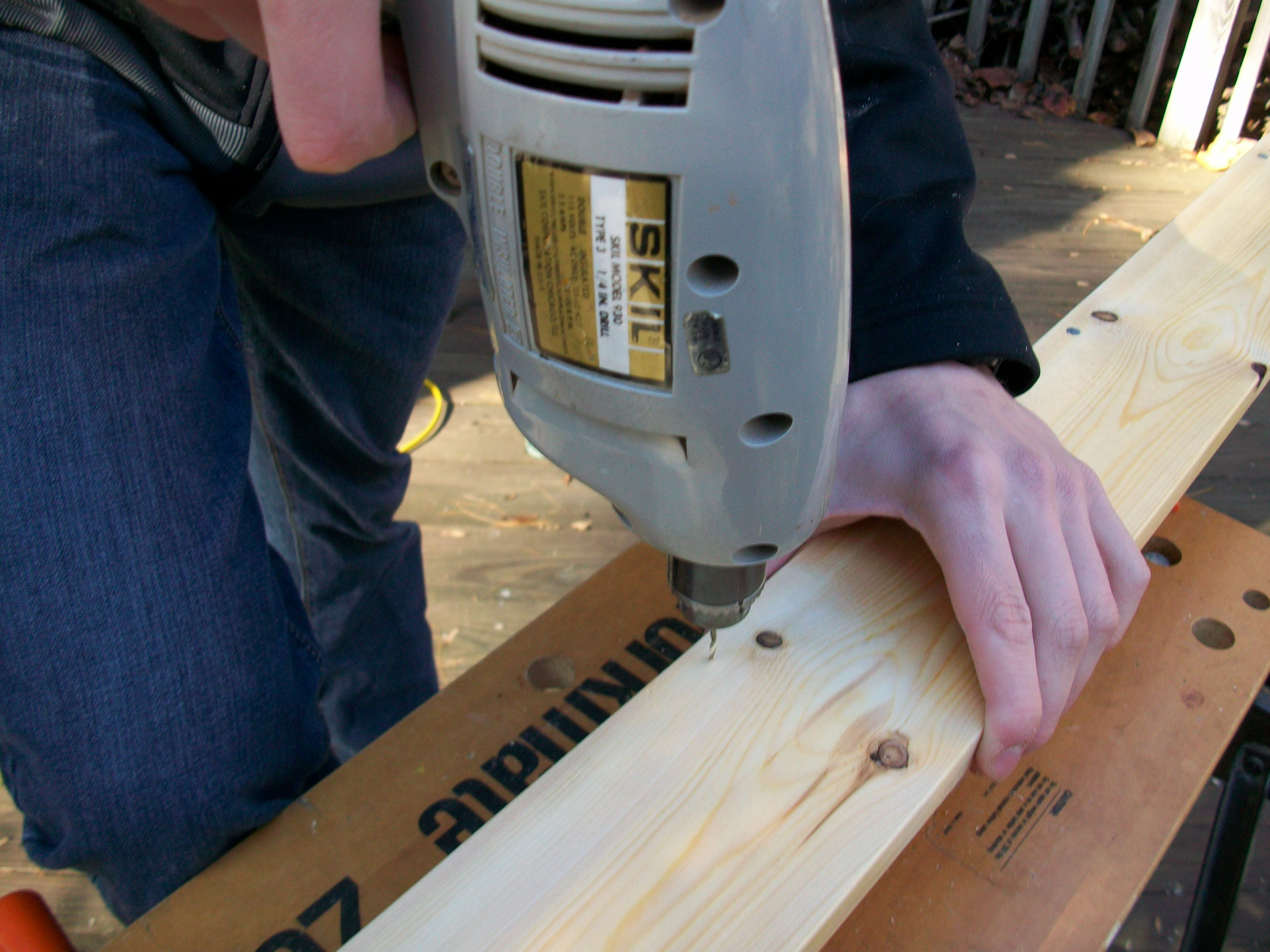
Drilling pilot holes to hammer nails

In construction, a pilot hole is a small hole drilled into a piece of construction material. Its purpose may be:

1. to guide a larger drill to the appropriate location and ease the job of the larger drill,
2. allow the insertion of another hole-making tool, such as a knockout punch, that will produce the final-sized hole, or
3. locate, guide, and provide clearance for a self-threading screw in wood or plastic to prevent damaging the material or breaking the screw.

== Pilot for large holes ==
A pilot hole may be drilled the full extent of the final hole, or may only be a portion of the final depth. The pilot drill may be a standard twist drill, another type of drill bit appropriate for the material, or, when the primary purpose is precisely locating a hole, may be made with a short, stiff center drill.

The pilot hole also reduces the power needed to turn a large drill bit, and reduces the large bit breakage risk. For twist drill bits, the pilot size is usually selected so that the chisel point of the larger drill does not need to remove any material, which reduces the chance of splitting the web of the bit. A pilot thus sized also prevents a larger drill bit from slipping on the material and guides the larger bit effectively. Very large holes may be stepped by drilling successively larger pilot holes before the final size drill is used.

On harder materials, such as most metals and many plastics, and sometimes on softer materials like wood, a center punch is used before drilling the pilot hole to ensure that the smaller pilot drill bit does not slip and that it starts at the correct location.

== Pilot holes for screws ==
Pilot holes may be used when driving a screw, typically in wood, concrete, or plastic where the screw cuts its own threads.

When a screw is driven into a material without a pilot hole, it can act as a wedge, generating outward pressure which can cause many materials to split. By drilling a small pilot hole into the material, into which a screw is then driven, less wedging takes place, thereby reducing the likelihood of the material being split.

When a screw is driven without a pilot hole, or with too small a pilot hole, the core of the screw may bind and lead to the screw being broken. The appropriate pilot hole will prevent binding while providing sufficient friction to keep the screw from loosening. For common wood screws, the pilot providing clearance for the core of the screw may be followed by a larger bit to shallower depth to provide clearance for the larger, unthreaded shank of the screw. For standard wood screws, special pilot drill bits are manufactured to produce the correct hole profile in a single operation, rather than needing several different drill bit sizes and depths.

Screws driven into concrete must have the appropriate size pilot hole, or they will either break on insertion, strip the hole, or not provide the rated holding force.

A hole drilled for tapping machine screws or bolt threads in metal or plastic may also be referred to as a pilot hole.
