= Steam infusion =

Heating process in food production

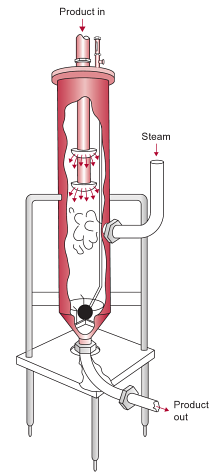
First Generation Steam Infusion

Steam Infusion is a direct-contact heating process in which steam condenses on the surface of a pumpable food product. Its primary use is for the gentle and rapid heating of a variety of food ingredients and products including milk, cream, soymilk, ketchup, soups and sauces.

Unlike steam injection and traditional vesselled steam heating; the steam infusion process surrounds the liquid food product with steam as opposed to passing steam through the liquid.

Steam Infusion allows food product to be cooked, mixed and pumped within a single unit, often removing the need for multiple stages of processing.

== History ==
Steam infusion was first used in pasteurization and has since been developed for further liquid heating applications.

=== First generation ===
In the 1960s APV PLC launched the first steam infusion system under the Palarisator brand name. This involves a 2-stage process for steam infusion whereby the liquid is cascaded into a large pressurized steam chamber and is sterilized when falling as film or droplets through the chamber. The liquid is then condensed at the chilled bottom of the chamber. Illustrated in the image on the right hand side of the page.

=== Second generation ===
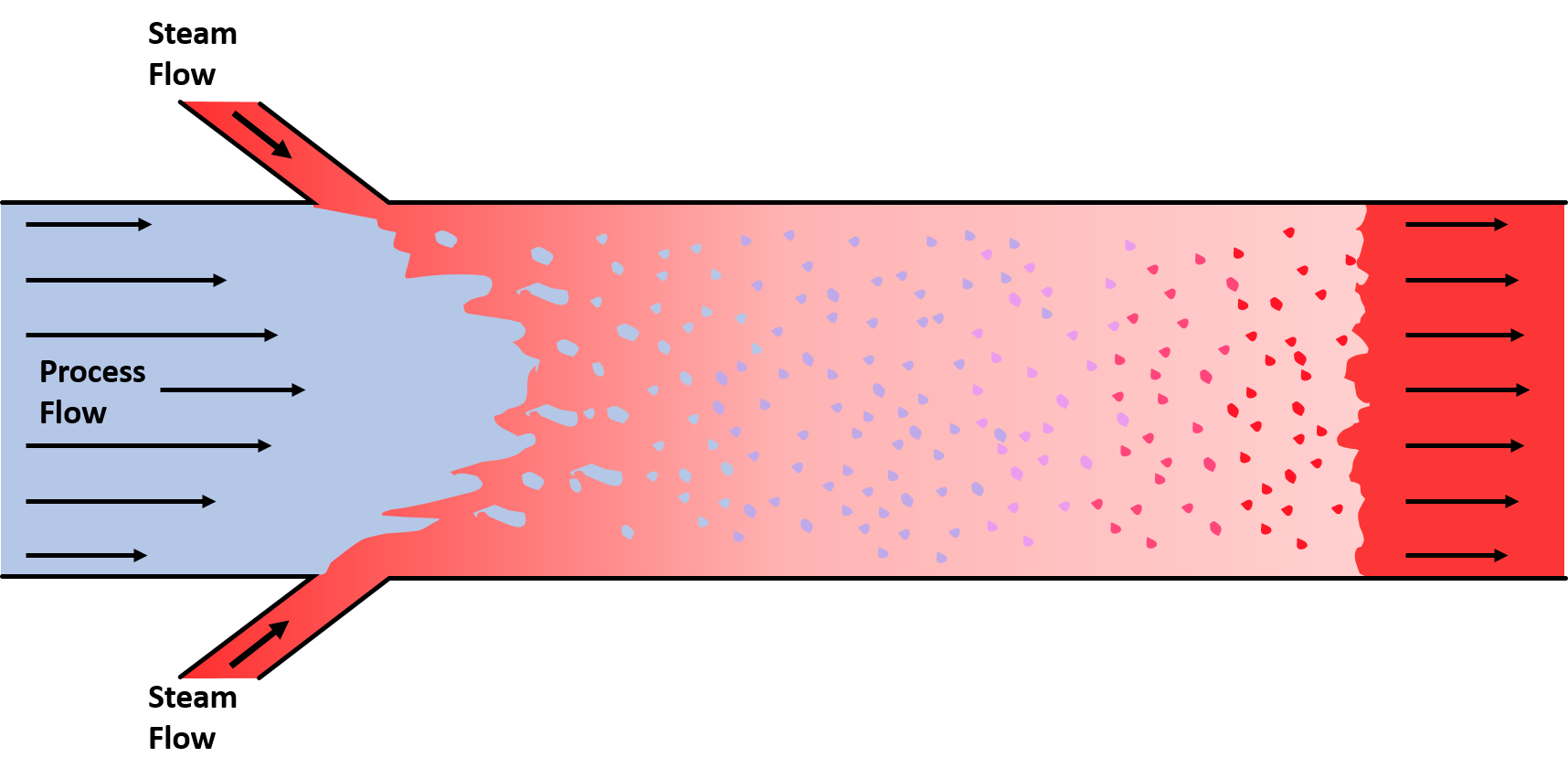
The PDX steam cooker

The Steam Infusion process was first developed in 2000 by Pursuit Dynamics PLC as a method for marine propulsion. The process has since been developed to be used for applications in brewing, food and beverages, public health and safety, bioenergy, industrial licensing, and waste treatment worldwide. On the right a diagram shows how the process creates an environment of vaporised product surrounded by high energy steam. The supersonic steam flow entrains and vaporises the process flow to form a multiphase flow, which heats the suspended particles by surface conduction and condensation. The condensation of the steam causes the process flow to return to a liquid state. This causes rapid and uniform heating over the unit making it applicable to industrial cooking processes. This process has been used in industry, predominantly in soup and sauces applications. Its possible benefits include reduced cooking times, easier cleaning with no burn-on, ingredient reduction and energy savings.

The Pursuit Dynamics PLC food and beverage business was sold to Olympus Automation Ltd. in April 2013.

In 2013, Pursuit Dynamics PLC, following significant financial losses, was acquired by Gaming Realms plc, in a reverse merger transaction.

== Applications ==
=== Pasteurization ===
Steam infusion can be used to pasteurize a variety of dairy products. For ultra pasteurization, also known as ultrahigh-temperature (UHT) pasteurization, the milk is heated to temperatures in the order of 140 °C. During steam infusion, milk is brought into contact with steam at 140 °C for one or two seconds. The heating is instantaneous, and the milk is cooled rapidly by evaporative cooling exposure to a slight vacuum, removing any water added to the milk by condensation of the steam.

=== Cooking ===
Steam infusion is used in cooking applications on fluid based products. The heat addition on particulate level in a low pressure environment makes steam infusion cooking especially applicable to soups and sauces where particle integrity is important. Steam Infusion has shown the potential to improve the nutritional content of food and is being researched by the University of Lincoln
