= Blokker =

Blokker may refer to:

- Blokker, Netherlands, a town in the Netherlands
- Blokker (store), a Dutch chain store
- Blokker Holding, a Dutch company

== People with the surname ==
- IJf Blokker (1930–2026), Dutch musician and television actor and presenter
- Jaap Blokker (1942–2011), Dutch businessman and chief executive
- Jan Blokker (1927–2010), Dutch journalist

Jan Andries Blokker Sr. (27 May 1927 – 6 July 2010) was a Dutch journalist, columnist, publicist, writer,[1] and amateur historian
