= Toys "R" Us (disambiguation) =

Toys "R" Us is an American retailer.

Toys "R" Us may also refer to:

== Businesses ==
- Toys "R" Us Canada, a division operated by Putman Investments, under license from Ad Populum
- Toys "R" Us UK, a division operated by WHP Global, under license from Tru Kids
- Toys "R" Us Asia, a division mostly operated by Fung Retailing, under license from Tru Kids
- Toys "R" Us Europe, a division operated by Prenatal Retail Group, under license from Tru Kids
- Toys "R" Us Mexico, a division operated by WHP Global and El Puerto de Liverpool, under license from Tru Kids
- Toys "R" Us Australia, a division operated by Directed Electronics Australia, under license from Tru Kids
- Toys "R" Us Middle East and Africa, a division operated by numerous companies, under license from Tru Kids

== Other uses ==
- Toys "R" Us, Inc. v. Step Two, S.A, a 2003 lawsuit
- Tru Kids, a company formed in 2019 to manage the Toys "R" Us intellectual property
