= Toys "R" Us Europe =

Toy shop chain

Toys "R" Us Europe is a toy chain operating across Spain and Portugal by the Prenatal Retail Group and Turkey by the Agnaris Retail Joint Stock Company, with the brand being used under license by Tru Kids. It previously operated in many other parts of Europe.

== History ==
=== Spain and Portugal (1991–present) ===
Toys "R" Us launched in Spain in 1991, and Portugal in 1993. In August 2018, "Toys "R" Us Iberia", consisting of stores in Spain and Portugal, was sold to Green Swan. In April 2022, Toys "R" Us Iberia filed for bankruptcy. In July 2022, Italian business Prenatal Retail Group purchased Toys "R" Us Iberia under a long-term agreement with the brand owners WHP Global, and continue operating the stores and website under the brand.

=== Turkey (1996–2010; 2025-present) ===
In 1996, Uluslararası Çocuk Çarşıları A.Ş. entered into a licensing agreement to operate its own toy stores under the Toys "R" Us brand in Turkey through a non-profit payment system. Unlike most franchisees, Toys "R" Us made no financial or operational contributions to the Turkish stores, which Uluslararası Çocuk Çarşıları solely handled.

In March 2008, Uluslararası Çocuk Çarşıları announced that they had terminated the licensing agreement and rebranded the 35 stores under its own brand, Toyiki. The company's vice president, Murat Beyazıt, said the licensing agreement with Toys "R" Us had become too expensive to continue, and had costed them $10 million in 12 years. The company's separation process began as early as 2005. In July 2010, Toyiki closed its 32 remaining stores in exchange for debts following its struggles with bankruptcy proceedings and incurred $20 million in debt.

In September 2025, WHP Global announced that the Toys "R" Us brand would return to Turkey. Under a licensing agreement with Agnaris Retail Joint Stock Company, a new store opened in Terminal Kadıköy in Istanbul in December that year.

== Defunct locations ==
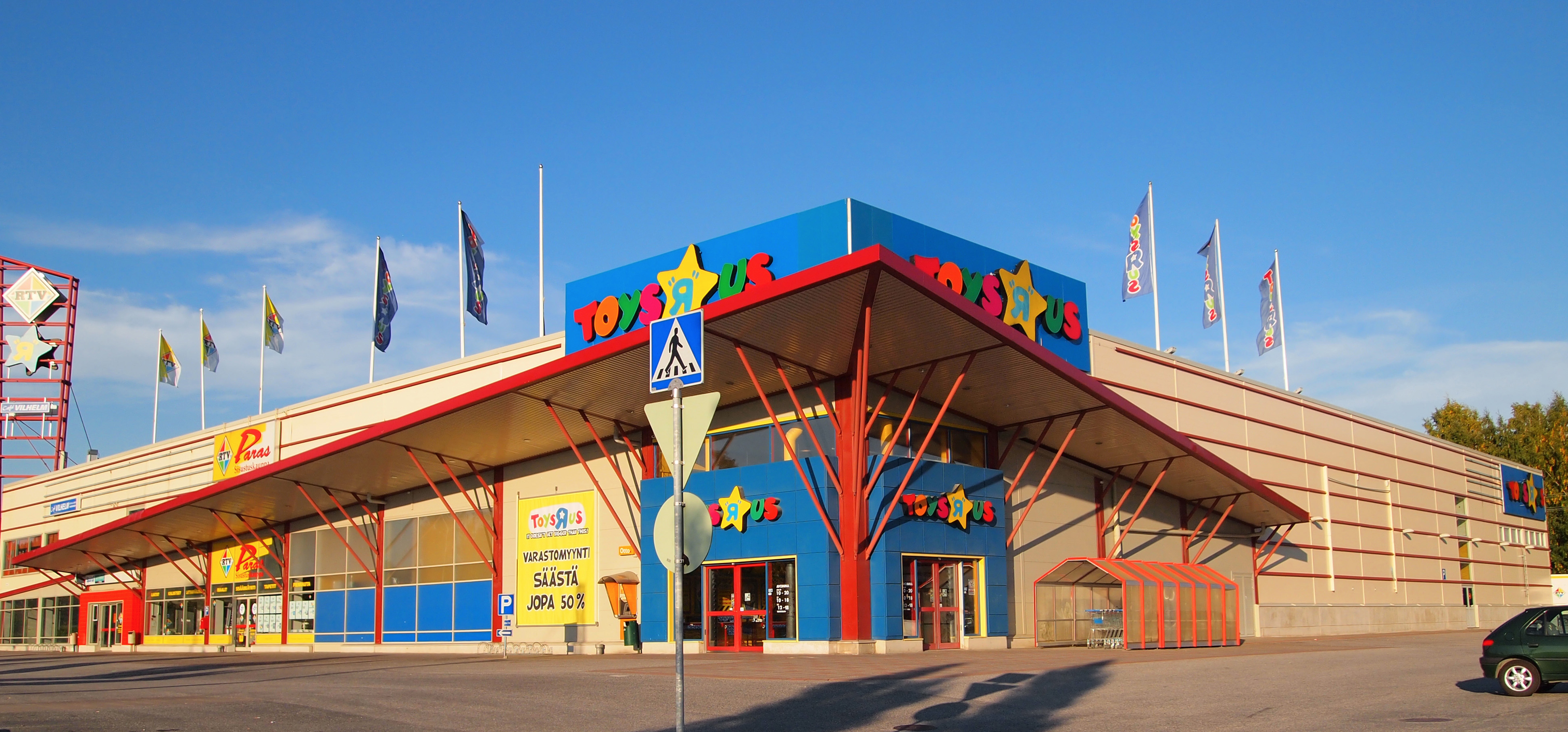
Toys "R" Us in Jyväskylä, Finland, in 2013

=== Denmark, Finland, Iceland, Norway, and Sweden (1994–2019) ===
In October 1994, Toys "R" Us launched in Scandinavia. In Denmark, Finland, Iceland, Norway, and Sweden, Toys "R" Us stores were independently operated by Top-Toy under license. Because of this, these respective stores were not affected by the bankruptcy of Toys "R" Us' parent company. However, Top Toy would file for bankruptcy itself on December 30, 2018, due to poor holiday sales, with all Toys "R" Us stores closing by January 10, 2019.

=== France (1989–2019) ===
Toys "R" Us France launched in 1989. In July 2018, Toys "R" Us France went into receivership in order to look for a buyer. The franchise including 44 of the stores was purchased by French company Jellej Jouets in October 2018. In April 2019, they sold the stores over to Luderix International, the owners of rival chain PicWic. The merger was soon completed, and by July 2019 all Toys "R" Us and PicWic stores were rebranded as PicWicToys.

Due to profit losses caused by the COVID-19 pandemic, the chain closed several of its stores in 2020, and soon went into receivership in May 2022. In July 2022, Smyths, who already owned the ex-Toys "R" Us stores in German-speaking areas, purchased PicWicToys.

=== Germany, Austria and Switzerland (1987–2018) ===
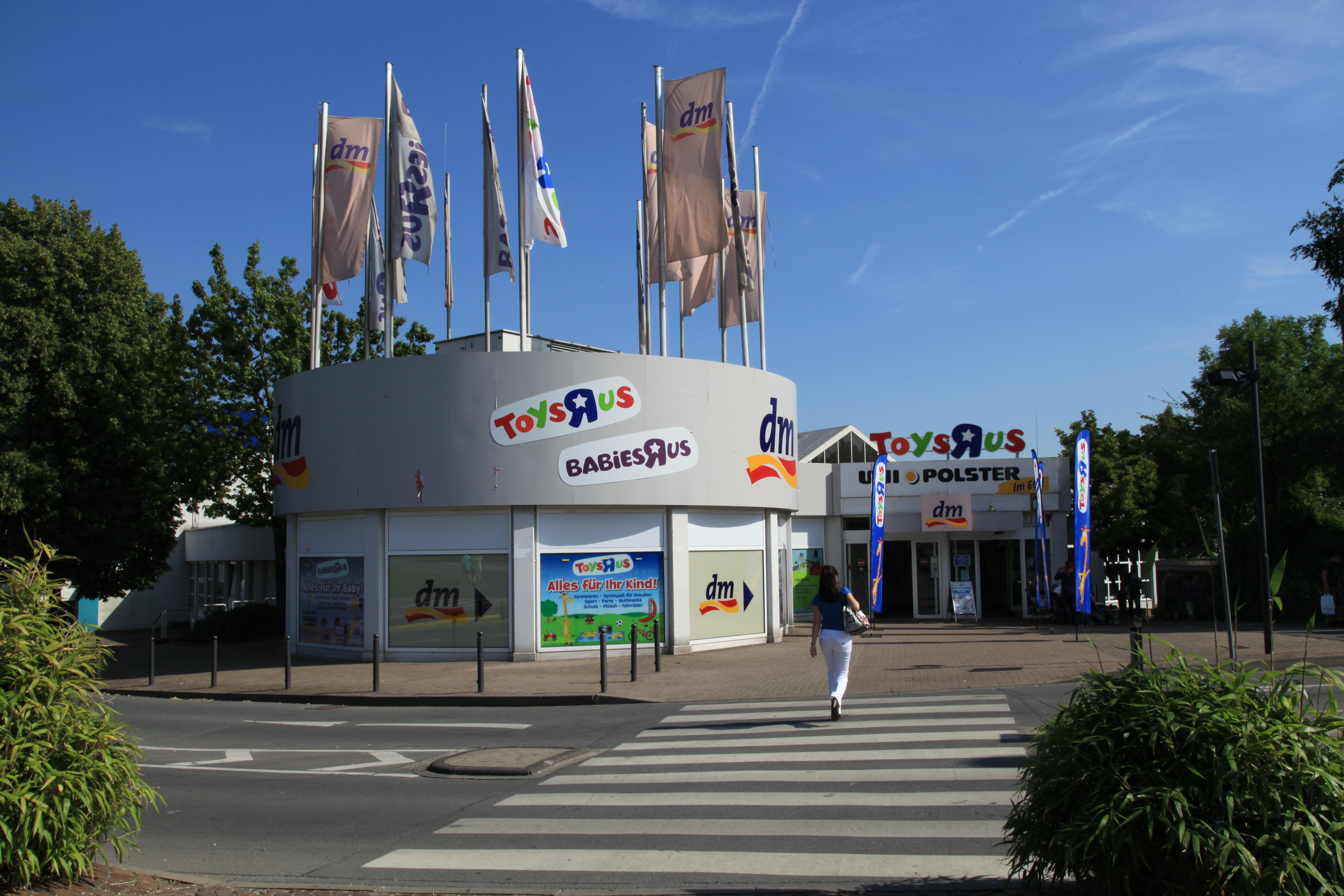
Toys "R" Us in Bochum, Germany in 2012

Toys "R" Us was founded in Germany in 1987. Stores in Germany, Austria and Switzerland were operated by Toys "R" Us AG. In April 2018, it was announced that Smyths would acquire Toys "R" Us AG, although they were still pending by July. The deal was completed in January 2019, and all stores were rebranded as Smyths shortly afterward.

=== Ireland (2015–2016) ===
In April 2015, Toys "R" Us announced it would expand to the Irish market and open six stores by the end of the year. The stores were operated by the franchisee who owned the UK operations. In the end, only two stores opened up - the first in Limerick, the other in Blanchardstown.

In February 2016, after failing to compete with rivals such as Smyths, Toys "R" Us announced it had ended its Irish franchisee agreement, and both stores closed with immediate effect.

=== Netherlands (1993–2009) ===
Toys "R" Us was launched in the Netherlands in 1993. The chain was never commercially successful in the country due to the unpopularity of big box store formats, with average consumers preferring to visiting smaller stores to buy toys.

Between 1996 and 1997, Blokker, the owners of rival chain Intertoys, made attempts to purchase out the Dutch division, but were denied permission due to competition costs. Blokker would however, take a 20% share in the business, while a private equity firm, De Hoge Dennen Capital, would take over operations. Eventually, Toys "R" Us would lend over the stores under a franchisee deal to Speelhoorn B.V., another Dutch business.

On March 2, 2009, Toys "R" Us and Speelhoorn announced that they would end their franchisee agreement and that the Toys "R" Us brand would exit out of the Netherlands. The 17 stores formerly under the name were rebranded as Toys XL.

=== Poland (2011–2020s) ===
Toys "R" Us entered the Polish market in October 2011, with the first store opening in Blue City, Warsaw. In October 2014, they began online operations.

The Polish operations remained unaffected during the bankruptcy, and by 2017, 16 stores were operating. Eventually, the Polish chain began to close stores to cover the cost of debts and losses affected from the COVID-19 pandemic, closing seven of them in 2021. In February 2022, the store's website was shuttered and the remaining stores were closed throughout the year. A final location at the Pasaż Łódzki shopping centre in Łódź, Poland remain open as a sole-survivor, but has since closed.
