= Directorate-General for Competition =

European Union department

Agency overview
- Jurisdiction: European Union
- Headquarters: Brussels, Belgium
- Employees: 888 (2025)
- Agency executives: Teresa Ribera, Executive Vice-President; Linsey McCallum, (ACTING) Director-General and Deputy Director-General; Guillaume Loriot, Deputy Director-General; Anthony Whelan, Deputy Director-General
- Website: https://commission.europa.eu/about/departments-and-executive-agencies/competition_en

The Directorate-General for Competition (DG Competition, or internal Commission letter code COMP or numerical code DG 04) is a Directorate-General of the European Commission, located in Brussels. The DG Competition employs around 900 officials. It is responsible for establishing and implementing competition policy for the European Union. It enforces Articles 101-106 of the Treaty on the Functioning of the EU (TFEU) "in cooperation with national competition authorities." DG Competition is considered to be one of the most sophisticated antitrust enforcers in the world, alongside the United States Federal Trade Commission and the Antitrust Division of the Department of Justice. However, it operates with more independence than either American counterpart, being "structurally more insulated from political and lobbying pressures." Between 1990 and 2025, DG Competition imposed a total of 30 billion euros in fines for cartel infringements after court adjustments.

== History ==
=== 20th century ===
In 1989, with the passing of Merger Regulation (4064/1989), DG Competition gained the ability to investigate mergers.

In 1997, DG Competition clashed with the United States Department of Justice over the Boeing–McDonnell Douglas merger. DG Competition did not approve the deal until concessions were made.

=== 21st century ===
==== 2000s ====
In June 2000, DG Competition blocked MCI Worldcom's US$115 billion acquisition of Sprint Corporation in conjunction with the Department of Justice. It would have been the biggest deal of its kind ever up to that point.

In July 2001, DG Competition prohibited GE from acquiring Honeywell for US$42 billion due to dominant positions in several markets including jet engines. Although they worked together during the investigation, their opinion once again diverged with the DOJ.

In January 2003, after the 2002 annulment by the Court of First Instance of a 2001 decision, the commission cleared Tetra Laval's acquisition of Sidel.

In 2003, DG Competition created a chief economist position directly under the director general to lead a team of 20 economists. Between 2003 and 2004, merger units for multiple sectors were integrated into antitrust teams.

In June 2007, the commission prohibited Ryanair's takeover of Aer Lingus, a situation which would repeat itself in 2013.

In June 2008, a settlement procedure was introduced for cartels with the aim of decreasing the duration and costs of investigations. In November, Asahi, Pilkington, Saint-Gobain and Soliver were fined a record 1.3 billion euros for forming a car glass cartel. The General Court would later reduce Pilkington and Saint-Gobain's fines.

In May 2009, Intel was fined 1.06 billion euros for anticompetitive practices in the central processing unit market. The fine was overturned in court, and the commission proceeded to re-impose a downsized fine on the company.

DG Competition's fines on corporations climbed from 3.4 billion euros between 2000 and 2004 to 9.4 billion euros between 2005 and 2009. The average fine increased from less than 20 million euros by more than a factor of 15 from 2000 to 2008.

==== 2010s ====
From 2010 to 2019, the commission imposed a total of 28.5 billion euros in cartel, antitrust, and merger fines. During the same period, the DG Competition blocked nine out of 3,000 reviewed mergers.

The following table lists the highest cartel fines (exceeding 1 billion euros) throughout the decade:

Year	Institutions fined	Total fine (Euro)	Market	Fined parties	Exempted parties	References
2012	7	1.47 billion	Cathode ray tube	LG Electronics, Philips, Samsung SDI, Panasonic, Toshiba, MTPD (a Panasonic subsidiary), Technicolor (formerly Thomson)	Chunghwa	
2013	6	1.49 billion	Derivative (finance)	Deutsche Bank, RBS, Société Générale, Citigroup, JPMorgan, RP Martin	Barclays, UBS	
2016	4	2.9 billion	Truck	Daimler, Volvo/Renault, Iveco, DAF	MAN SE	
2019	5	1.07 billion	Foreign exchange spot	Barclays, RBS, Citigroup, JPMorgan, MUFG	UBS	

In 2013, Aegean Airlines's rejected 2011 acquisition was approved due to Olympic Air's imminently anticipated financial decline due to Greece's economic conditions.

In May 2016, the commission prohibited Hutchison's 10.3 billion pound acquisition of O2. In July, four European truck manufacturers agreed to pay the commission a record 2.9 billion euros for "price increases, timing for the introduction of new emissions technologies and the passing on to customers of the costs for the emissions technologies." Daimler was fined the most, at 1 billion euros. MAN SE was exempted for revealing the cartel to authorities. Scania did not settle, and was fined a year later after further investigation by DG Competition. Its fine was higher than those of Volvo/Renault, Iveco or DAF. In August, the commission deemed that Ireland's 13 billion euros in tax benefits to Apple were illegal under EU law and had to be recovered.

In March 2017, the commission blocked a 21 billion pound merger between the European stock exchange operators Deutsche Börse and London Stock Exchange. In June, Google was fined 2.42 billion euros for illegally advantaging Google Shopping through its search engine.

In July 2018, the commission fined Google a record 4.34 billion euros for antitrust violations. These activities included manufacturer software pre-installation requirements, exclusive pre-installation payments, and unapproved Android fork prevention.

In February 2019, the commission prohibited Germany's Siemens from acquiring France's Alstom. The decision drew criticism from France's Economy Minister Bruno Le Maire.

==== 2020s ====
In September 2022, DG Competition prohibited genomics company Illumina from acquiring healthcare company Grail. Illumina's remedies were deemed insufficient and the company prematurely confirmed the acquisition before the EU's approval. The FTC also blocked the acquisition, leading Illumina to divest in 2023. The EU Court of Justice later ruled that the commission overstepped.

In 2023, Commissioner Margrethe Vestager drew criticism for selecting Professor Fiona Scott Morton of Yale University, former chief economist of the Obama Administration, as Chief Competition Economist of DG Competition. Both her American nationality and consulting work for Big Tech came under fire by EU leaders, leading her to turn down the position.

In March 2024, Apple was fined 1.8 billion euros for "anti-steering provisions" in relation to music subscriptions on the App Store. Apple criticized the decision for benefiting Spotify, which held a majority market share in Europe.

Following is a table categorizing the EU's merger interventions from December 2019 to October 2024:

Transaction Count	Status	Stage	Conditions
41	Approved	Phase 1 investigation	with remedies
17	Approved	Phase 2 investigation	with remedies
3	Approved	Phase 2 investigation	without remedies
7	Abandoned	during review	without Statement of Objections
5	Abandoned	during review	with Statement of Objections
3	Prohibited		

In September 2025, the commission fined Google 2.95 billion euros for "favouring its own online display advertising technology services."

== Official merger prohibitions ==
For acquisitions, the acquiring party is in bold.

#	Year	Firms	Headquarters locations	Type	Entity name	Market	Reference
1	1991	**Aerospatiale-Alenia**	France	Acquisition		Regional turbo-prop aircraft	
1	1991	de Havilland	Canada	Acquisition		Regional turbo-prop aircraft	
2	1994	Bertelsmann	Germany	Joint venture	MSG Media Service	Television, Other communication services	
2	1994	Kirch	Germany	Joint venture	MSG Media Service	Television, Other communication services	
2	1994	Deutsche Telekom	Germany	Joint venture	MSG Media Service	Television, Other communication services	
3	1995	Norsk Telekom	Norway	Joint venture	Nordic Satellite Distribution	Satellite transmission services, Distribution services	
3	1995	TeleDanmark	Denmark	Joint venture	Nordic Satellite Distribution	Satellite transmission services, Distribution services	
3	1995	Kinnevik	Sweden	Joint venture	Nordic Satellite Distribution	Satellite transmission services, Distribution services	
4	1995	RTL4	Luxembourg	Joint venture	Holland Media Group	TV advertising and production	
4	1995	Veronica	Netherlands	Joint venture	Holland Media Group	TV advertising and production	
4	1995	Endemol	Netherlands	Joint venture	Holland Media Group	TV advertising and production	
5	1996	Gencor	South Africa	Merger	Impala Platinum, Lonrho Platinum Division	Platinum group	
5	1996	Lonrho	Great Britain	Merger	Impala Platinum, Lonrho Platinum Division	Platinum group	
6	1996	**Kesko**	Finland	Acquisition		Daily consumer goods	
6	1996	Tuko	Finland	Acquisition		Daily consumer goods	
7	1996	Société Européenne des Produits Réfractaires	France	Joint venture		Silicon carbide	
7	1996	Elektroschmelzwerk Kempten GmbH	Germany	Joint venture		Silicon carbide	
7	1996	NOM	Netherlands	Joint venture		Silicon carbide	
8	1997	**Blokker**	Netherlands	Acquisition		Toys	
8	1997	Toys "R" Us	United States	Acquisition		Toys	
9	1997	Bertelsmann AG	Germany	Merger	Premiere Digital	Digital pay television	
9	1997	Kirch Group	Germany	Merger	Premiere Digital	Digital pay television	
10	1998	Deutsche Telekom	Germany	Merger	BetaResearch	Encryption technology	
10	1998	BetaTechnik	Germany	Merger	BetaResearch	Encryption technology	
11	1999	**Airtours**	Great Britain	Acquisition		Leisure travel services	
11	1999	First Choice	Great Britain	Acquisition		Leisure travel services	
12	2000	**Scania**	Sweden	Acquisition		Heavy trucks, Buses, Touring coaches	
12	2000	Volvo	Sweden	Acquisition		Heavy trucks, Buses, Touring coaches	
13	2000	MCI Worldcom	United States	Merger		Internet	
13	2000	Sprint	United States	Merger		Internet	
14	2001	**General Electric**	United States	Acquisition		Aero-engines, Avionics	
14	2001	Honeywell	United States	Acquisition		Aero-engines, Avionics	
15	2001	**Tetra Laval**	Netherlands	Acquisition		SBM machines	
15	2001	Sidel	France	Acquisition		SBM machines	
16	2001	**Schneider Electric**	France	Acquisition		Electrical equipment	
16	2001	Legrand	France	Acquisition		Electrical equipment	
17	2004	**ENI**	Italy	Acquisition		Electricity, Gas	
17	2004	**EDP**	Portugal	Acquisition		Electricity, Gas	
17	2004	GDP	Portugal	Acquisition		Electricity, Gas	
18	2007	**Ryanair**	Ireland	Acquisition		Short-haul flights	
18	2007	Aer Lingus	Ireland	Acquisition		Short-haul flights	
19	2011	Olympic Air	Greece	Merger		Air transport	
19	2011	Aegean Airlines	Greece	Merger		Air transport	
20	2013	**UPS**	United States	Acquisition		Express delivery of small packages	
20	2013	TNT Express	Netherlands	Acquisition		Express delivery of small packages	
21	2013	**Ryanair**	Ireland	Acquisition		Short-haul flights	
21	2013	Aer Lingus	Ireland	Acquisition		Short-haul flights	
22	2016	**Hutchison 3G**	Great Britain	Acquisition		Mobile network	
22	2016	O2 UK	Great Britain	Acquisition		Mobile network	
23	2017	Deutsche Börse	Germany	Merger		Clearing of fixed income instruments	
23	2017	London Stock Exchange	Great Britain	Merger		Clearing of fixed income instruments	
24	2019	**Siemens**	Germany	Acquisition		Railway and metro signalling systems, Rolling stock	
24	2019	Alstom	France	Acquisition		Railway and metro signalling systems, Rolling stock	
25	2019	**Wieland-Werke**	Germany	Acquisition		Rolled copper	
25	2019	Aurubis	Germany	Acquisition		Rolled copper	
26	2019	Thyssenkrupp	Germany	Joint Venture		Steel	
26	2019	Tata Steel	India	Joint Venture		Steel	
27	2022	**Hyundai Heavy Industries Holdings**	South Korea	Acquisition		Large liquefied gas carriers	
27	2022	Daewoo Shipbuilding	South Korea	Acquisition		Large liquefied gas carriers	
28	2022	**Illumina**	United States	Acquisition		Early cancer detection tests	
28	2022	GRAIL	United States	Acquisition		Early cancer detection tests	
29	2023	**Booking**	United States	Acquisition		Hotel online travel agencies	
29	2023	eTraveli	Sweden	Acquisition		Hotel online travel agencies	

== See also ==
- Antitrust cases against Google by the European Union
- Apple's EU tax dispute
- European Commissioner for Competition
- European Union competition law
- European Union v. Microsoft
