= Cermex =

French packaging manufacturer

CERMEX
- Company type: SAS
- Industry: Shrink-wrapper / Case-Packer / Palletizer
- Founded: 1974
- Headquarters: Corcelles-lès-Cîteaux, France
- Revenue: Euro 130 million
- Number of employees: 800
- Parent: Sidel groupe Tetra Laval
- Divisions: Cermex UK, Cermex Inc, Cermex Beijing, Cermex SAP, Cermex Mexicana, Cermex India

Cermex is a company that manufactures case packing, shrink-wrapping and palletizing machinery. Cermex supplies engineering and equipment to automate end of line packaging, from the packed product to the loaded pallet. Cermex supports global engineering and equipment for the packaging of various and diverse products, from individual product packaging to completing finished pallets for shipment.

The French company is present on an international scale with 70% of its turnover from exports. It employs 800 people in 5 production sites and several international subsidiaries. Cermex is also present on all continents through a wide network of agents. Machines supplied by Cermex are designed and manufactured in one of its 5 production sites: Corcelles-les-Citeaux (21) for Case Packing, Lisieux (14) for Shrink Wrapping, St. Laurent-sur-Sevre (85) for Palletizing, Beijing (China) for the assembly of three standard machines and subsets of machines for the domestic market with an extension on the South-East Asia and for the last India for Case Packing for the Indian market.

Since 1996, Cermex has been the overwrapping and palletizing division of the Sidel Group, part of the Swedish holding Tetra Laval, a global company that provides packaging for food and beverage products including water, soft drinks, milk, juice, sauces, edible oils, beer and alcoholic beverages.

== History ==
Cermex was created in 1974 in Corcelles-lès-Cîteaux, France. By 1982 it was a leader in the corrugated case packaging market in France. 1985 introduced the creation of the first international subsidiary: Cermex UK. 1996 saw the integration into the Sidel group then in 1998 the merger with Ouest Conditionnement, another subsidiary of Sidel specialized in shrink-wrapping.

It accentuated its development policy with the opening of the second international subsidiary, in the United States, in 1999, the opening of an office for Asia in Thailand in 2003, then the establishment of sales subsidiaries in Mexico, Russia and Brazil and the creation in China of an industrial subsidiary in 2008. The turnover doubled between 1991 and 1997, reaching 40 million euros, and doubled again between 1997 and 2007, 80 million euros.

In 2012, Cermex acquired Newtec Case Palletizing in Saint-Laurent-sur-Sevre (85) to strengthen its range of palletizing solutions.

- 1974 - Creation of Cermex
- 1985 - First international subsidiary: CERMEX UK
- 1996 - Integration of Cermex in the Sidel group
- 1999 - Opening of a subsidiary in the US: CERMEX Inc
- 2003 - Opening of an office in Thailand for South-East Asia and Australia: Cermex Asia Pacific
- 2007 - New sales office in China
- 2008 - Opening of a subsidiary in China
- 2009 - New sales and services subsidiary in Thailand
- 2011 - Opening of Sales & Services subsidiaries in India and Mexico
- 2012 – Acquisition of Newtec Case Palletizing in Saint-Laurent-Sur-Sèvre (85)
- 2012 – Opening of a subsidiary in India

== Target Markets ==
Cermex designs machines mainly for seven markets: food, alcoholic beverages, non-alcoholic beverages, personal care, home care, health care and paper. Cermex offers solutions for case packing, shrink-wrapping then palletizing products such as cartons, glass or plastic bottles, bags or stand-up pouches, etc.

== Cermex Solutions ==
Capable of handling all types of primary and secondary packaging, Cermex offers a comprehensive range of solutions with single-function or multi-function machines, depending on the layout constraints and speed requirements.

== Machine Range ==
- Product dividing and collating systems
- Shrink-wrapping: with or without seal for promotional packs, multipacks or transit packs
- Solutions for RSC: case erectors, case gluers, top/side/bottom loading case packers
- Solutions for wrap around blanks: tray erectors, lid fitters, tray packers, wrap around case packers, combined tray packing/lid fitting machines, shelf-ready packaging packers, continuous VersaWrap™ packers
- Robots: numerical-axis gantry packers, Delta robots, 6-axis polyarticulated robots
- Palletizing systems: layer by layer, on 4 axes, gantry or robotic
- Compact combined case packing and palletizing units

== Innovation ==
Cermex invests 10% of its turnover in industrializing new processes capable of handling the entire end of line, from the product, in its primary packaging, to the finished pallet. The company produces 450 machines per year and has an installed base of 12,000 machines, in particular within international groups. From its creation, Cermex set up an extensive design office contributing to the design and continuous improvement of the solutions proposed. Ten to 12 innovations and 15-20 patents are published per year (new developments, modules or machines)

== Sources ==
- Cermex acquires Newtec Case Palletizing. Packaging World Magazine.
- Cermex expands with Newtec Case Palletizing buy-out. Packaging News Magazine.
- Veuve Clicquot turns to Cermex to pack latest presentation box. Packaging News Magazine.
- Cermex launches VersaWrap case packer. Packaging News Magazine.
