= Blokker (store) =

Dutch retailer

- Logo used from 2002 to 2016, and since 2025.
- Industry: Retail
- Founded: 25 April 1896
- Founder: Jacob Blokker
- Defunct: November 13, 2024
- Headquarters: Amsterdam, Netherlands
- Number of locations: 394 stores (2024)
- Area served: The Netherlands, Belgium
- Number of employees: 3500 employees (2024)
- Parent: Blokker New B.V. (2025-present
- Website: www.blokker.nl

Blokker is a Dutch retail chain specializing in household goods, operating in the Netherlands and Suriname. As of November 2018, the company had 430 stores in the Netherlands. On 13 November 2024, Blokker was declared bankrupt by court order in Amsterdam. Blokker disappeared from the Dutch high street. But in Spring 2025, businessman Roland Palmer organized new financing, and began to open Blokker stores again, aiming for about 40 stores in total.

== History ==
=== Founding ===
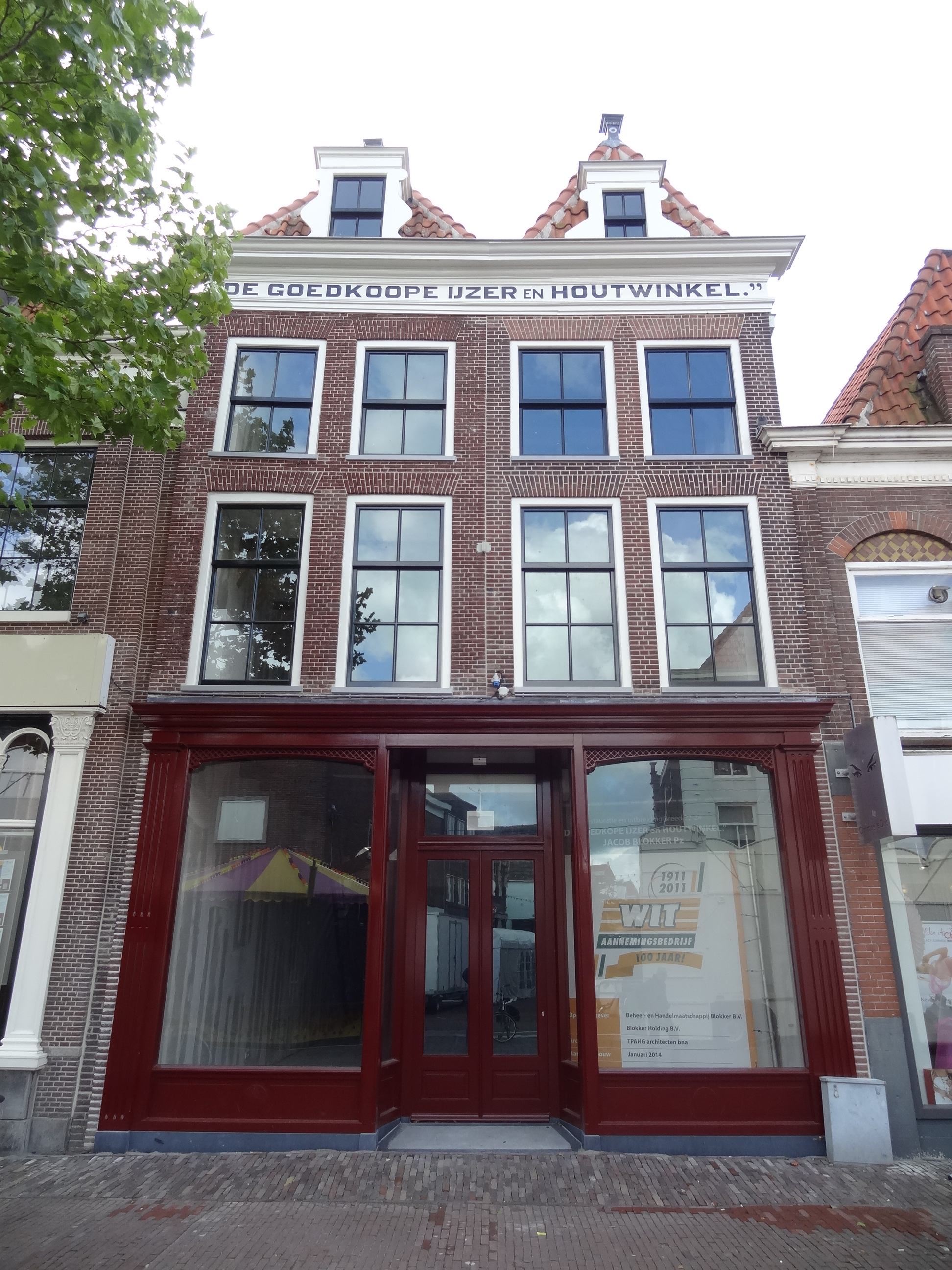
The restored Blokker buildings on Breed with reconstructed facade

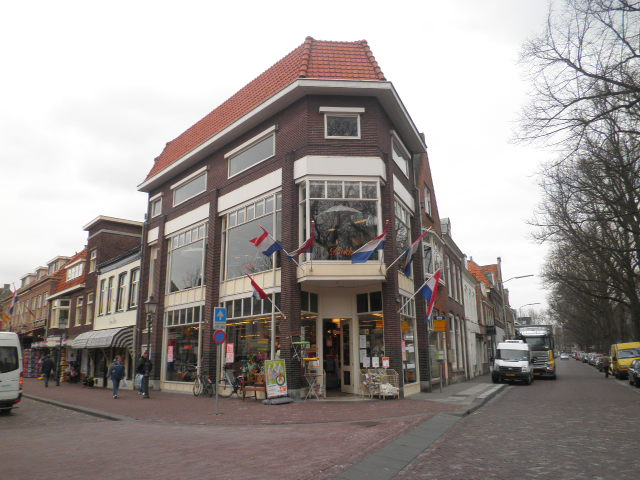
The oldest Blokker-built store on Breed and Veemarkt

On April 25, 1896, Jacob Blokker and his wife Saapke Kuiper founded De Goedkoope IJzer en Houtwinkel in Hoorn, located at Breed 22. The store quickly grew, expanding to several properties on the same street, including number 12. In 1923, an old building on the corner of Breed and the Veemarkt was purchased, transforming into a significant store for its time. This branch moved in March 2016 to a location on Gouw in Hoorn.

=== Expansion ===
Starting in the 1930s, the four sons of Jacob Blokker and Saapke Kuiper opened multiple stores in the Randstad region under the name Gebroeders Blokker. This tradition continued through successive generations, growing Blokker into a national, and later international, retail chain. Former CEO Jaap Blokker was named businessman of the year in 2003.

In 2015, Blokker had over 800 stores across the Netherlands, Belgium, Luxembourg, and Suriname. During the 2010s, the company faced declining sales and losses, partly because it lagged in e-commerce. Efforts to reverse this trend included store renovations and modernization. The American actress Sarah Jessica Parker was featured in 2016 television campaign to refresh Blokker's image. Additionally, store closures were implemented; in Belgium, 69 of 190 stores closed, and 50 stores shut down in the Netherlands. In May 2017, it was announced that another 100 stores in the Netherlands would close.

=== New ownership ===
On November 12, 2018, the Blokker family announced their intention to sell a majority stake in the chain. To ensure the company would be in good hands, Ab and Els Blokker were willing to provide financial support to the new owner. In April 2019, CEO Michiel Witteveen of Blokker Holding acquired the chain for 1 Euro, from the Blokker family, without external investors.He also got 800.000.000 Euros from the family, to pay the workers employed by Blokker.

On February 18, 2020, Blokker announced that all stores in Belgium and Luxembourg would be sold to the Dutch Retail Group, led by entrepreneur Dirk Bron, who would rebrand the stores as discounters named Mega World. Only eight of the 123 stores in Belgium and Luxembourg were profitable. Financial struggles persisted, and by October 2020, Mega World sought creditor protection. The chain was declared bankrupt on December 22, 2020. In the meantime, Blokker appointed a new CEO, Jeanine Holscher, to revitalize the remaining stores in the Netherlands and Suriname, as well as the brand itself.

== Organization ==
=== Ownership ===
Logo used from 2016 until its bankruptcy in 2024.

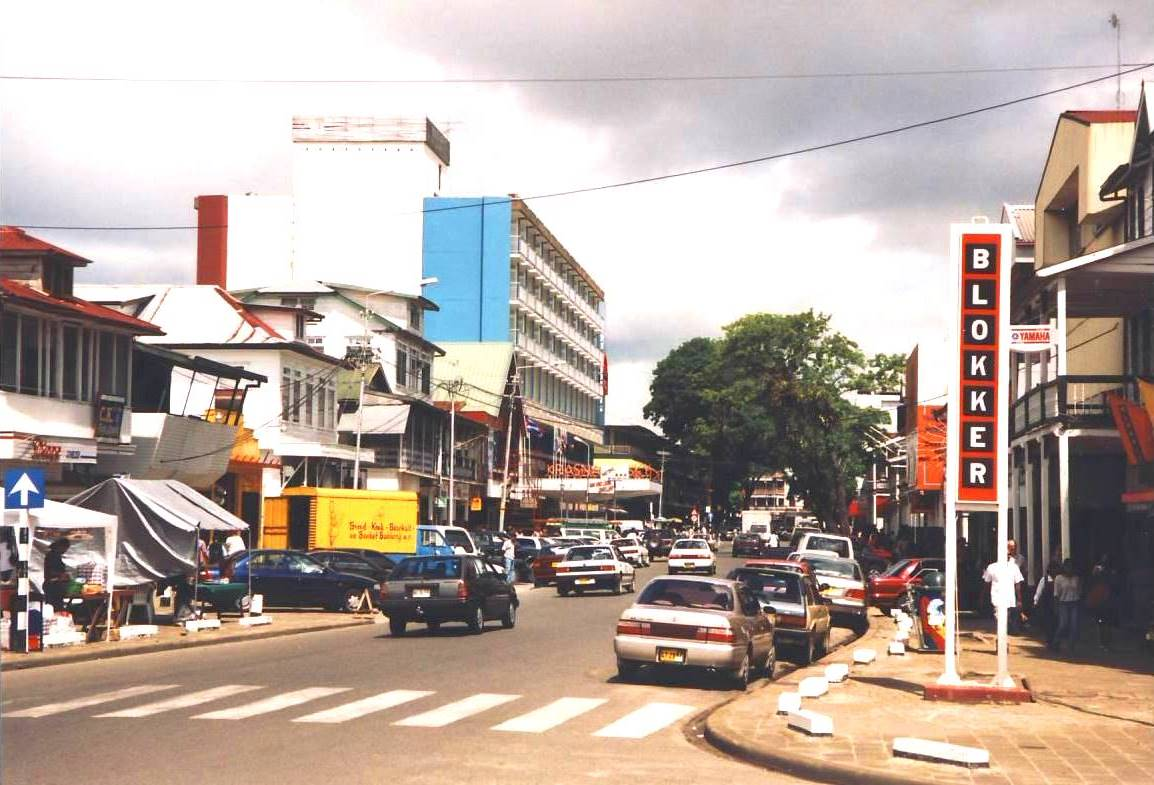
Blokker store in Paramaribo, Suriname

Blokker was the foundation of the international retail and wholesale group Blokker Holding until the company's sale in 2019 to the Mirage Retail Group, which also owns brands like Intertoys, Big Bazar, Miniso, and BCC.

=== Headquarters and Distribution Centers ===
Blokker's headquarters is located in Amsterdam on Van der Madeweg. The company has one distribution center in Geldermalsen, Netherlands, which, with a surface area of 90,000 square meters, is one of the largest in Europe. It supplies all Blokker stores in the Netherlands and Suriname and handles online orders from Blokker.nl.

In August 2015, the company opened a new distribution center in Gouda to handle online orders from Blokker.nl and Blokker.be. This center closed on August 1, 2019, consolidating distribution to Geldermalsen, which was modernized.

Until 2015, another logistics center operated in Houten, handling all online orders. The Houten center employed about 100 people. Until 2018, there was also a distribution center in Mijdrecht for seasonal items and toys. Operations there were gradually scaled down in 2017. Hudson's Bay later took over this distribution center.

== Literature ==
- Henk Povée (1996). The Century of Blokker. A Hundred Years of Household Goods in the Netherlands, Bussum: Thoth Publishing. ISBN 90 6868 145 1.
- Teri van der Heijden & Barbara Rijlaarsdam (2018). Blokker: How the Empire Slipped from the Family's Hands. Amsterdam: Ambo Anthos. ISBN 9789026341205
