= Bart Smit =

Dutch store-chain

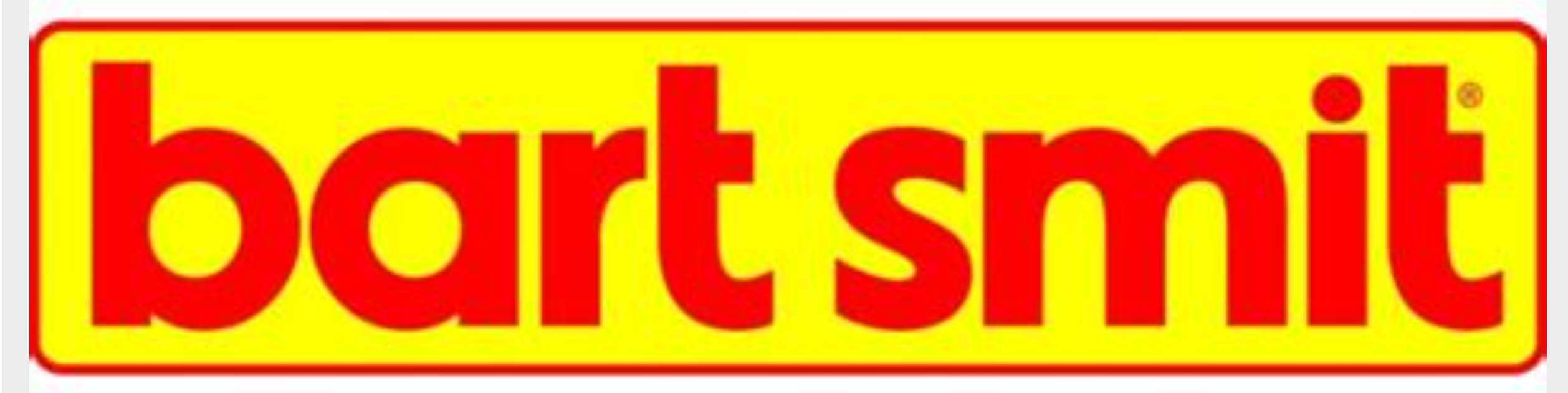

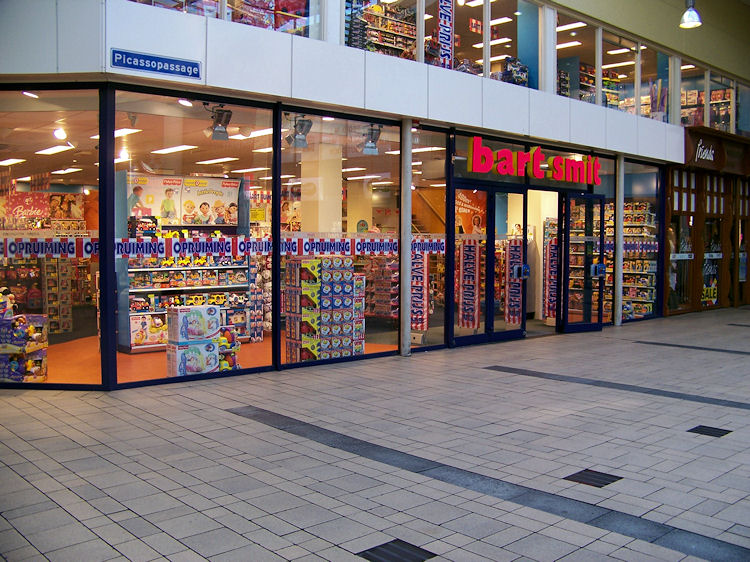
- A former Bart Smit-store in Emmen, converted in 2017 to Intertoys
- Industry: Retail
- Founded: 1 June 1967
- Headquarters: Netherlands
- Area served: Netherlands
- Products: Toys; Video games

Bart Smit B.V. was a Dutch store-chain that specialised in toys, multimedia and electronics.

== History ==
The chain started on 1 June 1967 as a small store in Volendam. Bart Smit originally sold toys, household appliances and kitchenware. Later Bart Smit started focussing exclusively on toys. The name of the owner was Bart Smit, which is also the origin of the chain's name. Until 1995 the chain was known as "Speelgoedpaleis Bart Smit" (Toy Palace Bart Smit).

In 1985 Bart Smit was acquired by Blokker Holding. In 1999 Bart Smit started the daughter company E-Plaza, specialising in computer games. In 1989 Bart Smit opened its first shop in Belgium.

In 2008 Bart Smit had 189 stores in the Netherlands, 51 in Belgium (of which 40 in Flanders and 11 in Wallonia) and one in Luxembourg. In 2017, Blokker Holding started converting all Bart Smit stores in the Netherlands to Intertoys stores. This took longer than expected as some stores were too close to existing Intertoys branches. The Belgian branches were sold to and renamed Maxi Toys. Blokker Holding sold Bart Smit, Toys XL and Intertoys to British investor Alteri in October 2017.
