= Henk Bruna =

Dutch publisher and bookseller

Henk Bruna

Henk Bruna (11 June 1916 – 22 February 2008) was a Dutch publisher and director of the stationery and bookstore chain Bruna. He was a brother of A.W. (Abs) Bruna (1902–1996) and an uncle of the artist Dick Bruna.

From 1935 till 1982 Bruna was director of his own publishing and stationery and bookstore chain.

He also was founder of the Dutch branch of the Round Table, an international men's club. He began the Nederlandsche Tafelronde (the first Dutch Round Table) on 7 June 1946 in his city of birth Utrecht. In 1949 he became honorary member of the Nederlandsche Tafelronde and also after his 40th birthday at the age where one has to leave the club he remained concerned with the club. Bruna also was President of the Boekverkooperscollegie Eendragt (Bookseller's College Eendragt) from 1947 until 1980 and because his great accomplishments for this society he became Honorary President in 1980.

Bruna died in Huis ter Heide at the age of 91 years.
