= Green Swan =

Portuguese holding company

Green Swan SGPS S.A. is a Portuguese holding company, founded by business angels with extensive national and international experience in areas such as Management, Computer Engineering and new technologies, Marketing, Branding and Communication. Green Swan has a strategic focus on the toy industry and is one of the most relevant players in the European market.

In August 2018, Green Swan acquired the Spanish and Portuguese operations of Toys "R" Us.

With the acquisition of Maxi Toys, in the beginning of 2019, Green Swan's operations reached 6 European markets and a total of 230 stores. After this operation, Maxi Toys acquired all Bart Smit stores, achieving a presence in all Belgium territory and an enlarged number of stores.

In March 2019, Green Swan acquired Intertoys assets, saving 1,500 jobs and becoming the biggest toy retailer in continental Europe, managing 3 toys brands and directly stores in 7 European countries.
