= HP/De Tijd =

- Cover of HP/De Tijd (issue 39, 2000)
- Categories: News magazine
- Frequency: Monthly
- Publisher: Het Vrije Woord
- Founded: 1990; 35 years ago
- Country: Netherlands
- Based in: Amsterdam
- Language: Dutch
- Website: HP/De Tijd
- ISSN: 0924-9648
- OCLC: 783712545

HP/De Tijd is a Dutch language monthly opinion magazine. Its editorial offices are in Amsterdam, Netherlands. Alongside De Groene Amsterdammer, Vrij Nederland and Elsevier, it is one of the most influential Dutch opinion magazines.

The circulation of HP/De Tijd was 28,662 copies in the last quarter of 2008. The paid net circulation of the magazine was 19,168 copies in the last quarter of 2011.

== History ==
=== De Tijd ===
De Tijd
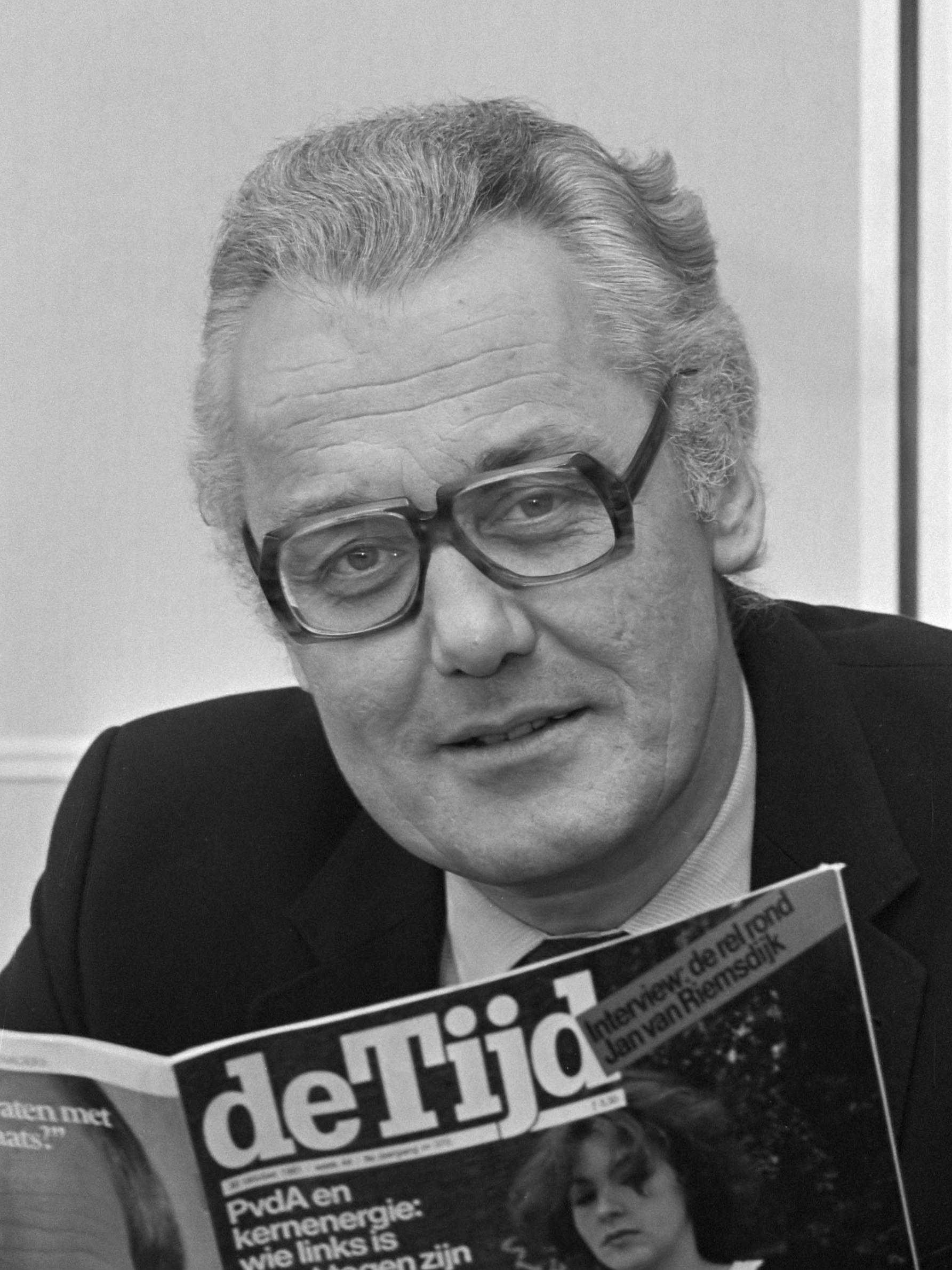
- Arie Kuiper with De Tijd (1981)
- Type: Daily newspaper
- Format: Broadsheet
- Founded: 17 June 1845
- Ceased publication: 1974
- Political alignment: Catholic
- Language: Dutch
- Circulation: 55000
- ISSN: 0166-2155

De Tijd was a Dutch-language Catholic newspaper published from 1845 until 1974. The first edition of De Tijd was published 17 June 1845 in 's-Hertogenbosch; at this time the newspaper appeared thrice weekly. Judocus Smits was the founder and editor in chief. In 1846 De Tijd (which at that time had 250 subscribers) moved to Amsterdam, in order to attract more subscribers. It also started publishing daily.

At the end of pillarisation, the number of subscribers diminished drastically. In 1959, De Maasbode, a Roman Catholic newspaper founded in 1885, merged into De Tijd and was added to the title. In 1966, the title was shortened again to De Tijd. De Tijd became a weekly magazine in 1974.

=== Haagse Post ===
Haagse Post was a social liberal news magazine published weekly from 1914 to 1969.

=== HP/De Tijd ===
In 1990, De Tijd merged with the Haagse Post weekly news magazine to become HP/De Tijd, a weekly news magazine. De Tijd was a Catholic weekly magazine. Audax Groep bought the magazine in 1994 from publisher HPU, VNU and MeesPierson bank. In the early 2000s HP/De Tijd was known for its right-wing discourse, often featuring right-wing personalities such as Pim Fortuyn.

On 25 April 2012, HP/De Tijd became a monthly published magazine. On 1 April 2022, Hp/De Tijd left the Audax Groep after 31 years. From then, it published by a newly established nonprofit, Het Vrije Woord.

== Editor-in-chief ==
- Ad 's-Gravesande (1990–1991)
- Gerard Driehuis (1991–1995)
- Auke Kok (1995–1996)
- Bert Vuijsje (1996–2000)
- Henk Steenhuis (2000–2008)
- Jan Dijkgraaf (2009–2010)
- Eduard van Holst Pellekaan (2010–2011)
- Frank Poorthuis (2011–2012)
- Daan Dijksman and Boudewijn Geels (2013)
- Tom Kellerhuis (2014–present)

== Ownership ==
- 1990-1994: Hollandse Pers Unie (70%), VNU (30%)
- 1995–2022: Audax Groep (100%)
- 2022–: Het Vrije Woord (100%)
