= Sidel =

French liquid packaging company

- Type: Private
- Industry: Food and Beverage Packaging, Manufacturing, System Engineering
- Founded: 1965 as Société Industrielle Des Emballages Légers SA
- Headquarters: Parma, Italy
- Area served: Worldwide
- Key people: Pietro Cassani (CEO); Igor Glaser (CFO)
- Revenue: ▲€1.415 billion (2018, net sales)
- Number of employees: 5,487 (2018)
- Parent: Tetra Laval
- Website: sidel.com

Sidel is a manufacturing company providing equipment and services for packaging liquids such as water; carbonated and non-carbonated soft drinks; sensitive beverages such as milk, liquid dairy products, juices, tea, coffee, isotonics and beer; food and home and personal care.

Sidel manufactures and services equipment that enables other companies to package such liquids using PET, can, glass and other materials. It specialises in manufacturing blow-moulding for production of PET bottles, plus fillers, labellers, pasteurisers, bottle and crate washer, packers, craters, and palletizers machines.

The company has 50 offices and 5,487 employees, nine research centres and over 40,000 machines installed in more than 190 countries (2018).

In 2003, Sidel joined Tetra Laval Group, a multinational corporation of Swedish origin, which is active in liquid food packages and packaging. The Tetra Laval group is divided into three divisions: DeLaval, Tetra Pak and Sidel.

== History ==
Since its foundation in 1965 in Le Havre, France, Sidel has been developing packaging technologies for the beverage industry. In 1961 the company developed the first plastic bottle made of polyvinyl chloride (PVC) as a container for edible oil and, later on, wine, milk and water. In 1973 Sidel released the first plastic HDPE (high-density polyethylene) bottle for milk, sterilised by ultra-heat treatment (UHT). In 1980 Sidel delivered its first PET blow moulding machine to the family-owned soft-drink company Barraclough in Great Britain. Sidel's first international subsidiary opened in 1984 in Atlanta, USA. In the same year, Sidel also sold the first high-speed PET blow moulding machine. In the 1990s Sidel acquired the French companies Hema (1995), Cermex (1996) and Gebo (1997). In 1997 Sidel introduced a system which combines blow moulding, filling and capping. In the same year, the first Sidel dry preforms decontamination by H_{2}O_{2} spray was launched with the Combi Disis. The development of an internal carbon-based coating in 1999 strengthened the barrier properties of PET packages to gases (O_{2} and CO_{2}) and made PET-bottles usable for beer. In 2003 Sidel joined Tetra Laval and merged with the Italian company Simonazzi in 2005. Simonazzi was founded in 1850 and had its headquarters in Parma, Italy. In April 2013, Sidel announced the launch of a new company as part of the Sidel Group, Gebo Cermex. Gebo Cermex focuses on engineering, line integration and end-of-line packaging. A partnership with Kortec was communicated in October 2013. The target of the co-operation is to develop new light-blocking PET milk bottles. In March 2014, the divestment of Swedish subsidiary, Tectubes, was announced.

=== Acquisition by Tetra Laval ===
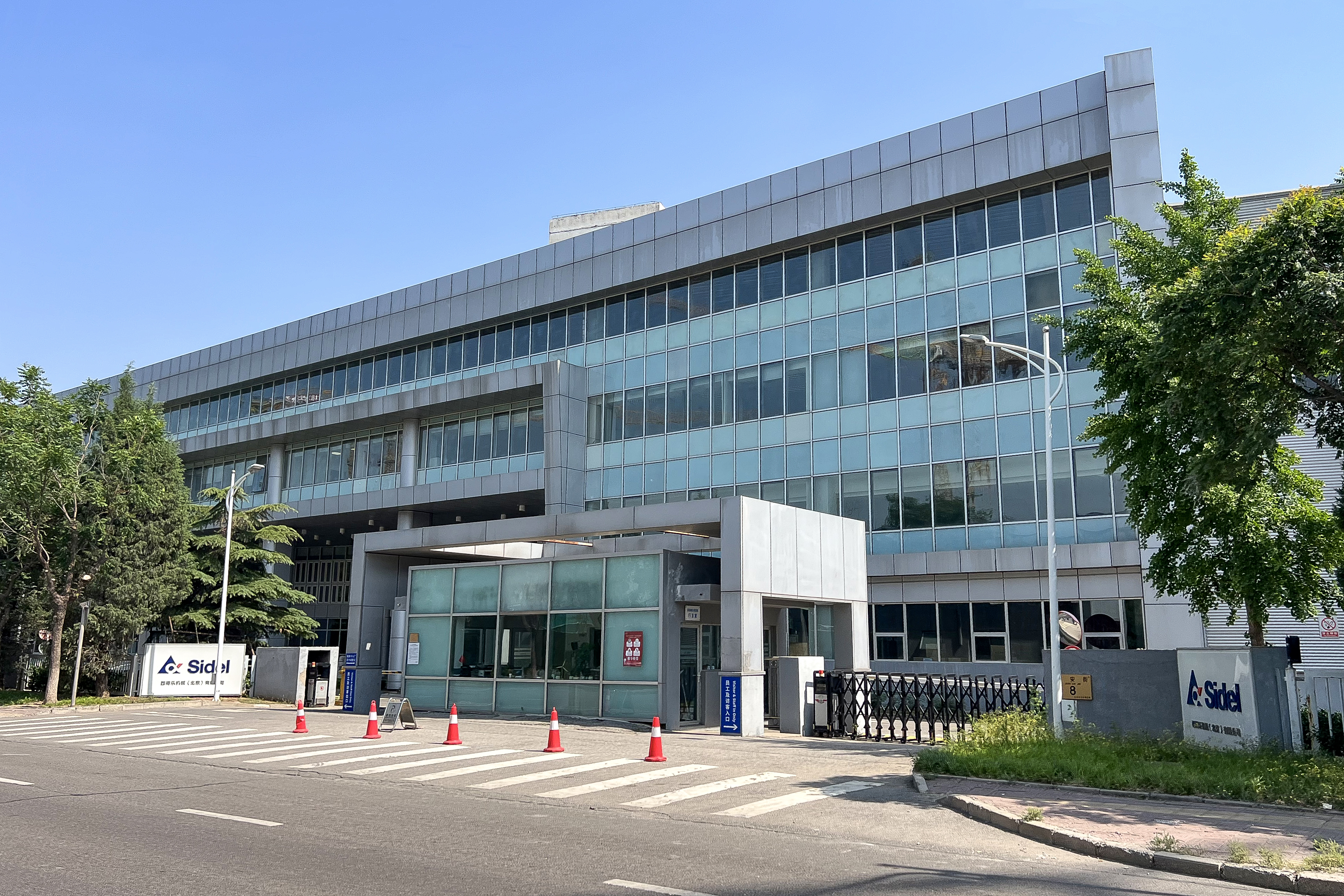
Sidel Machinery (Beijing) Co Ltd headquarters in Majuqiao, Beijing, with Tetra Laval logo

The European Commission's Merger Task Force initially opposed the acquisition by Tetra Laval of Sidel, then valued at 1.7 billion euros. The Commission's opposition was eventually struck down in 2005 by the European Court of Justice, in a case that has become a landmark of European Union competition law.

== Fields of activity ==
=== Liquid filling ===
Sidel covers the entire process chain for liquid filling. The portfolio includes complete line solutions, including standalone equipment such as blow moulders, fillers, labellers and associated services. The aseptic filling lines comprise wet sterilisation technology and dry preform sterilisation using hydrogen peroxide. The single packaging functions can also be fitted to a combined line.

=== Packaging design ===
Another field of activity is the packaging design of PET bottles. In addition to the development of different shapes and sizes, this includes flexible moulding technologies as well as convenience aspects concerning the handling of large PET-containers or light weighting and logistical aspects such as better storing solutions.

=== Equipment training and maintenance ===
Sidel runs seven training facilities in France, Italy, Mexico, Brazil, United States, Malaysia and China. They offer seminars and technical trainings in different sectors such as filling technologies, maintenance and product applications. The company also took part in the European project "SKILLS, Multimodal Interfaces for Capturing and Transfer of Skills", funded by the European Framework Programme IST FP6. Sidel's contribution to the five-year project phase was to test and develop virtual and augmented reality platforms for industrial training. The company has also developed individual, customer-orientated on-the-job training and offers maintenance services on-site.
