= Toys "R" Us Middle East and Africa =

Toys "R" Us Middle East and Africa is a toy division, operated across twelve countries by four companies, with the brand under license from Tru Kids.

== History ==
=== Bahrain, Egypt , Kuwait, Oman, Qatar and the UAE ===
Since 1995 the Al-Futtaim Group has operated stores in Bahrain, Egypt, Kuwait, Oman, Qatar, and the United Arab Emirates.

=== Israel ===
Stores in Israel are operated by the Fishman Retail Group.

=== Saudi Arabia ===
Stores in Saudi Arabia are operated by Tasweeq Company.

=== South Africa, Botswana, Namibia and Zambia ===
Stores in South Africa, Namibia, and Zambia are also independently operated by Amic Trading Pty Ltd.
