= B8ta =

Retail in-service company

b8ta, inc.

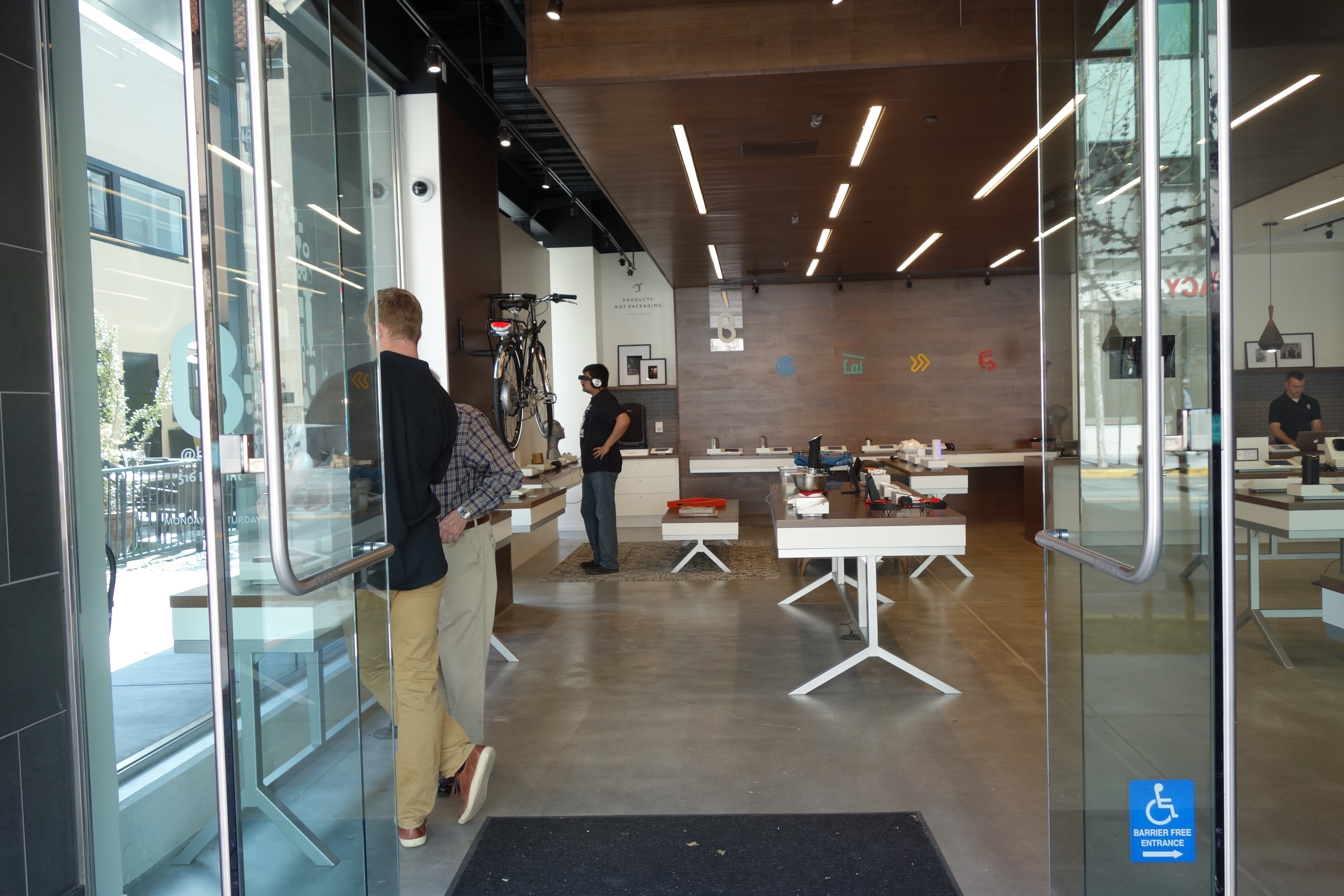
- Type: Private
- Industry: Retail
- Founded: December 2015; 10 years ago
- Founders: Vibhu Norby; William Mintun; Phillip Raub; Nicholas Mann
- Defunct: February 18, 2022; 4 years ago
- Headquarters: San Francisco, California, United States
- Number of locations: Standalone: 22; Forum: 1
- Website: b8ta.com

b8ta was a retail-as-a-service company which serve as presentation centers for consumer electronics and home goods. The company was founded in 2015 by Vibhu Norby, William Mintun, Phillip Raub, and Nicholas Mann. Its first location opened in Palo Alto in December 2015. Companies could pay to rent out space for their product to be displayed inside the locations, along with a tablet that each brand customizes with software. All of the products in stores were on display out-of-the-box and could be touched and demoed. The company also sold the products directly to consumers. Store employees, which the company calls "b8ta testers", assisted customers with demos and product information which is taught to them by companies with products on display. In November 2019, b8ta opened a fashion store named Forum in West Hollywood with the same business model.

b8ta closed its last retail stores in the United States on February 18, 2022, due to low traffic caused by the COVID-19 pandemic and a surge in burglaries.

== Ark ==
Ark (previously known as Built by b8ta) provides businesses with a platform to open physical showrooms for their products. The most prevalent is a 70 location store within a store concept with Lowe's. These areas operate under the SmartSpot banner and allow customers to interact with smart home products. Macy's Herald Square is also home to a pop-up space equipped with Ark's technology. In 2019, Tru Kids, the trademark holder of Toys "R" Us in the United States began using the Ark platform for its physical locations.

== Funding ==
In September 2016, b8ta raised a $7 million Series A round of funding. In June 2018, b8ta closed a $19 million Series B round led by Macy's, with participation from Sound Ventures, Palm Drive Capital, Capitaland, Graphene Ventures, Khosla Ventures and Plug and Play Ventures. The round brought b8ta's total funding to $39 million.

Macy's acquired a minority share in b8ta during June 2018.

In October 2019, b8ta raised a $50 million series C led by Evolution Ventures, with previous investors Macy's, Khosla Ventures, and others participating.

== Decline and closure ==
b8ta's high-end merchandise made it a frequent target for shoplifters and burglars, with security costs at its Hayes Valley store in San Francisco reaching $30,000 a month. b8ta closed two San Francisco locations in 2021 following numerous armed robberies.

b8ta closed its last retail stores in the United States on February 18, 2022, due to challenges stemming from the COVID-19 pandemic, which had caused foot traffic in some locations to decrease as much as 98% from peaks before the pandemic.

== See also ==
- Consignment
  - Consignment store (East Asia)
