= Otto Simon =

Dutch toy importer

Otto Simon is a Dutch importer, distributor, and franchiser of toys and homeware, headquartered in Almelo.

== History ==
The company was founded in 1911 by Otto Simon. At that time it was mainly a peddler company, specializing in beads and glassware. After the World War II, the emphasis shifted more to toys. In 1955 the company became a private company. Until 1970 the company was independent and grew into one of the largest toy importers in Europe. Domestically, it had a market share of 80%.

Since 1997 the company has evolved from a wholesaler into a retail organisation, with its own toy formulas Speelboom, Wigwam, Technohobby and Early Learning Centre. In 1999 the ELC formula was discontinued and in 2000 the formulas Wigwam and Speelboom were transferred to the new formula Top1Toys. In 2003, Ruud Schiphorst became the new owner of Otto Simon.

In 2021 Marskramer, Novy, Prima, Wholesaler Gouda and Toys2Play were acquired from the Audax Groep. In 2025, several branches of the bankrupt Blokker chain joined the Marskramer brand.

== Brands ==
=== Top1Toys ===
Otto Simon's toy stores Wigwam and Speelboom were combined under the formula Top1Toys in 2000. The chain had 110 stores in 2021. On 1 April 2023, it had 101 stores.

=== Marskramer ===
Marskramer is a chain of stores that sell homeware. It was acquired by Audax in 2019 from the Mirage Retail Group. The chain had 39 stores in November 2020 and 47 stores on 1 April 2023. After some former Blokker stores joined the chain, Marksramer had about 60 branches in 2025.
