= Audax Groep =

Print media company

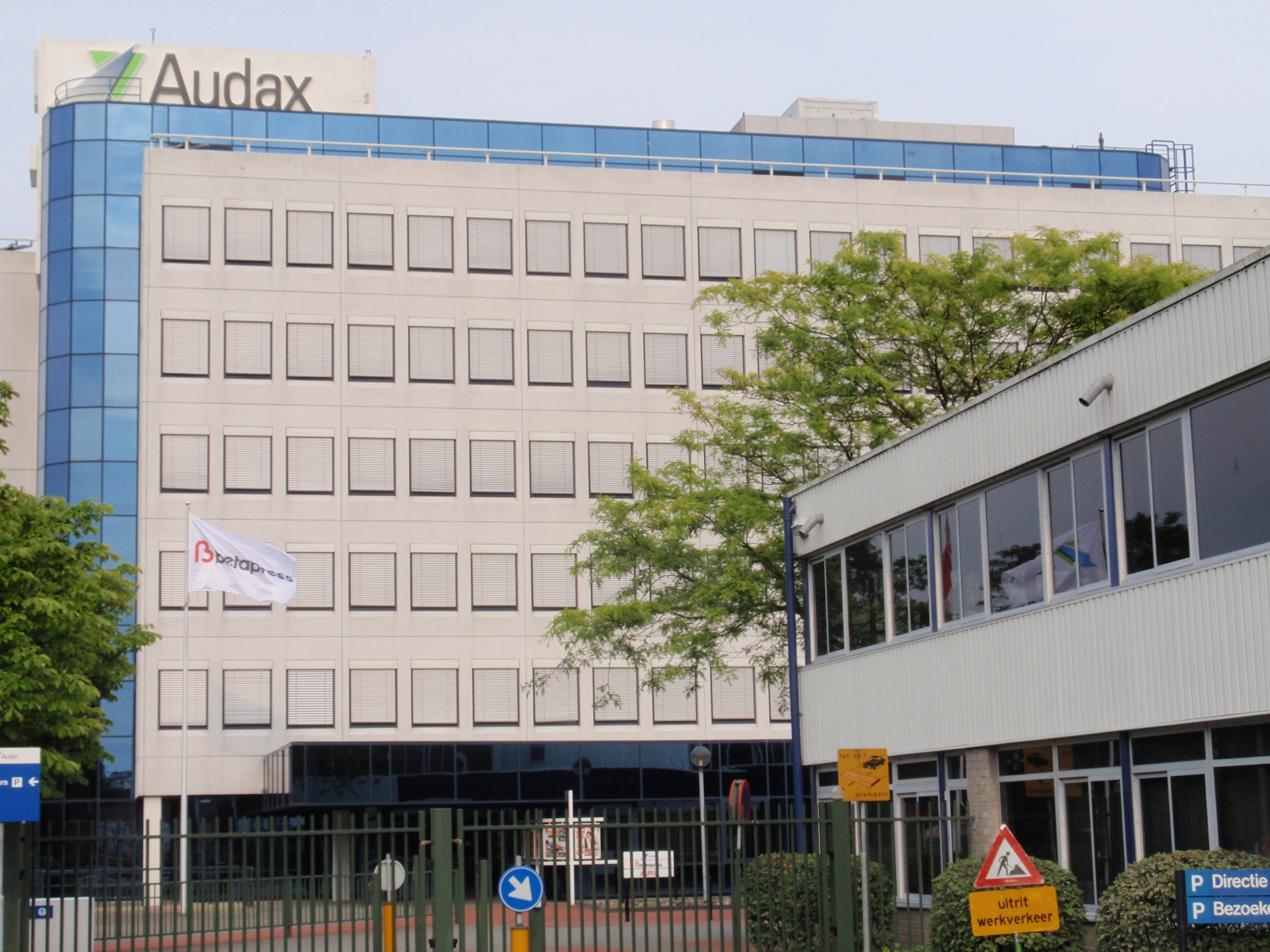
- Former Audax headquarters
- Type: Besloten Vennootschap
- Industry: Print media, retail
- Founded: 1958
- Founder: Jacques de Leeuw
- Headquarters: Rijen, Netherlands
- Key people: Hubert de Leeuw, chairman
- Products: magazines
- Owners: De Leeuw family members
- Website: audax.nl

Audax Groep is a Dutch print media and retail company, active also in Belgium. The publishing arm publishes magazines. It also produces and prints books, calendars, and flyers for other companies and builds websites. The Audax headquarters are located in Rijen.

== History ==
=== De Vrijbuiter publishing and group, 1947–1988 ===
Audax began in 1947 as Uitgeverij De Vrijbuiter (De Vrijbuiter Publishing), founded by Tilburg-native Hubert J.W. de Leeuw. A few years later, his son Jacques also joined the company. In 1958, the Vrijbuiter Groep was founded.

=== Jacques de Leeuw years, 1988–2017 ===
In 1988, the Vrijbuiter Group, based in Gilze, acquired BV Verenigde Lektuurbedrijven (VLB) in Amsterdam, resulting in the formation of the Audax Groep. VLB had acquired AKO in 1969. The headquarters of Audax and distribution activities (operating under the name Betapress) were centralized in Gilze, along the A58 motorway near the Tilburg-Reeshof exit. From a distance, the complex was easily recognizable due to its tall office building, completed in 1989. In 1988, Van Ditmar Boeken was merged into Audax.

On 10 December 2009, Jacques de Leeuw received the Mercur d'Or for consumer magazines at the Magazine Gala in Aalsmeer. The award was an oeuvre prize, recognizing De Leeuw's contributions to the publishing industry.

=== Hubert de Leeuw years, 2017–2026 ===
Jacques de Leeuw led the company until 2017 when he was replaced by his son, Hubert J.W.M. de Leeuw. In 2018, Audax sold magazine publisher Cascade to DPG Media, parting from magazines Primo, Eos, Bahamontes, Motoren & Toerisme and For Girls Only. But for Primo, DPG sold these magazines again. In November 2020, Audax Publishing published 11 magazines. Its most notables titles were HP/De Tijd, Weekend, Party, and Mijn Geheim. Most titles were acquired from the Finnish Sanoma concern. In 2019 Hubert de Leeuw was replaced by Casper de Nooijer.

Since 2020, Audax Groep had been losing money. In 2020, Hubert de Leeuw took the lead again. In May 2021 Audax published an intention to sell off the Marskramer, Novy and Prima stores it had acquired in 2019. In August 2021, these were acquired by the toy chain Otto Simon. On 1 April 2022, HP/De Tijd left the Audax Groep after 31 years. Since then, HP/De Tijd is published by a newly established nonprifit, Het Vrije Woord. On 1 January 2023, Hans Willem Cortenraad replaced Hubert de Leeuw as CEO, who stayed on as chairman. By 2025, Audax was down to 6 magazines.

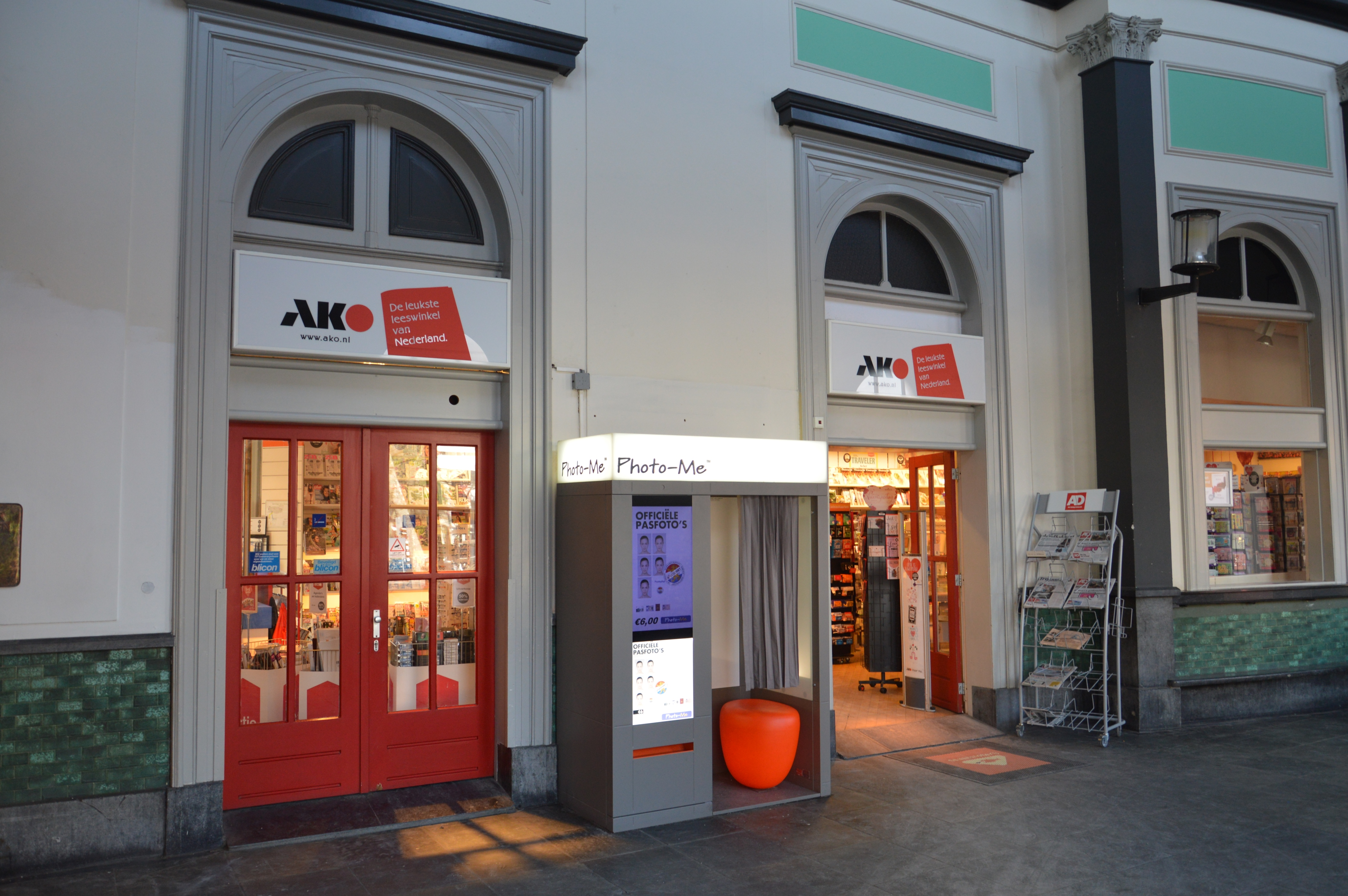
AKO store in Dordrecht railway station

=== Lector Capital, 2026– ===
In January 2026, the De Leeuw family sold the company to the Lector Capital group from Den Bosch. Following the takeover, Lector Capitol sold books wholesaler Van Ditmar Boeken in March 2026. In November 2026, Audax and daughter Bruna are on the verge of collapse.

== Audax Retail ==
=== Current chains ===
==== Bruna ====
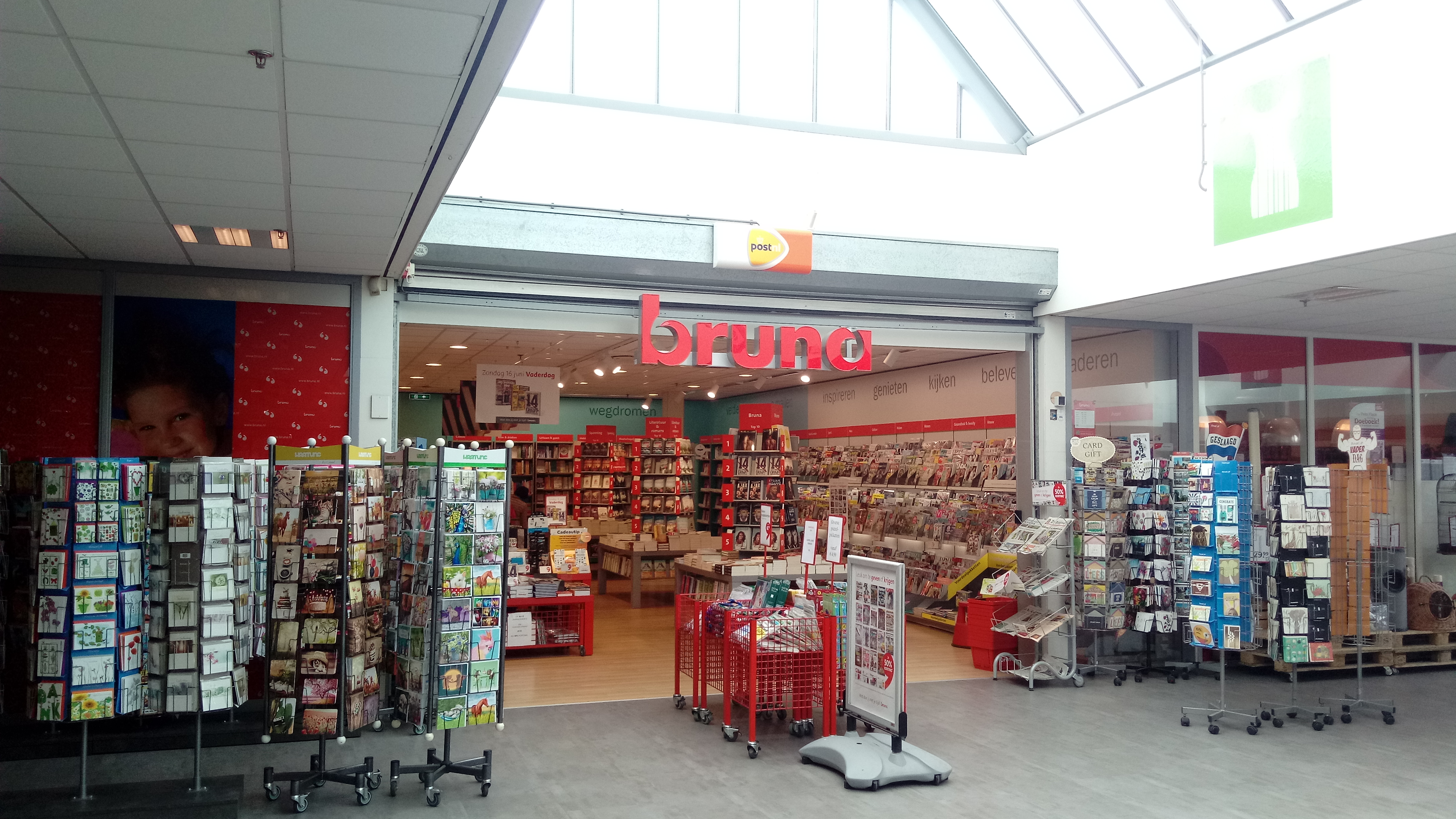
Bruna store in Hoogezand.

Bruna is a Dutch bookseller. In addition to books it sells newspapers, magazines, stationery, computer software, and cards. Bruna was founded in 1868 as a bookselling and publishing firm. The company was led by Henk Bruna from 1935 to 1982. ֿIts head office was in Houten until spring 2019, when as a cost-cutting measure it relocated to Amsterdam.

In early 2017, the book chain was in serious financial trouble; its main stockholders came to the rescue in February. In December 2017 the company was acquired by the publisher Veen Bosch & Keuning (VBK). In late 2019, the company was acquired by Audax, the parent company of competing bookseller Algemene Kiosk Onderneming (AKO). In November 2020, Bruna operated 270 shops. In April 2023, the number of stores was down to 244. By July 2025, the number of stores had increased to 261, due to the retirement of the AKO brand.

==== Read Shop ====
Read Shop is a network of stores throughout the Netherlands that sell books, magazines, office supplies, tobacco products, and snacks. The number of stores in April 2023 is 144, down from 170 in November 2020. In July 2025, there are 129 stores. There are thoughts also to convert the Read Shop stores to Bruna stores.

=== Former chains ===
==== AKO ====
The Algemene Kiosk Onderneming (AKO) was a Dutch kiosk and bookstore chain. The company was founded in 1878 as the Amsterdamsche Kiosk Onderneming. Many shops were located at railway stations. A typical shop stored 1,500 books and 2000 magazines. Dutch and international newspapers, magazines, and books were sold. The stores also sold basic office supplies, greeting cards, lottery and football pool tickets, gift cards, tobacco products, light beverages, and sweets. In April 2023 it had 66 stores, down from 72 stores in November 2020. In 2023, it was decided to the discontinue the brand due to loss of income from tabaco products. By 2024, the last AKO stores were converted to the Bruna brand.

==== Novy and Prima ====
Novy and Prima were a homeware and appliances stores, subsidiaries of Marskramer. Novy (founded 1997) had 15 stores in November 2020. Primahad 26 stores had November 2020. Both Novy and Prima stores often doubled as Toys2Play stores. All Novy and Prima stores were rebranded Marskramer after the acquisition by Otto Simon.
