= Corcelles-lès-Cîteaux =

- Commune
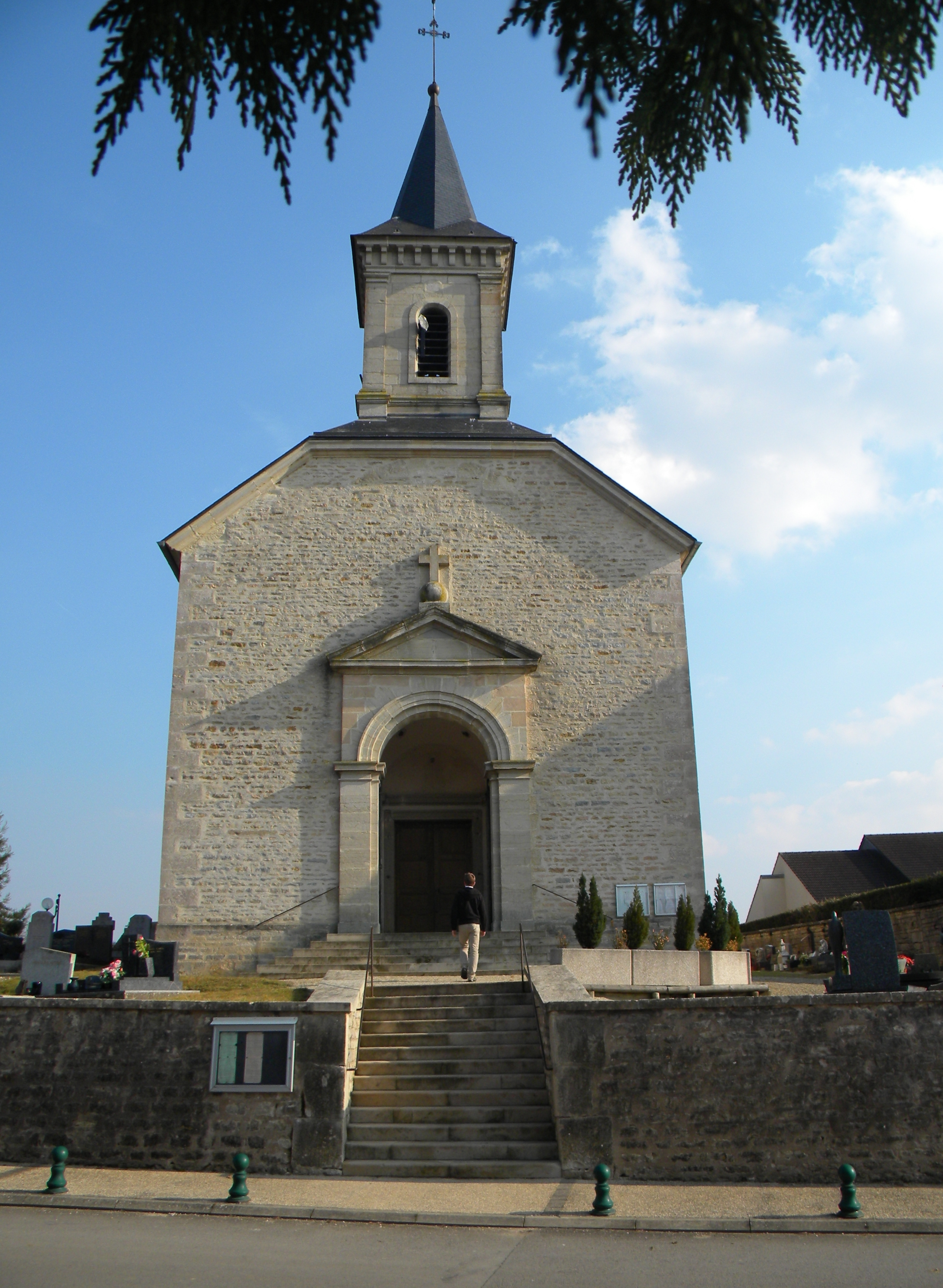
- The church in Corcelles-lès-Cîteaux

- Coat of arms
- Location of Corcelles-lès-Cîteaux
- Location within France Location within Bourgogne-Franche-Comté
- Coordinates: 47°10′22″N 5°04′58″E
- Country: France
- Region: Bourgogne-Franche-Comté
- Department: Côte-d'Or
- Arrondissement: Beaune
- Canton: Nuits-Saint-Georges

Government
  - Mayor (2022–2026): Samia Djemali
- Area^{1}: 6.75 km^{2} (2.61 sq mi)
- Highest elevation: 227 m (745 ft)
- Lowest elevation: 199 m (653 ft)
- Population (2023): 839
  - Density: 124/km^{2} (322/sq mi)
- Time zone: UTC+01:00 (CET)
  - Summer (DST): UTC+02:00 (CEST)
- INSEE/Postal code: 21191 /21910
- ^{1} French Land Register data, which excludes lakes, ponds, glaciers > 1 km^{2} (0.386 sq mi or 247 acres) and river estuaries.

Corcelles-lès-Cîteaux (French pronunciation: [kɔʁsɛl lɛ sito]) is a commune in the Côte-d'Or department in eastern France.

== Population ==
Historical population
Year	Pop.	±% p.a.
1968	178	—
1975	262	+5.68%
1982	456	+8.24%
1990	525	+1.78%
1999	720	+3.57%
2007	832	+1.82%
2012	839	+0.17%
2017	811	−0.68%
2023	839	+0.57%
Source: INSEE

== History ==
The commune is located 18 km south of Dijon. It held several names throughout its history: Corcellae (in 871), Curcella (between 1100 and 1110), Curcellae (in 1163), Corcellae in Silva (throughout the 13th century), Corcellae in Nemore (in 1212), Corcellae aux Bois (in 1217), Corclles le bois lez Citeaux (in 1375), Courcelles le bois les Cisteulx (in 1544), Courcelles les Bois (in 1637), Corcelles lez Citeaux (in 1645) and Corcelles au Bois (under the first Republic).

== See also ==
- Communes of the Côte-d'Or department
