= BCC (store) =

Former Dutch store chain

BCC Elektrospeciaalzaken
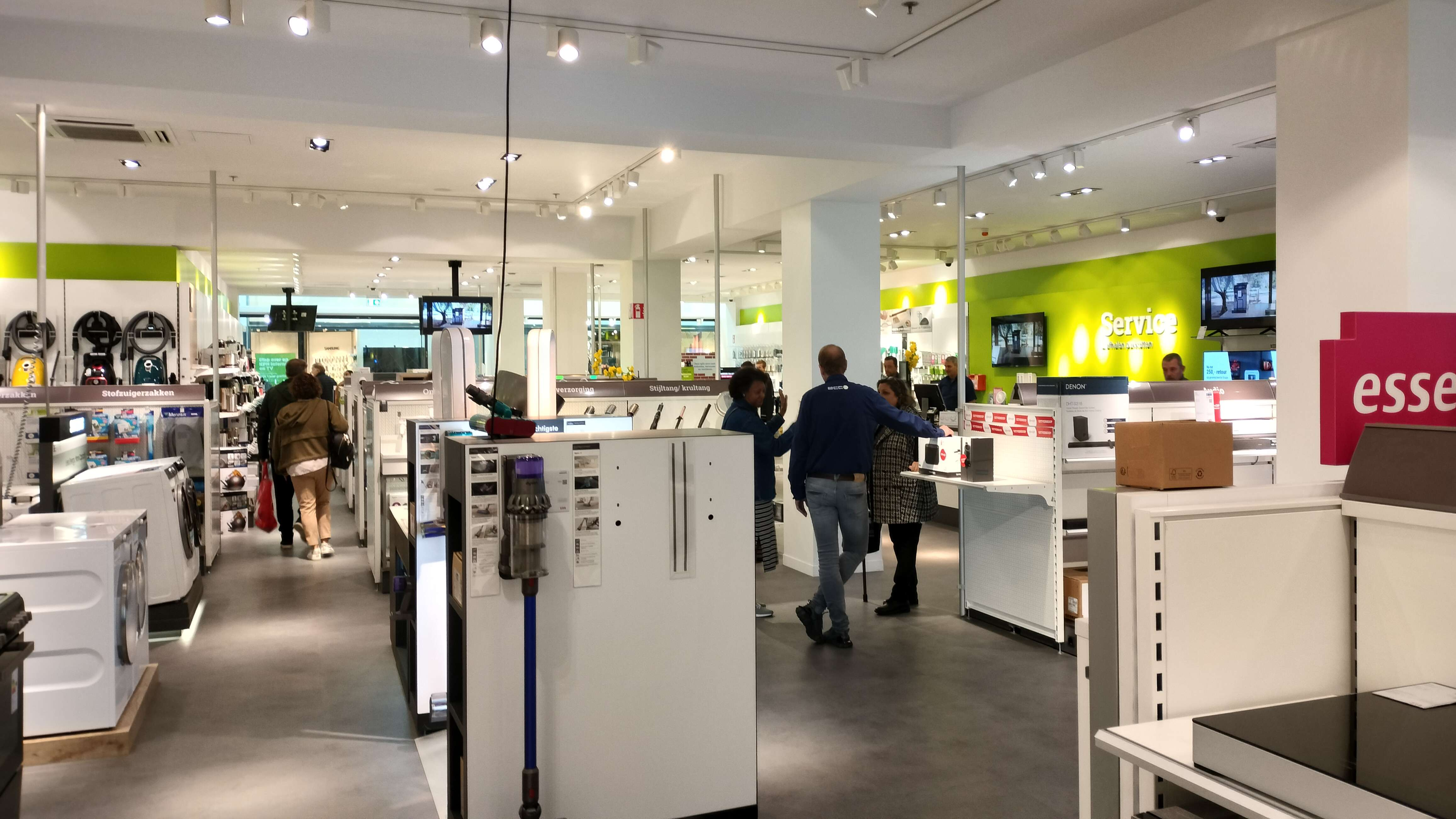
- Industry: Retail
- Founded: 1945
- Headquarters: Netherlands
- Areas served: Netherlands
- Key people: Herman Bakker
- Owner: Mirage Retail Group
- Number of employees: ~1,500 (2013)
- Website: bcc.nl

BCC, originally Bakker Cash & Carry, was a Dutch retail chain selling consumer electronics. They were declared bankrupt on 22 September 2023.

== History ==
In 1945, Herman Bakker opened an electronics shop in Amsterdam-West. Together with his sons Carel and Coos, a second branch was opened in Amsterdam-Osdorp at the Tussen Meer in 1962; this branch was part of the Radio West chain. From 1969, Carel and Coos Bakker continued the business under the name BCC.

In October 2009, BCC took over Amsterdam's Polectro, and the two Polectro branches were transformed into BCC branches. The branch in Stadshart Amstelveen, which is 2.7 kilometres away from Polectro's main branch, was discontinued as a result of this takeover.

In October 2014, BCC had 57 shops in the Netherlands and a significant proportion of its sales are realised online. From 1 February 2015, BCC acquired 18 shops from HiM Retail, the owner of the De Harense Smid, Mikro-Electro and It's shop formats. The deal further involves HiM Retail closing around 10 shops, as they would compete too much with the BCC shops. BCC will take over around 150 employees. After the acquisition, BCC will have 69 shops.

On 14 September 2023, owner Mirage Retail Group announced that it sees no future in the loss-making company and has filed for a moratorium. A week later, it filed for bankruptcy.
