= Mirage Retail Group =

Dutch company; owner of retail store chains

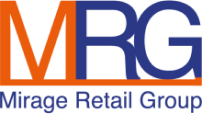
- Founded: 21 February 1973
- Founder: Jacob Blokker
- Headquarters: Netherlands
- Owner: Michiel Witteveen
- Subsidiaries: Blokker Intertoys, Bart Smit, Big Bazar, Intertoys, Leen Bakker, Marskramer, Xenos, BCC, Maxi Toys, Toys XL, Intertoys Xl, Miniso, elktroblok, Gamestore e-plaza
- Website: www.blokkerholding.nl

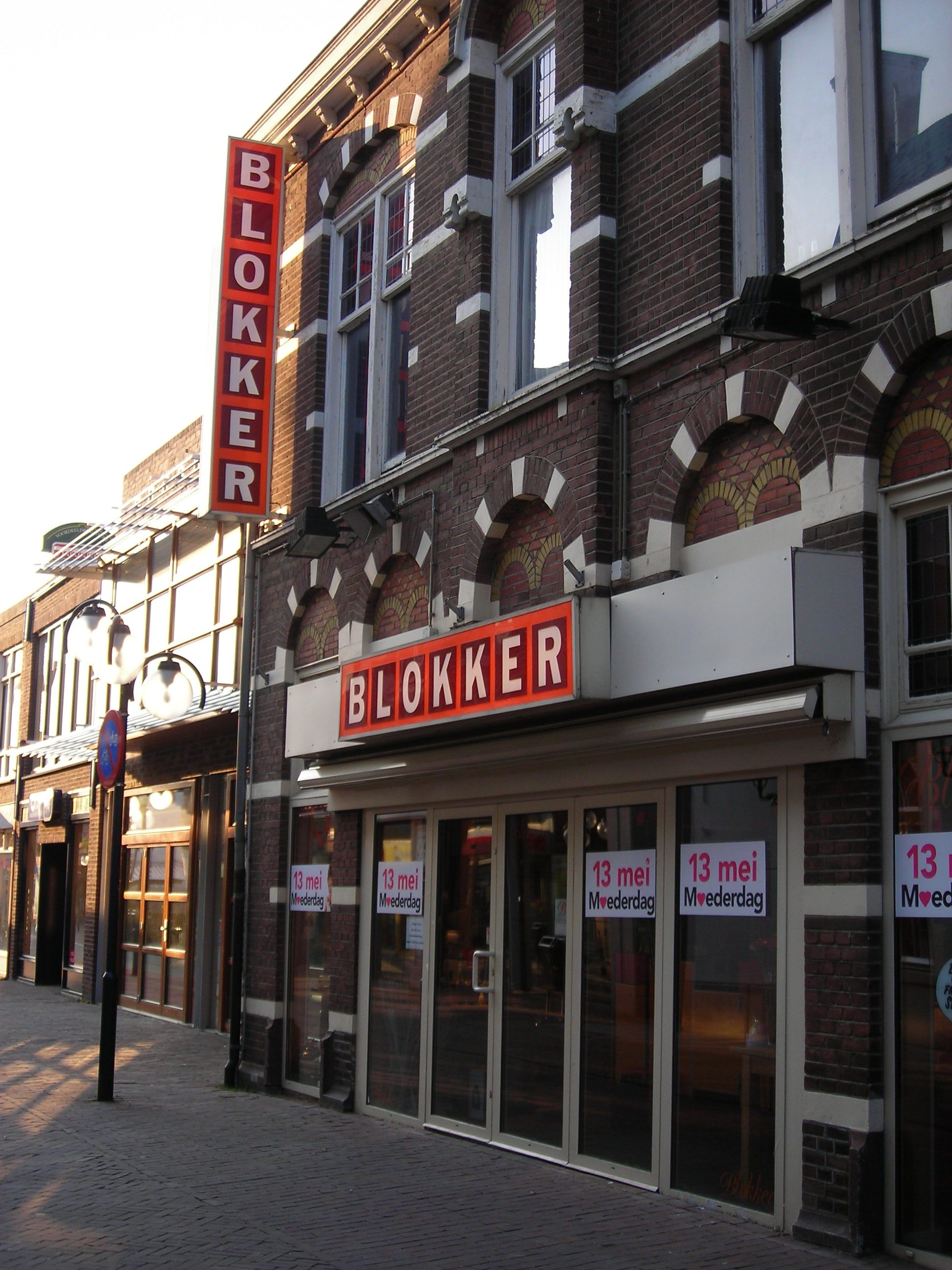
Blokker-store in Boxmeer

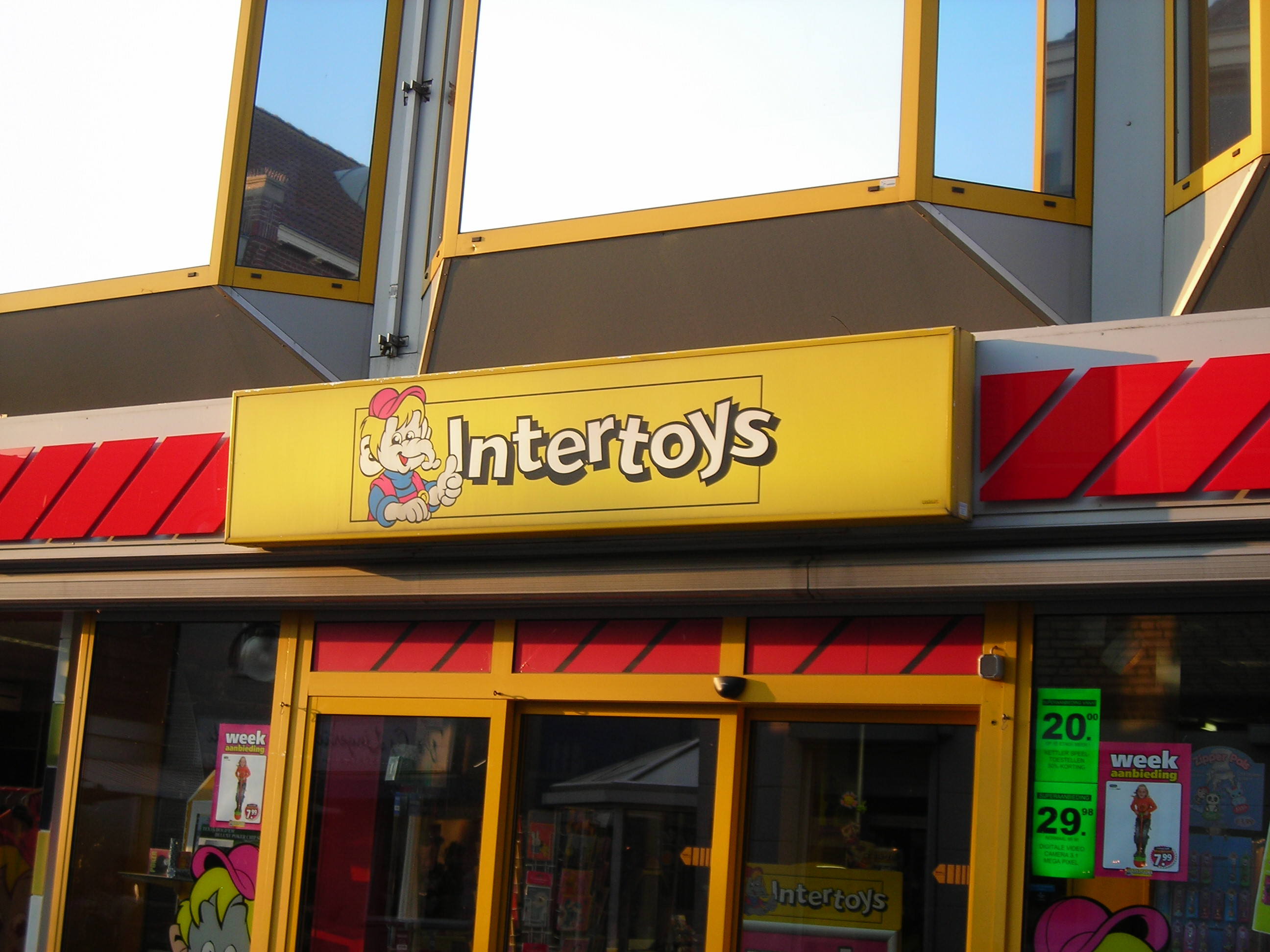
Intertoys-store in Boxmeer

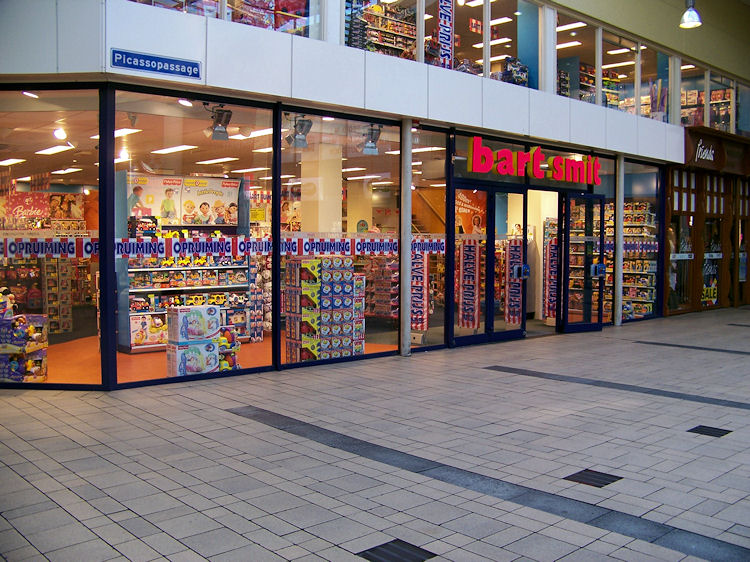
Bart Smit-store in Emmen

Mirage Retail Group (formerly Blokker Holding) is a Dutch company that owns several chains of stores.

Blokker Holding is active in twelve countries and in 2010 all the chains combined had 2825 stores. In 2015 the company had a revenue of 2.1 billion euro, of which 98 million euros from online retail. Most store chains have both stores they own and stores that are franchised to other investors.

In 2017, Intertoys was sold to private equity firm Alteri Investors for an undisclosed sum. Blokker Holding also stated that it would sell Xenos and Leen Bakker. On 22 January 2019, Blokker Holding sold Maxi Toys to Green Swan, a Portuguese investment firm. On 21 February 2019, Intertoys was declared bankrupt after being unable to restructure after a suspension of payments. On 8 March 2019, Intertoys was sold to Green Swan, although Blokker would later acquire Maxi Toys and Intertoys from the company just months later.

Blokker Holding has not entered the stock exchange. In 2019, the Blokker Family sold the holding company to Michiel Witteveen. Witteveen became the CEO and sold less profitable chains. In July 2019, Blokker Holding would be rebranded to Mirage Retail Group to avoid confusion between the holding company and the store chain.

Blokker stores in Belgium and Luxembourg were sold to Dutch Retail Group and were subsequently rebranded to Mega World. Maxi Toys was sold to King Jouet in August 2020 after the chain was facing bankruptcy. On 29 September 2020, the company acquired BCC from Fnac Darty. By December 2020, Mega World was declared bankrupt and announced that they would close all of their stores by 2021. The company claimed it was insolvent due to it being "over-indebted."

In September 2021, the company announced plans for an IPO by 2022. These plans were postponed by December 2021 due to the COVID-19 pandemic. By March 2023, Mirage Retail Group had scrapped its plans for an IPO.

On 22 September 2023, BCC was declared bankrupt just weeks after Mirage Retail Group stated that they were planning to sell the company. On 26 September 2023, just days after BCC was declared bankrupt, Big Bazar was also declared bankrupt, blaming substantial losses and a failed rescue attempt as a result of the decision. The company had also failed to pay employees during all of September 2023.

On 28 October 2024, Intertoys was once again sold, this time to ToyChamp. On 14 November 2024, Blokker was declared bankrupt, blaming years of losses as a result of the decision. Administrators planned to sell existing stock and assets of the company as well as selling a portion of the company. The company announced the closure of nearly all of its locations, with less than 50 stores remaining open by the beginning of 2025. On 9 December 2024, Mirage Retail Group was also declared bankrupt. In February 2025, Mirage Retail Group put Miniso Netherlands up for sale.

In May 2025, Blokker announced they would reopen 30 to 40 previously closed locations after they were acquired by businessman Roland Palmer in January.

== Companies ==
The following companies are part of Blokker Holding:

Store chain	Founded	Branches	In the Group	Countries	Segment	Notes
Big Bazar	2007	161	Sinds 2007	Netherlands, Belgiums	Homeware	Discount formula
Blokker	1896	413		Netherlands, Suriname	Homeware, garden needs, multimedia, toys	Core of the Mirage Retail Group; More than 20% of the branches are franchise. Founded on 25 April 1896 in Hoorn by Jacob (the grandfather of Jaap Blokker) and Saapke Blokker. Stores in Belgium and Luxemburg were sold in February 2020 to Dirk Bron.
Budget	2012	42		Netherlands	Homeware, perfumery/drugstore articles, sweets	Pull-up stores for the sell of dump and excess articles
Elektroblok	1962	1	since 1962	Netherlands	Homeware	Wholesale, mostly supplying to customers in the Netherlands
Miniso	2019	2	Since 2019	Netherlands	Homeware	Mirage Retail Group has franchise rights for the Netherlands
Intertoys	1976	301	Netherlands, Belgium, Germany		Toys	Sold in 2017 to Alteri Indigo Luxembourg S.À R.L. Bought back in 2019.
Maxi Toys		176	Belgium, France, Luxembourg, Switzerland, Turkey, Morocco		Toys	

Former formulas:

Name	Founded	Number of stores	Active in	Segment	Notes
Bart Smit	1967	234	Netherlands, Belgium, Luxembourg	Toys	Sold in 2017 to Alteri Indigo Luxembourg S.À R.L. who merged it into Intertoys. Intertoys was bought back.
Casa		517	France, Belgium, Luxembourg, Spain, Switzerland, Portugal, Italy	Furniture and interior decorating	
Cook&Co	2005	27	Netherlands	Food and dishware	Created from a merger of Holland Handels Huis and Hoyng. These stores were closed
Leen Bakker	1928	179	Netherlands, Belgium, Luxembourg	Furniture and interior decorating	
Marskramer	1940	206	Netherlands	Household appliances	Sold to the Audax Groep
Novy	1997	25	Netherlands	Household appliances	Daughter company of Marskramer, sold to the Audax Groep
Toys2Play	2002	Can be found in Marskramer, Novy and Prima stores	Netherlands	Toys	Daughter company of Marskramer, sold to the Audax Groep
Trend Centre	1978	1	-	-	Wholesale of Blokker Holding located in Amsterdam
Xenos	1973	252	Netherlands, Germany	Food, Household appliances, interior decorating	

Blokker Holding also operated:

- Giraffe
- Groenblok
- Holland Handels Huis
- Hoyng
- Gifts and Dreams
- Tuincentrum Overvecht
- E-Plaza
