= Jaap Blokker =

Dutch businessman

Jaap Blokker after receiving the Lifetime Achievement Award during the ING Retail Jaarprijs Gala in Hilversum, November 2010

Jacob "Jaap" Blokker (5 February 1942 – 5 July 2011) was a Dutch businessman and executive.

Blokker was born in Amsterdam. From 1976 to 2010 he was general director of Blokker Holding, which operates a series of chain stores in various countries; the best-known in the Netherlands is Blokker. He was also an outspoken critic of the euro and the effects of immigration, and published his criticism in the Blokker Holding annual reports.

== Death ==
Blokker died in Laren aged 69, of cancer.
