= Intertoys =

Dutch toy and video game retailer

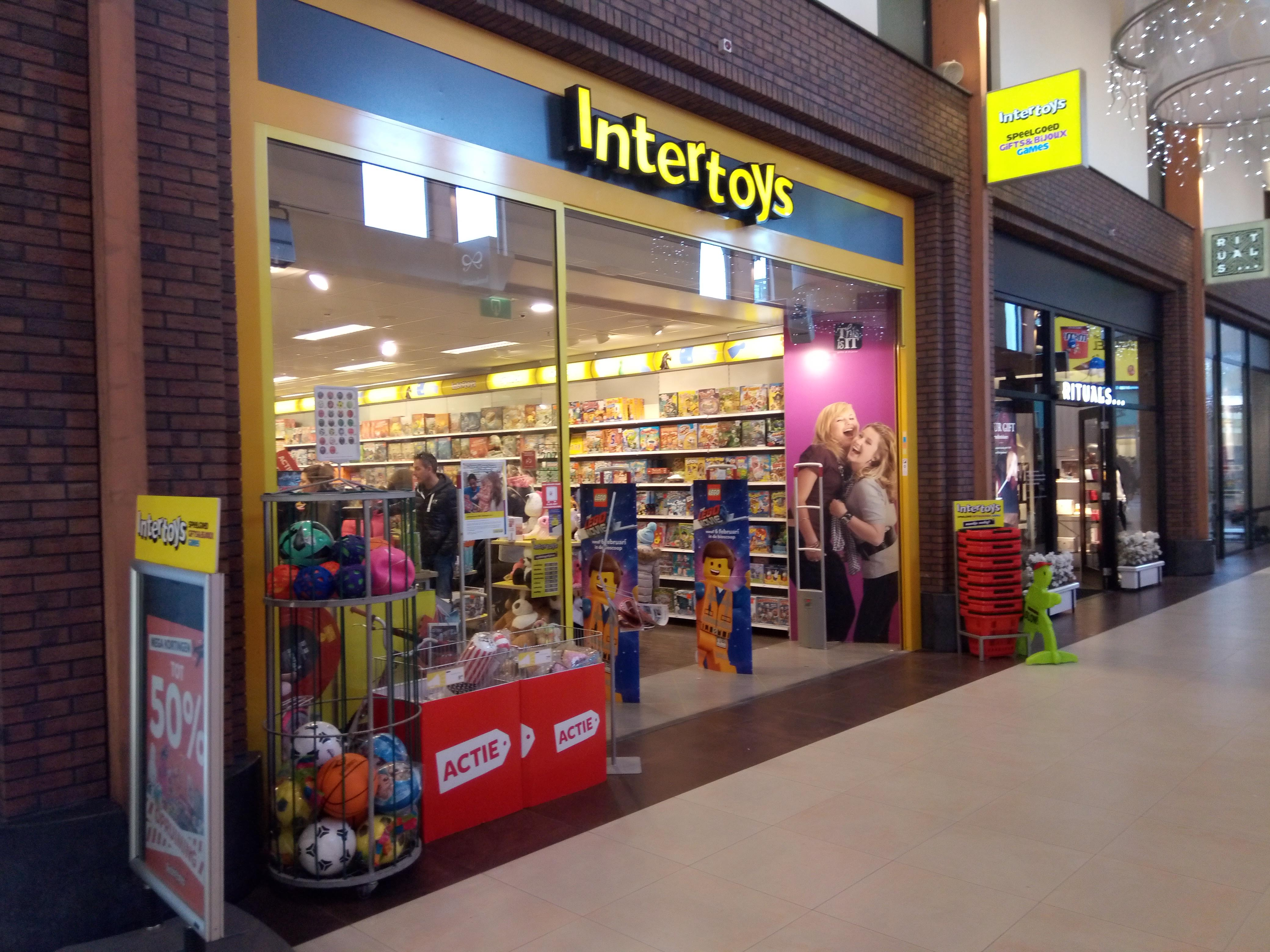
- Industry: Retail
- Founded: 1976
- Headquarters: Amsterdam, Netherlands
- Number of locations: 203 (2019)
- Area served: Netherlands
- Products: Toys; Video games
- Owner: Toy Champ
- Website: www.intertoys.nl

Intertoys is a Dutch chain of stores founded in 1976 that specialises in toys, multimedia and electronics. It is headquartered in Amsterdam.

== History ==
Intertoys was founded on June 25, 1976 by Hobo Faam, a purchasing cooperative of independent toy dealers. Interested members of Hobo Faam could apply for joining the Intertoys chain, agreeing to offer the same assortment of toys and carry Intertoys co-branding.
In 1979, upon reaching 50 members, Intertoys decided to retire the various independent brands of the local toy dealers operating its stores, instead emphasizing the unified Intertoys logo.
In September 1984, Intertoys founded its first non-franchised store, directly operated by the Intertoys company and not an independent toy dealer.

In 1993, Intertoys was acquired by Blokker Holding, who would go on to own the company until 2017.

In October 2017 Alteri Investors, a branch of Apollo Global Management, acquired Intertoys from Blokker Holding.

In 2017, Intertoys had approximately 500 stores, of which around 450 were located in the Netherlands. More than 100 of these were franchise stores and 15 were XL megastores. 11 stores were operated in Belgium and 29 in Germany.

In February 2019, Intertoys applied for an automatic stay. On 21 February the company declared bankruptcy. During this time, only Intertoy's web store and franchise stores remained open. Following the company's bankruptcy, negotiations began on finding a new owner.

On March 8, 2019, it was announced that Green Swan, a Portuguese toy retailing specialist, had bought Intertoys with the intention to keep all stores open.

In early September 2019, the former parent company of Intertoys, Mirage Retail Group (formerly Blokker Holding), announced their intention to acquire the company from Green Swan. On September 20, 2019, the Dutch Authority for Consumers and Markets cleared the acquisition.

In March 2020, Intertoys operated 123 stores, in addition to 80 stores operated by franchisees. In 2016, the company had approximately 1,100 employees. By April 2023, Intertoys operated 219 stores.
