= Tru Kids =

American business that owned the Toys "R" Us and Babies "R" Us brands

Tru Kids, Inc.
- Trade name: Tru Kids Brands
- Formerly: Geoffrey LLC (2018–2019)
- Type: Private
- Industry: Retail
- Predecessor: Toys "R" Us, Inc.
- Founded: January 20, 2019; 7 years ago
- Headquarters: Parsippany-Troy Hills, New Jersey, U.S.
- Area served: Worldwide (excluding Canada)
- Key people: Yehuda Shmidman (CEO, WHP Global) Richard Barry (CEO emeritus), Matt Finigan (CFO, Treasurer); Jean-Daniel Gatignol (senior vice president, "R" consumer brands)
- Brands: Toys "R" Us; Babies "R" Us; Kids "R" Us; Geoffrey's Toy Box
- Owner: WHP Global (controlling owner) Solus Asset Management Ares Management
- Subsidiaries: Toys "R" Us; Babies "R" Us
- Website: trukidsbrands.com

Tru Kids, Inc. (/tru/; doing business as Tru Kids Brands) is an American retail and licensing company, established on January 20, 2019, after its lenders cancelled the bankruptcy auction and took over the Toys "R" Us intellectual property in October 2018.

The company operates the Toys "R" Us locations in the United States, and licenses the Toys "R" Us brand to operators outside of the United States. The company owns the rights to the Toys "R" Us brand globally, except for Canada.

== History ==
On October 1, 2018, Toys "R" Us issued a court filing for the bankruptcy, after the company's shut down since June 28, 2018. Tru Kids planned a merge for the company, to rerun as new Toys "R" Us. Tru Kids managed agreements with the company, to be its successor, and to be renamed "Tru Kids" from Geoffrey LLC.

The company unveiled plans for a preliminary venture to be known as Geoffrey's Toy Box (Tru Kids' division), a wholesale store-within-a-store concept that the company planned to deploy in time for the holiday shopping season. The company planned to revive the Toys "R" Us and Babies "R" Us brands in the future. In November 2018, it was announced that agreements had been made with the grocery market chain Kroger. Kroger will add toy displays under the Geoffrey's Toy Box brand to some of its locations, to sell selections of Toys "R" Us private-label products for the holiday season. The brand, Geoffrey's Toy Box, operates as Geoffrey LLC, an intellectual property holding company within Toys "R" Us.

On January 20, 2019, the bankruptcy plan went into effect, and the Toys "R" Us, Inc. trademarks were transferred to Tru Kids.

In July 2019, Tru Kids announced they would open two stores at the Galleria Mall in Houston, Texas and the Westfield Garden State Plaza in Paramus, New Jersey as they touted a United States comeback. As part of opening the stores, Tru Kids partnered with software powered company b8ta to power the physical shopping experience in the new stores.

On October 8, 2019, Tru Kids announced they had partnered with retailer Target to relaunch the Toys "R" Us e-commerce site. As part of the agreement, Target now powers toy assortment and fulfillment capabilities for Toys "R" Us.com and Toys "R" Us retail stores in the United States.

On November 27, 2019, Tru Kids opened their first reimagined United States retail store after being absent from the US retail landscape for over 16 months.

On January 15, 2021, Tru Kids closed their Galleria Mall Toys "R" Us location citing financial losses following the COVID-19 pandemic. Following that, on January 26, 2021, the Garden State Plaza location also closed. Toys "R" Us will continue to remain present in the United States as e-commerce only with partnership of Amazon.

In March 2021, brand management firm WHP Global acquired a controlling stake in Tru Kids. WHP announced plans to reopen Toys “R” Us stores in late 2021. WHP announced that they could come in various formats, including: Airport stores, pop-up stores, flagship stores, and mini stores in larger retailers.

== Units ==
=== Official divisions ===
- Geoffrey's Toy Box - intellectual rights

=== Acquired from Toys "R" Us, Inc. ===
- Toys "R" Us - branding
  - Babies "R" Us - branding
