= Sunday Times Rich List 2026 =

List of wealthiest residents of the UK

The Sunday Times Rich List 2026 is the 38th annual survey of the wealthiest people resident in the United Kingdom, published by The Sunday Times online on 15 May 2026 and in print as a magazine supplement on 17 May 2026.

The list was edited by Robert Watts who succeeded long-term compiler Philip Beresford in 2017. He noted that "The 38th edition of the rankings show the UK's 350 most affluent individuals and families share combined wealth of £784 billion — a 1.4 per cent rise on last year and a sum equivalent to a quarter of UK GDP."

Notable changes from the 2025 Rich List were "an exodus of wealthy individuals leaving the UK in the wake of tax changes unveiled by Rachel Reeves, the chancellor." New entrants included Christopher Harborne and Emily Eavis.

The list was widely reported by other media.

== Top 15 fortunes ==
| 2026 | | Name | Citizenship | Source of wealth | 2025 | |
| Rank | Net worth £ bn | Name | Citizenship | Source of wealth | Rank | Net worth £ bn |
|---|---|---|---|---|---|---|
| 01 | £38.000 ▲ | Dheeraj Hinduja and Sanjay Hinduja | United Kingdom | Industry and finance | 01 | £35.304 |
| 02 | £27.971 ▲ | David and Simon Reuben and family | United Kingdom | Property and Internet | 02 | £26.873 |
| 03 | £26.852 ▲ | Sir Len Blavatnik | United States & United Kingdom | Investment, music and media | 03 | £25.725 |
| 04 ▲ | £24.481 ▲ | Idan Ofer | Israel | Shipping and industry (Israel Corporation) | 05 | £20.121 |
| 05 ▲ | £18.939 ▲ | Guy, George, Alannah and Galen Weston and family | Canada & United Kingdom | Retailing | 06 | £17.746 |
| 06 ▲ | £18.177 ▲ | Christopher Harborne | United Kingdom & Thailand | Cryptocurrency | - | - |
| 07 ▲ | £16.411 ▲ | Nik Storonsky | United Kingdom | Revolut | 27 | £6.978 |
| 08 ▲ | £16.006 ▲ | Alex Gerko | United Kingdom | Finance (XTX Markets) | 20 | £8.745 |
| 09 ▼ | £15.194 ▼ | Sir Jim Ratcliffe | United Kingdom | Industry (Ineos) | 07 | £17.046 |
| 10 | £14.260 ▲ | Igor Bukhman and Dmitry Bukhman | Russia and Israel | Video games (Playrix) | 10 | £12.540 |
| 11 | £12.600 ▼ | Kirsten Rausing and Jörn Rausing | Sweden | Inheritance and investment (Tetra Pak) | 11 | £12.514 |
| 12 | £12.481 ▼ | Michael Platt | United Kingdom | Hedge fund (BlueCrest Capital Management) | 12 | £12.500 |
| 13 ▼ | £12.000 ▼ | Sir James Dyson and family | United Kingdom | Industry (Dyson) | 04 | £20.800 |
| 14 ▲ | £10.318 ▲ | Lord Bamford and family | United Kingdom | Industry (JCB) | 15 | £9.450 |
| 15 ▼ | £10.215 ▲ | Charlene de Carvalho-Heineken and Michel de Carvalho | Netherlands | Inheritance, banking, brewing (Heineken) | 13 | £10.090 |

== See also ==
- Forbes list of billionaires
- List of British billionaires by net worth
