= List of most-played mobile games by player count =

This is a list of the most-played mobile games ordered by their player count, which include reported player data, registered accounts, and monthly active users. For non-mobile games, see the list of most-played video games by player count. Mobile games are defined as games that have only been released on mobile operating systems, particularly Android and or iOS.

== List ==
Most-played mobile games by player count (with at least 50 million)
Game	As of	Player count (Note: Not including figures solely from app download counts)	Release date	Publisher(s)	Ref.
Free Fire	August 2021	150 million peak daily players	December 2017	Garena	
PUBG Mobile	August 2023	300 million monthly players	March 2018	Tencent Games/Krafton	
Call of Duty: Mobile	Nov 2024	1 billion downloads (Note: We should not use download counts. Another reference is needed.)	October 1, 2019	Activision	
Mini World	April 2020	400 million	December 26, 2015	Minovate	
Dragon Ball Z: Dokkan Battle	August 2021	350 million	January 30, 2015	Bandai Namco Entertainment	
Sonic Dash	February 2020	350 million	March 7, 2013	Sega	
Helix Jump	December 2018	334 million	February 10, 2018	Voodoo	
Gardenscapes: New Acres	May 2020	324 million	August 2016	Playrix	
Homescapes	May 2020	312 million	August 2017	Playrix	
Super Mario Run	August 2018	300 million	December 15, 2016	Nintendo	
Township	May 2020	274 million	February 24, 2012	Playrix	
Knives Out	September 2018	250 million	November 2017	NetEase	
Angry Birds 2	December 2019	230 million	July 30, 2015	Rovio Entertainment	
Honor of Kings / Arena of Valor	December 2017	200 million peak monthly players	November 26, 2015	Tencent Games	
QQ Speed Mobile / Speed Drifters	January 2020	200 million	December 29, 2017	TiMi Studios / Tencent Games / Garena	
Rise Up	December 2018	162 million	2018	Serkan Özyılmaz	
PES 2018 Mobile	August 2018	150 million	September 12, 2017	Konami	
War Robots	January 2020	150 million	April 14, 2014	Pixonic	
Mario Kart Tour	October 2019	123.9 million	September 25, 2019	Nintendo	
Ice Age Village	2013	120 million	April 5, 2012	Gameloft	
FIFA Mobile (now EA FC)	January 2018	113 million	October 1, 2016	EA Sports	
Subway Surfers	July 2019	100 million monthly players	May 24, 2012	SYBO Games	
Tiao Yi Tiao	January 2018	100 million peak daily players	December 2017	Tencent Games	
Drag Racing	February 2013	100 million	April 2011	Creative Mobile	
Junior Three Kingdoms	January 2018	100 million	March 2015	Youzu Interactive	
Ludo King	December 2018	100 million	December 17, 2016	Gametion Technologies Pvt Ltd	
One Piece Treasure Cruise	February 2019	100 million	May 12, 2014	Bandai Namco Entertainment	
White Cat Project	June 2016	100 million	July 14, 2014	Colopl	
Love Nikki-Dress UP Queen	May 2019	100 million	May 20, 2015	Tencent Games	
Mr Love: Queen's Choice	July 2019	90 million	December 14, 2017	Elex	
The Battle Cats	August 2023	84 million	September 17, 2014	PONOS	
Disney Tsum Tsum	November 2018	80 million	January 29, 2014	Line Corporation	
Puzzle & Dragons	January 2019	80 million	February 20, 2012	GungHo Online Entertainment	
The Simpsons: Tapped Out	April 2020	80 million	February 29, 2012	Electronic Arts	
Marvel: Avengers Alliance	March 2015	70 million	March 1, 2012	Disney Interactive	
Angry Birds Friends	August 2013	60 million	February 13, 2012	Rovio Entertainment	
Seven Knights	February 2021	60 million	February 5, 2016	Netmarble Japan	
Fate/Grand Order	February 2021	57 million	July 30, 2015	Aniplex / Type-Moon	
Gods of Boom	October 2018	55 million	May 18, 2017	Game Insight	
Final Fantasy XV: A New Empire	January 2019	51 million	June 29, 2017	MZ	
Clash Royale	September 2018	50 million daily players	March 2, 2016	Supercell	
Flappy Bird	February 2014	50 million	May 24, 2013	dotGears	
LINE Rangers	March 2018	50 million	February 28, 2014	Line Corporation	

== See also ==
- List of best-selling video games
- List of best-selling video game franchises
