= Sunday Times Rich List 2024 =

List of wealthiest residents of the UK

The Sunday Times Rich List 2024 is the 36th annual survey of the wealthiest people resident in the United Kingdom, published by The Sunday Times online on 17 May 2024 and in print on 19 May 2024.

The list was edited by Robert Watts who succeeded long-term compiler Philip Beresford in 2017. He noted that "this year's edition records the largest fall in the billionaire count in the guide's 36-year history, from a peak of 177 in 2022 to 165 this year. It seems the tide is going out and the world's wealthy are starting to leave."

The list was widely reported by other media.

== Top 20 fortunes ==
2024		Name	Citizenship	Source of wealth	2023	
Rank	Net worth £ bn	Name	Citizenship	Source of wealth	Rank	Net worth £ bn
01	£37.196 ▲	Gopi Hinduja	United Kingdom	Industry and finance	01	£35
02 ▲	£29.246 ▲	Sir Len Blavatnik	United States & United Kingdom	Investment, music and media	03	£28.625
03 ▲	£24.977 ▲	David and Simon Reuben and family	United Kingdom	Property and Internet	04	£24.399
04 ▼	£23.519 ▼	Sir Jim Ratcliffe	United Kingdom	Industry (Ineos)	02	£29.688
05	£20.8 ▼	Sir James Dyson and family	United Kingdom	Industry (Dyson)	05	£23.00
06 ▲	£17.2 ▲	Barnaby Swire, Merlin Swire and family	United Kingdom	Industry (Swire Group)	18	£8.38
07 ▲	£14.96 ▲	Idan Ofer	Israel	Shipping and industry (Israel Corp)	22	£8.00
08 ▼	£14.921 ▼	Lakshmi Mittal and family	India	Steel	06	£16.00
09 ▼	£14.493 ▼	Guy, George, Alannah and Galen Weston and family	Canada & United Kingdom	Retailing	07	£14.50
10 ▲	£12.867 ▲	John Fredriksen and family	Cyprus & Norway	Shipping and oil services	19	£4.556
11 ▼	£12.634 ▲	Kirsten Rausing and Jörn Rausing	Sweden	Inheritance and investment (Tetra Pak)	09	£12.00
12 ▲	£12.055 ▲	Alex Gerko	United Kingdom	Finance (XTX Markets)	15	£9.129
13 ▼	£12 ▲	Michael Platt	United Kingdom	Hedge fund (BlueCrest Capital Management)	10	£11.50
14 ▼	£11.751 ▼	Charlene de Carvalho-Heineken and Michel de Carvalho	Netherlands	Inheritance, banking, brewing (Heineken)	08	£13.122
15 ▼	£10.127 ▲	Hugh Grosvenor, 7th Duke of Westminster and Grosvenor family	United Kingdom	Inheritance and property	11	£9.878
16 ▼	£9.188 ▼	Marit Rausing, Lisbet Rausing, Sigrid Rausing, Hans Rausing	Sweden	Inheritance and investment (Tetra Pak)	12	£9.348
17 ▲	£19.168 ▲	Carrie Perrodo, François Perrodo and family	France / United Kingdom	Oil, gas, wine (Perenco)	26	£7.0
18 ▲	£7.937 ▲	Nicky Oppenheimer and family	United Kingdom / South Africa	Diamonds (De Beers)	25	£7.096
19 ▲	£7.65 ▲	Lord Bamford and family	United Kingdom	Industry (JCB)	32	£5.9
20 ▼	£7.467 ▼	Denise Coates and Peter Coates	United Kingdom	Gambling	16	£8.795

== See also ==
- Forbes list of billionaires
