= Sunday Times Rich List 2025 =

List of wealthiest residents of the UK

The Sunday Times Rich List 2025 is the 37th annual survey of the wealthiest people resident in the United Kingdom, published by The Sunday Times online on 16 May 2025 and in print on 18 May 2025.

The list was edited by Robert Watts who succeeded long-term compiler Philip Beresford in 2017.

He noted that "The Sunday Times's annual examination of the finances of Britain's most affluent individuals and families has been one of the toughest to compile due to Trump's tariffs and the ensuing stock market turbulence. The result is a stark reflection of the state of UK wealth. Falling fortunes have led many to drop off the list and others are no longer eligible, having fled Britain after Labour's non-dom crackdown."

The list was widely reported by other media.

== Top 15 fortunes ==
2025		Name	Citizenship	Source of wealth	2024	
Rank	Net worth £ bn	Name	Citizenship	Source of wealth	Rank	Net worth £ bn
01	£35.304 ▼	Gopi Hinduja	United Kingdom	Industry and finance	01	£37.196
02 ▲	£26.873 ▲	David and Simon Reuben and family	United Kingdom	Property and Internet	03	£24.977
03 ▼	£25.725 ▼	Sir Len Blavatnik	United States & United Kingdom	Investment, music and media	02	£29.246
04 ▲	£20.8	Sir James Dyson and family	United Kingdom	Industry (Dyson)	05	£20.8
05 ▲	£20.121 ▲	Idan Ofer	Israel	Shipping and industry (Israel Corporation)	06	£14.96
06 ▲	£17.746 ▲	Guy, George, Alannah and Galen Weston and family	Canada & United Kingdom	Retailing	09	£14.493
07 ▼	£17.046 ▼	Sir Jim Ratcliffe	United Kingdom	Industry (Ineos)	04	£23.519
08 ▼	£15.444 ▲	Lakshmi Mittal and family	India	Steel	07	£14.921
09 ▲	£13.683 ▲	John Fredriksen and family	Cyprus and Norway	Shipping and oil services	10	£12.867
10 ▲	£12.54 ▲	Igor Bukhman and Dmitry Bukhman	Russia and Israel	Video games (Playrix)	27	£6.349
11	£12.514 ▼	Kirsten Rausing and Jörn Rausing	Sweden	Inheritance and investment (Tetra Pak)	11	£12.634
12 ▲	£12.00 ▲	Michael Platt	United Kingdom	Hedge fund (BlueCrest Capital Management)	13	£11.50
13 ▲	£10.09 ▼	Charlene de Carvalho-Heineken and Michel de Carvalho	Netherlands	Inheritance, banking, brewing (Heineken)	14	£11.751
14 ▲	£9.884 ▼	Hugh Grosvenor, 7th Duke of Westminster and Grosvenor family	United Kingdom	Inheritance and property	15	£10.127
15 ▲	£9.45 ▲	Lord Bamford and family	United Kingdom	Industry (JCB)	19	£7.65

== See also ==
- Forbes list of billionaires
- List of British billionaires by net worth
