= Dmitry Bukhman =

Russian-British game developer (born 1985)

- Дмитрий Бухман
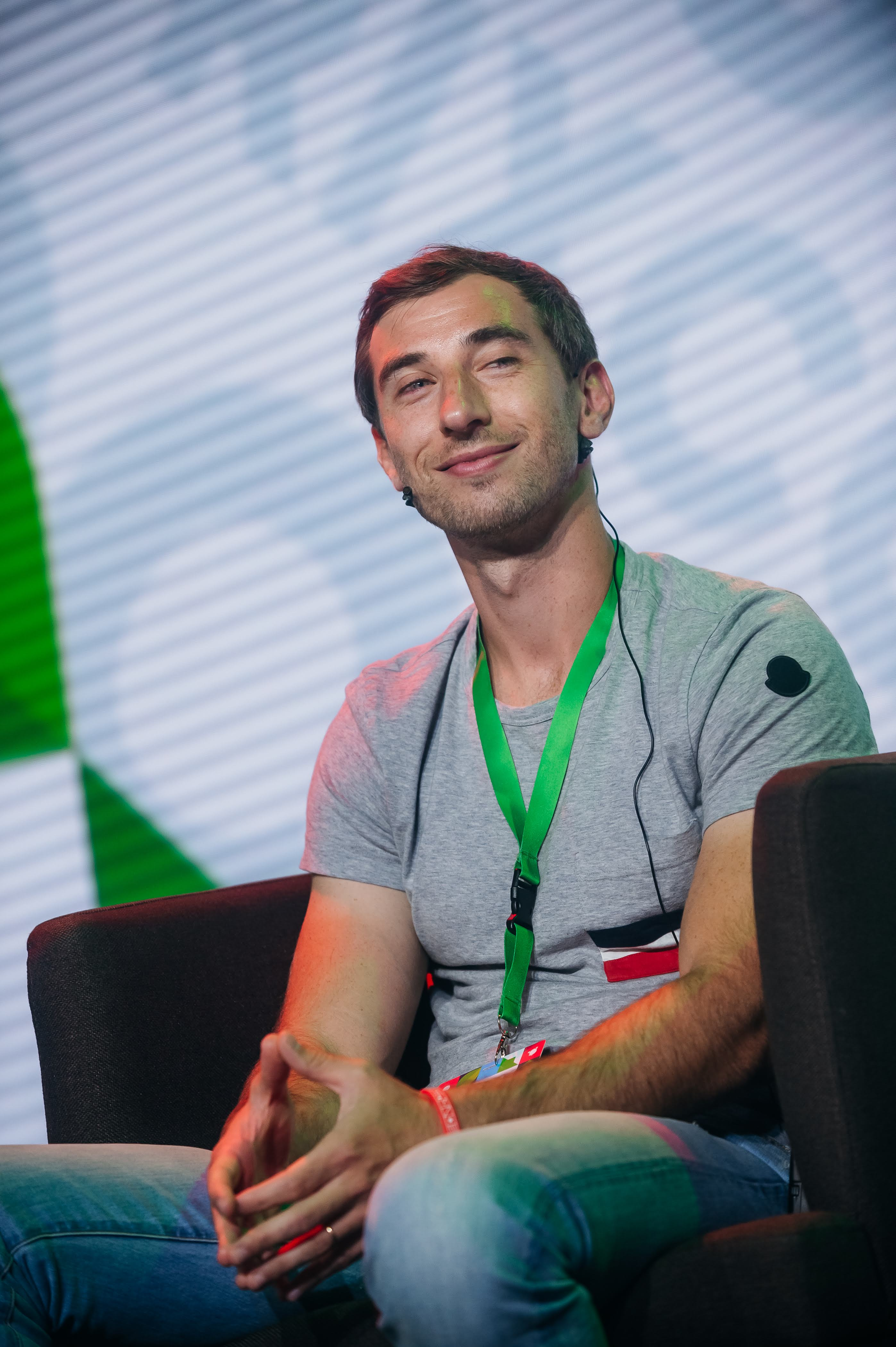
- Bukhman in 2018
- Born: 27 May 1985 (age 41); Vologda, Soviet Union
- Education: Vologda State Pedagogical Institute
- Children: 4
- Relatives: Igor Bukhman (brother)

Dmitri Bukhman (Russian: Дмитрий Бухман; born 27 May 1985) is a Russian-born British billionaire entrepreneur. Together with his brother Igor Bukhman, they founded Irish online gaming company Playrix, best known for its mobile-app games such as Township, Homescapes and Fishdom. As of March 2026, Forbes reports his net worth as US$13.6 billion.

== Early life ==
Bukhman and his brother Igor were born in the Soviet city of Vologda to Jewish parents. As a child, Bukhman was engaged in programming. He started selling games online with his brother while still in high school. They founded Playrix in 2004 while studying at the Faculty of Applied Mathematics at the Vologda State Pedagogical Institute. By 2004, the brothers had released three games and around 30 screensavers; by 2007, the number of games increased to 16, and the company's monthly income constituted around $300,000. Soon the company released such games as Homescapes, Gardenscapes, Fishdom and Township.

== Career ==
In 2018, the brothers personally invested in video and social network games developer Nexters Global and in Belarusian Vizor Games. In 2019, Playrix bought the Armenian and Serbian studios Plexonic and Eipix Entertainment, respectively. In October 2022, the company announced the closure of its offices and development operations in Russia and Belarus due to the Russian invasion of Ukraine. In 2023, the company employed more than 3,000 people around the world. In June 2023, analytics company Data.ai (formerly App Annie) ranked Playrix seventh in the global ranking of mobile publishers by annual revenue, with the company in first place in EMEA.

== Wealth ==
Bukhman entered Forbes' ranking of the richest people in the world in 2020 with a fortune of $3.1 billion. In April 2023, Forbes estimated Bukhman's assets at $7 billion: he ranked 332nd in the world, and 7th in the list of wealthiest Israelis. In October 2021, the Bukhmans launched the Rix Capital family fund. In 2023, the investment company, with $4 billion of the brothers' personal funds under management, opened a permanent office in London.

In 2025, he entered the top ten of the richest people in the UK according to The Sunday Times, and ranked first in their 40 Under 40 Rich list.

== Philanthropy ==
Bukhman Philanthropies was established in 2024 by Dmitry and Daria Bukhman. The foundation's three core focus areas are neonatal and maternal health, the mental health and wellbeing of children and young adults, and literature. In 2026, it became the supporting funder of the International Booker Prize in its tenth anniversary year. Major commitments in its first year of activity included a $10.5 million award to Duke University's Center for Child and Family Policy, a $10 million gift to Stanford University School of Medicine, and over $6 million to UNICEF for a longitudinal study on childhood in the digital age.

== Personal life ==
Bukhman is married and has four children. In 2014, he moved to Dublin. In 2016, he acquired Israeli citizenship. In 2020, he moved to London and in 2025 received British citizenship.

In 2025, he purchased Ahpo, a 115.10 m (377.6 ft) superyacht built by Lürssen, for a reported US$360 million.
