= Royal Match =

2020 video game

- App icon
- Developer: Dream Games
- Publisher: Dream Games
- Engine: Unity
- Platforms: Android, iOS
- Release: July 2020 (early access); February 25, 2021 (full release)
- Genre: Puzzle

Royal Match is a casual free-to-play tile-matching video game launched in 2021. It was developed and published by Dream Games. In it, players follow the fictional King Robert as he restores and refurbishes his castle. The game runs on the Unity game engine and is available for iOS through the App Store and Android via Google Play, the Amazon Appstore, and the Galaxy Store. Since 2023, Royal Match has been amongst the top ten largest mobile games by monthly revenue globally. There are about 55 million monthly active users.

A sequel, Royal Kingdom, starring King Robert's younger brother King Richard, was fully released on November 21, 2024; it had already surpassed $20 million in revenue since its soft launch in April 2023.

== Gameplay ==
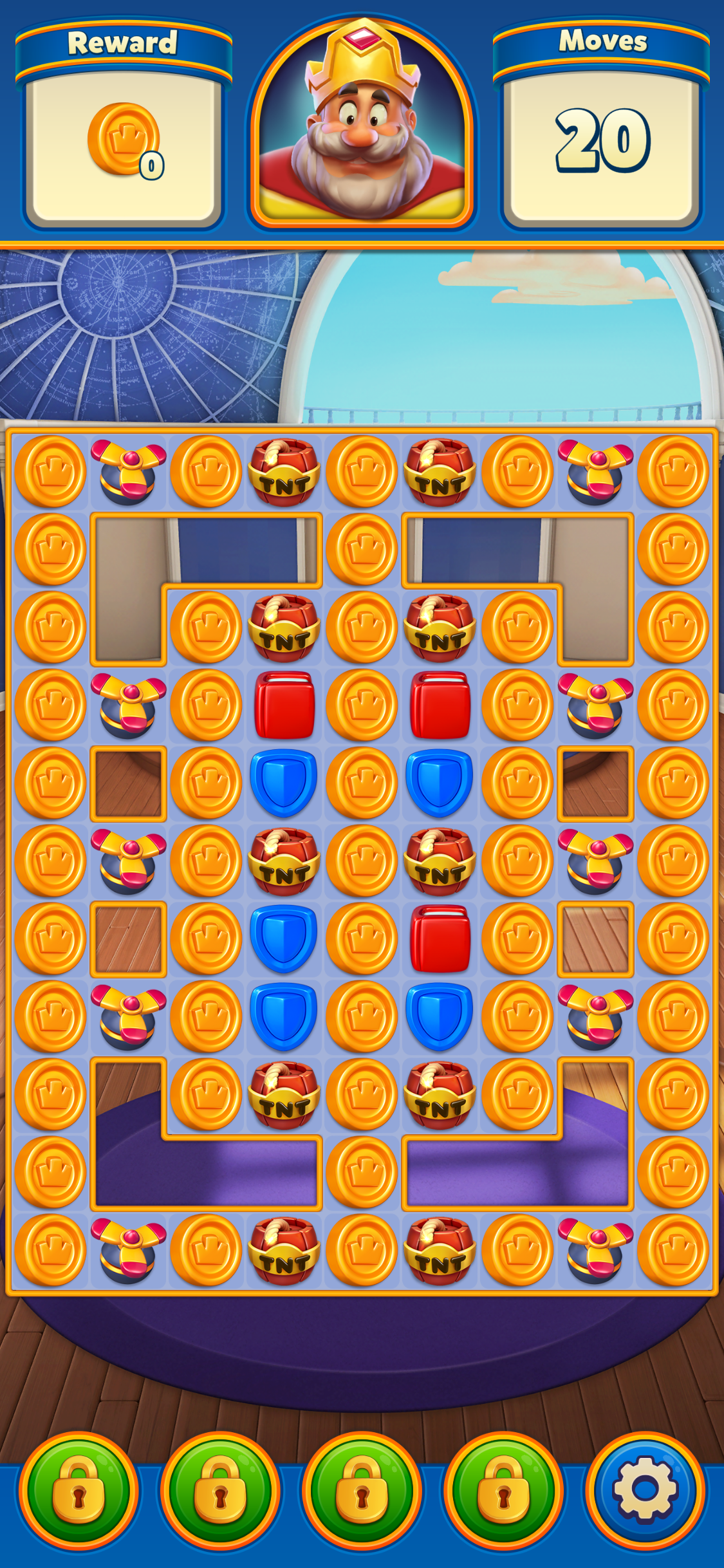
Level 1300, a bonus level

The game follows King Robert as he fixes his castle. It is a match-3 tile game, meaning that the player must usually complete levels by matching three (or more) of the same type of object in a line, similar to other games such as Homescapes, Candy Crush Saga, and the Bejeweled series. Other items that the player has to clear may be placed, such as Vases and Royal Eggs. Players must complete a level in a certain number of moves. If they fail, they lose one of their five lives, which are regenerated over time. Players that are having difficulty can use Boosters to help them. The two types are pre-game Boosters, which are randomly placed before the start of the level (these include Rockets, TNT, and Light Balls), and in-game Boosters, which are placed during the level (these include the Royal Hammer, Arrows, Cannons, and the Jester's Hat). There are over 12,400 levels as of November 2025, with new ones being added every two weeks.

While there is a level-based campaign, the Royal Match also offers Tournament, Challenge, and Quest modes, which are not required to progress. The game has an alliance system, Teams, in which level progression is determined as a team, and members must collaborate to obtain rewards. The game can also be played offline.

== Development and release ==
Royal Match was first made available only in Canada, Turkey, and the U.K. in a limited test for iOS and Android in July 2020. During the test, it received 1 million downloads and 200,000 daily average players. Royal Match was soft-launched in February or March 2021. In mid-2021, it reached the top 20 highest-grossing mobile games in the U.S., U.K., and Germany, reaching over 6 million users. By August 2021, it had 16 million downloads, making it the most popular in the U.S. at 28%. The U.K. and Germany followed at 7.7 and 7%, respectively. Despite its free-to-play approach, it gained $102 million in revenue from its first six months of operation. The U.S. accounted for $67 million of the total.

Dream Games, the developer and publisher, received $57.5 million in funding for the game in March 2021, making it the largest Series A for a Turkish startup company ever. Funding was led by Index Ventures, with Balderton Capital and Makers Fund also contributing. Then, a Series B round in June 2021 and a Series C round in January 2022 raised $155 million and $255 million, respectively. It aired its first TV commercial in January 2023, created by British advertising agency House 337. Royal Match additionally collaborated with Simon Cowell to release ads featuring him. Other celebrities that have done ads for the app include Amanda Holden, Rylan Clark, Olly Murs, Stacey Solomon, Dermot O'Leary and Tess Daly. Edwin Catmull, co-founder of Pixar and former President of Walt Disney Animation Studios, became a part of Dream Games by December 2023, working as a strategic advisor.

=== Developer ===
Dream Games logo

Dream Games is a Turkish video game company headquartered in Istanbul, Turkey. The company was founded in 2019 by Eren Sengul, Hakan Saglam, and three other partners. The company has expanded its presence with an additional office in London. As of 2024, Dream Games was the seventh-biggest mobile game developer in the world in terms of revenue. The company is the largest video game company in Turkey by revenue, followed by Peak Games.

== Reception ==
Laura Taranto of the blog Deconstructor of Fun compared Royal Match to Toon Blast and Homescapes, saying that the game has "the speed, fluidity, and palette of Toon Blast ... with the level diversity, power-ups and tap-to-activate from Homescapes". She states that power-ups are more effective than those in games developed by Playrix and King.

Erin Brereton of Common Sense Media gave the game 3/5 stars when reviewing the game's suitability for children, saying that the puzzles are entertaining but in-app purchases are prevalent.

Advertising for Royal Match was cited as deceptive by Sherwood News.

In August 2024 it was reported that Dream Games, the operator of Royal Match, was facing a proposed class action lawsuit that claims the online game constitutes illegal gambling under Washington state law.
