= Systematica Investments =

Geneva-based quantitative investment management firm

Systematica Investments Limited
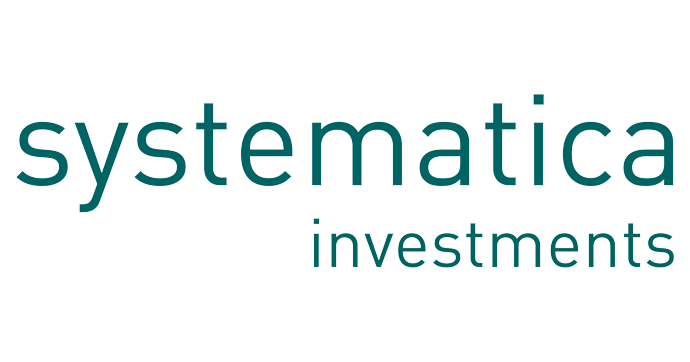
- Company type: Private
- Industry: Investment management
- Predecessor: BlueTrend
- Founded: January 2015; 10 years ago
- Founder: Leda Braga
- Headquarters: St Helier, Jersey
- Key people: Leda Braga (CEO)
- Products: Hedge funds Quantitative finance
- AUM: US$17 billion (2025)
- Owners: Affiliated Managers Group
- Website: www.systematica.com

Systematica Investments (Systematica) is a quantitative investment management firm. It is focused on a quantitative and systematic approach to investing.

The firm is headquartered in Jersey with additional offices in Geneva, London, New York, Pasadena, Singapore and Shanghai.

== Background ==
The origins of Systematica can be traced to BlueTrend, a computer-driven fund using a managed futures strategy that was part of BlueCrest Capital Management (BlueCrest). It was founded in 2004 by Brazilian-born Leda Braga. From 2004 to 2014, the fund averaged a return of over 11% a year and was one of BlueCrest's largest funds.

In late 2014, there were plans to spin off BlueTrend into a separate new firm by the end of the year. It would be named Systematica Investments and would be led by Braga to manage the BlueTrend branded funds. This came at the time BlueCrest was having performance issues and investors were withdrawing money from it. The spinoff would allow BlueTrend to control risk and to exclusively focus on serving its investors.

In January 2015, BlueTrend was spun off as Systematica Investments which would use computers to mine large data sets to find investment opportunities along with algorithmic trading techniques. It would be controlled by Braga and her team although BlueCrest would still have a 49% stake in it. At the time, the firm had around $8.4 billion in assets under management (AUM) and 100 employees. Its flagship fund was named BlueTrend.

In November 2015, BlueCrest sold of the majority of its stake in Systematica to Affiliated Managers Group (AMG). AMG's then-CEO, Sean Healey stated the deal was agreed on after he met with Michael Platt at 5 Hertford Street for dinner in Spring that year. A key recommendation came from Andrew Feldstein who had previously worked at BlueCrest and lafter founded his own firm BlueMountain Capital Management. At this time Systematica's AUM figures had supposed those of BlueCrest.

In November 2017, Systematica received a $120 million backing from Old Mutual Global Investors to launch a UCITS product in Europe named Systematica Alternative Risk Premia (SARP) which was aimed at retail investors.

In January 2022, Braga and AMG acquired BlueCrest's remaining stake in Systematica effectively ending Systematica's ties to BlueCrest.

From 2022 to 2024, Systematica recruited a team of “feature engineers” to introduce and format alternative data sources for its investment strategies.

In April 2025, Systematica suffered from significant losses due to the China–United States trade war. Its flagship fund BlueTrend was down 18.8% that year.
