= Igor Bukhman =

Russian-born British-Israeli entrepreneur (born 1982)

- Игорь Бухман
- Born: 29 March 1982 (age 44); Vologda, Soviet Union
- Education: Vologda State Pedagogical Institute
- Relatives: Dmitry Bukhman

Igor Bukhman (Russian: Игорь Бухман; born 29 March 1982) is a Russian-born British entrepreneur best known for founding online gaming company Playrix with his brother Dmitry Bukhman in 2004.

== Biography ==
Igor and his brother Dmitry Bukhman were born in Vologda to Jewish parents. Since he was a kid, Igor was engaged in programming. In 1999, Igor Bukhman was enrolled on the Faculty of Applied Mathematics at the Vologda State Pedagogical Institute. In 2001, together with his brother, they started developing online games. The same year, they published their first game Discovera. The brothers priced it at $15, uploaded it to 200 app directories, and made $60 in the first month.

== Playrix ==
Together, Igor and Dmitry founded Playrix in 2004, which is best known for its mobile-app games such as Homescapes and Fishdom. By that time, they had released three games and around 30 screensavers; by 2007, the number of games increased to 16, and the company's monthly income constituted around $300,000. Soon the company released such games as Homescapes, Gardenscapes, Fishdom, and Township.

In 2018, the brothers personally invested in video and social network games developer Nexters Global and in Belarusian Vizor Games. In February 2019, there was some information about the sale of Playrix to Chinese gaming companies for $3 billion, but the rumors were not confirmed. In 2019, Playrix bought the Armenian and Serbian studios Plexonic and Eipix Entertainment, respectively. In 2021 and 2022, Igor Bukhman was a member of Nexters' Board of Directors; in April 2023, he was appointed a non-executive director of the company. In October 2022, the company announced the closure of its offices and development operations in Russia and Belarus due to the invasion of Ukraine. In 2023, the company employed more than 3,000 people around the world. In June 2023, analytics company Data.ai (formerly App Annie) ranked Playrix seventh in the global ranking of mobile publishers by annual revenue, with the company in first place in EMEA. “Within five years, we are seeking to join the same league as Activision Blizzard or NetEase Inc., but in the European region,” said Igor, without specifying a revenue target.

== Wealth ==
Igor Bukhman entered Forbes ranking of the richest entrepreneurs in the world in 2020 with a fortune of $3.1 billion. In April 2023, Forbes estimated Bukhman's assets at $7 billion: he ranked 332nd in the world, and 6th in the list of wealthiest Israelis. In October 2021, the Bukhmans launched the Rix Capital family fund. In 2023, the investment company, with $4 billion of the brothers' personal funds under management, opened a permanent office in London. In 2023, he ranks 23rd in the Russian Billionaires ranking and 332nd in the World's Billionaires ranking with a net worth of $6.9B. As of November 2024, he was ranked #493 on the Bloomberg Billionaires Index, with US$6.27 billion.

In 2025, he was included in The Sunday Times' 40 Under 40 Rich list.

== Philanthropy ==
The Bukhman Foundation was established in 2023 by Anastasia and Igor Bukhman. In 2025, it was announced that the foundation would make a £100 million pledge to fund groundbreaking research that will accelerate progress towards new treatments and a cure for type 1 diabetes. That same year, the Bukhman Foundation donated $1 million to the National Portrait Gallery.

== Private life ==
He is married and has four children. In 2014, Igor Bukhman moved to Dublin. In 2016, he acquired Israeli citizenship. Since 2020 he has lived in London and in 2025 received British citizenship
