= Anastasia Bukhman =

British art collector and philanthropist

- Born: July 1982 (age 44); Vologda, Russian SFSR, Soviet Union
- Citizenship: Russia; United Kingdom (from 2025)
- Education: Vologda State Technical University; Sotheby's Institute of Art
- Occupations: Art collector, philanthropist, entrepreneur
- Known for: Bukhman Foundation
- Spouse: Igor Bukhman
- Children: 4

Anastasia Bukhman (born July 1982) is a Russian-born British philanthropist, art collector and entrepreneur based in London. With her husband, the technology entrepreneur Igor Bukhman, she is a trustee and Chairman of the Bukhman Foundation, a charitable organisation that funds type 1 diabetes research and the arts.

Bukhman has assembled a collection of contemporary art and was included in the ARTnews Top 200 Collectors list in 2025. Through the Bukhman Foundation she has funded acquisitions and programmes at British cultural institutions including the National Portrait Gallery, Tate and the South London Gallery, where she serves as a trustee. In May 2025 the foundation pledged £100 million towards type 1 diabetes research.

== Early life and education ==
Bukhman was born in July 1982 in Vologda, a city in north-western Russia, where she was raised; her husband is from the same city. She has said that she had little exposure to art in childhood. She attended Vologda State Technical University (now Vologda State University).

Bukhman and her husband left Russia in 2014, living first in Dublin, Ireland, and then in Israel, before settling in London around 2020. After moving to Britain she studied art history at the Sotheby's Institute of Art. The couple have four children and live in London.

== Business interests ==
Bukhman is the chair and a director of the Creative Restaurant Group, a London-based hospitality company whose restaurants include Igni, a former Michelin-starred restaurant. In 2025 the group appointed a new managing director.

== Art collection ==
Bukhman collects post-war and contemporary art and, as of 2026, was reported to own about 200 works. Her collection has been reported to include works by Gerhard Richter, Mike Kelley, Louise Bourgeois, Damien Hirst and Maurizio Cattelan, as well as Tracey Emin, Antony Gormley, Joseph Kosuth and Félix González-Torres, one of whose hanging light-bulb works hangs in the couple's home. She has also acquired work by emerging artists such as Daisy Parris and Ro Robertson.

Bukhman has said that "auction records and results have very little to do with art today", and has described focusing her support of the art world on institutions and artists rather than on acquisitions. In 2026 she helped to stage the Austrian pavilion of Florentina Holzinger at the Venice Biennale. Her collecting was also covered in the Russian financial press.

== Philanthropy ==
Bukhman is the Chair and a Trustee of the Bukhman Foundation, a London-based charitable foundation established in 2023. The foundation's stated objectives are funding type 1 diabetes research, providing educational bursaries, and supporting the arts and culture.

=== Type 1 diabetes ===
The Bukhmans' focus on type 1 diabetes stems from a family connection: both of their fathers had the condition, and their eldest daughter, was diagnosed at the age of three in 2014. Bukhman spent about three weeks in hospital after the diagnosis, learning to manage her daughter's care.

In May 2025 the foundation pledged £100 million, to be spread over ten years, towards research into type 1 diabetes. The pledge included funding for a Diabetes UK-backed programme at the University of Cambridge examining how common viral infections may trigger the condition in genetically at-risk children. In September 2025 the foundation made a £10 million donation to the University of Oxford to establish the Bukhman Centre for Research Excellence in Type 1 Diabetes, funding academic posts and scholarships.

=== Arts and culture ===
Through the Bukhman Foundation, Bukhman has funded acquisitions and programmes at British cultural institutions. In 2024 the foundation established a £1 million contemporary-art acquisitions fund, "Collecting the Now", at the National Portrait Gallery in London, used to acquire portraits of living people. The foundation has also supported Tate's Art Now programme, the South London Gallery's Art Block programme, and exhibitions at Turner Contemporary, Matt's Gallery and the Hayward Gallery.

In 2025 the foundation committed £3 million over three years to the New Curators training programme, based at the South London Gallery and co-directed by Kerryn Greenberg and Mark Godfrey. Bukhman has served as a trustee of the South London Gallery since 2023 and sits on its development committee.

== Recognition ==
Bukhman was named on the ARTnews Top 200 Collectors list in 2025, in the British Vogue "Vogue 25" list of women defining Britain in 2025, and, with her husband, on The Sunday Times Alternative Honours List of 2025 for their philanthropic work.
