= Hero Wars =

Hero Wars may refer to:

- HeroQuest (role-playing game), also known as Hero Wars
- Hero Wars (video game), 2016 mobile game by Nexters
