= Henry Moser =

British billionaire businessman (born 1949)

- Born: September 1949
- Occupation: Financier

Henry Moser (born September 1949) is a British billionaire businessman.

Moser is the founder, owner and CEO of Together Financial Services Limited, a UK mortgage lender.

== Early life ==
Moser grew up in Bury, Lancashire, left school at 16 and became a car salesman.

== Career ==
In 1974, Moser co-founded Jerrold Holdings, a mortgage lender, with Barrie Pollock.

In 2012, Moser was fined £70,000, and Cheshire Mortgage Corporation (CMCL, part of his Blemain Group) was fined £1.225m by the UK's Financial Services Authority for unfair practices. As part of the process, Moser agreed to step down as CEO within six months. The FSA described the failings of Moser and CMCL as "serious".

In 2006, he sold a 30% stake in Together to Barclays Private Equity for £113.5 million, and later bought it back.

In February 2026, Henry Moser was listed on the Sunday Times Tax list with an estimated £62 million.

== Net worth ==
According to The Sunday Times Rich List in 2024 his net worth was estimated at £1.918billion.
