= Fishdom H2O: Hidden Odyssey =

2009 video game

- Cover art
- Developer: Playrix
- Publishers: Playrix, Cypronia (3DS)
- Series: Fishdom
- Platforms: Nintendo 3DS; Microsoft Windows; Macintosh
- Release: Microsoft Windows: WW: April 10, 2009; Nintendo 3DS: WW: July 4, 2013

Fishdom H2O: Hidden Odyssey is a hidden treasure hunting game released on April 10, 2009 by Russian studio Playrix. The game was originally released for Microsoft Windows and Macintosh computers, but was later released for the Nintendo 3DS on July 4, 2013 in North America. The game has the player go through the game as Jennifer (Jennie), an intern at a marine biology institute. Her grandpa, called Grandpa Jack throughout the game, says that she should create fish tanks with unique fish and decorations over her summer break in order to impress her boss, Old Barny. The game then has you dive for hidden treasure in various levels. The items the player must find are taken off of a list given to the player by Grandpa Jack. When all of the items are found, the player is rewarded with various amounts of money based on the speed of the items found and how many hints were used. The money you gain from diving can be used to purchase fish, decorations, and equipment (filter for the tank, fish vitamins, etc.).

== Gameplay ==
The player must dive for treasure in 5 different levels and retrieve 12 items on a list given to them by Grandpa Jack. The game has over 1000 items, though sometimes different lists will have the same items. When all 12 items on the list have been found the player is rewarded with money. The amount of money depends on the speed that all of the items were found and how many hints were used. The money that the player receives is used to buy fish, decorations, and equipment. The aquarium has three meters, fish, beauty, and comfort. Fish fill up the fish meter, decorations fill up the beauty meter, and equipment fill up the comfort meter. Once all three meters have been filled, the player is rewarded a trophy for that tank. Then, the meters reset, and you have to buy even more items, fish, and equipment to fill them back to 100%. In order to fill the fish meter the second time, the player must buy at least 10 fish, though more expensive fish fill up the meter faster. To fill the beauty meter to 100%, the player must buy all decorations available for that tank, and the same goes for the comfort meter. Each tank can only have one of each decoration and piece of equipment, though you can have unlimited fish. There are three tanks in the game, Hawaiian Vacation, Jolly Roger, and Wild West. Each aquarium has its own set of decorations and fish, though equipment remains the same. In addition to the classic treasure hunt mode, when the player dives for treasure, they will sometimes randomly be assigned a speed challenge mode, where faster finding means much more money, a collection mode where the player must find 10 of the same item in a time limit, and gold rush, where the player gets as money gold items as possible. Gold rush rewards much more money than the other modes, but is the most uncommon mode to get.
