= Hidden Expedition =

- Genre: Casual game
- Developers: Big Fish Games (1-5); Flood Light Games (5); Eipix Entertainment (6-18); Domini Games (19-present)
- Publisher: Big Fish Games
- Platforms: Windows, Mac OS X, iOS, Kindle, Android
- First release: Hidden Expedition: Titanic; July 22, 2006
- Latest release: Hidden Expedition: A King's Line; June 17, 2021

Hidden Expedition is a series of single-player hidden object casual games developed by the internal studios of Big Fish Games for the first five installments (using Big Fish Games Framework as the engine, and with the help of Flood Light Games in the 5th game), and by Eipix Entertainment for all subsequent installments. The three latest installments are developed by Domini Games. As of 2021, a total of twenty-one games in the series have been released. The Hidden Expedition series marks the second major hidden object game brand from Big Fish Games. The second game in the series, Hidden Expedition: Everest, would go on to be the first game Big Fish released on the iPhone.

== Games ==
| Title | Released | Platform |
Big Fish Games
| Hidden Expedition: Titanic | July 19, 2006 | Windows, MacOS, iOS |
| Hidden Expedition: Everest | June 1, 2007 | Windows, MacOS, iOS |
| Hidden Expedition: Amazon | June 20, 2008 | Windows, MacOS, iOS, Amazon Kindle, Android |
| Hidden Expedition: Devil's Triangle | October 24, 2009 | Windows, MacOS, iOS, Amazon Kindle, Android |
Big Fish Games, Flood Light Games
| Hidden Expedition: The Uncharted Islands | August 14, 2011 | Windows, MacOS |
Eipix Entertainment
| Hidden Expedition: Smithsonian Hope Diamond | December 20, 2013 | Windows, MacOS, iOS, Android |
| Hidden Expedition: The Crown of Solomon | July 14, 2014 | Windows, MacOS, iOS, Android |
| Hidden Expedition: Smithsonian Castle | December 24, 2014 | Windows, MacOS, iOS, Android |
| Hidden Expedition: Dawn of Prosperity | August 27, 2015 | Windows, MacOS, iOS, Android |
| Hidden Expedition: Fountain of Youth | January 7, 2016 | Windows, MacOS, iOS, Android |
| Hidden Expedition: Midgard's End | June 2, 2016. | Windows, MacOS, iOS, Android |
| Hidden Expedition: The Eternal Emperor | September 2, 2016 | Windows, MacOS, iOS, Android |
| Hidden Expedition: The Lost Paradise | December 22, 2016 | Windows, MacOS, iOS |
| Hidden Expedition: The Pearl of Discord | April 8, 2017 | Windows, MacOS, iOS |
| Hidden Expedition: The Curse of Mithridates | October 28, 2017 | Windows, MacOS |
| Hidden Expedition: The Golden Secret | February 10, 2018 | Windows, MacOS |
| Hidden Expedition: The Altar of Lies | July 21, 2018 | Windows, MacOS |
| Hidden Expedition: Neptune's Gift | April 26, 2019 | Windows, MacOS |
Domini Games
| Hidden Expedition: The Price of Paradise | July 25, 2020 | Windows, MacOS, iOS |
| Hidden Expedition: Reign of Flames | November 19, 2020 | Windows, MacOS, iOS |
| Hidden Expedition: A King's Line | June 17, 2021 | Windows, MacOS, iOS |

=== Big Fish Games (2006—2009) ===
==== Hidden Expedition: Titanic ====
Hidden Expedition: Titanic was released on July 22, 2006, for Windows. It was released to iOS for the iPhone and iPod Touch on August 1, 2009.

In this game, the player takes on the role of a treasure hunter working for the Hidden Expedition Adventure League (H.E.A.L.) to investigate the wreckage of the ocean liner Titanic. The Titanic Museum Foundation has discovered a rare artifact - the Queen's jeweled crown - was on the ship and have hired H.E.A.L. to retrieve it, as well as any other pieces that may be of value to the museum. Players have a limited time to search hidden object scenes in each area of the ship, or their oxygen will run out.

The game's music was composed by Jean-Marc Lederman.

According to independent tracking site game-sales-charts.com, following its release on July 22, 2006, Hidden Expedition: Titanic climbed into the top 10 on nearly every major casual game distribution site. Moreover, it held the #1 sales spot on 11 of these sites.

==== Hidden Expedition: Everest ====
Hidden Expedition: Everest was released on June 1, 2007. As a member of the Hidden Expedition Club, the player is trying to reach the top of Mount Everest ahead of three competing expedition clubs. But first the player must find a mysterious adventurer who can help them find a hidden passage up. This leads the player through a variety of locations in Latin America, Europe, and Asia before ending at Mount Everest.

The game features a likeness of world-famous mountaineer and Mount Everest climber, Ed Viesturs, as an assistant who provides players with guidance on various locations. Viesturs was involved in the actual development of the game, along with National Geographic Ventures, which worked with Big Fish Games to incorporate some of "National Geographic's rich repository of video, photos, stories and other editorial from previous Everest expeditions and from National Geographic's incredible collection of exploration and adventure content" into the gameplay.

An iOS version was released on May 14, 2009. This marked Big Fish Game's first foray into making games targeted at the then-emerging iPhone market. Lead Artist Shawn Wood and Lead Programmer Tyson Chihaya were given the job of remaking the game for the iOS platform. Due to the series' popularity and it being Big Fish's first iPhone game, Woods noted they "felt a bit of pressure to get it right." The team started by first playing through the PC version to determine what elements would need to be changed due to the differences in PC gaming and the iPhone, as well as to see what improvements could be made. They then had to deconstruct the original code and rewrite it, as the PC games were made with Adobe Flash and Adobe Director, while the iOS game would need to be written in Objective-C.

The significantly smaller screen of an iPhone resulted in the team having to redesign the buttons and hidden object scenes. Many of the original objects were too small to find once the pictures were rescaled to the 320x480 size, resulting in the scenes and some mini-games having to be changed. The team also leveraged the iPhone touch controls and zooming capabilities to render the scenes into a usable form.

According to Big Fish, upon release the game quickly rose to the top of the iPhone sales charts and was rated 4 out of 5 stars by users. With the success of this game, Big Fish was committed to continuing to release games for the iPhone and iOS.

==== Hidden Expedition: Amazon ====
Hidden Expedition: Amazon was released on June 20, 2008, for Windows. Two years after, on April 2, 2010, a version was released for iOS devices, including the iPad, iPhone, and iPod Touch. This version adds a multiplayer mode, allowing two players to compete against each other in a split-screen mode and integrates OpenFeint's award system. The vice president of Big Fish Games Studios, Patrict Wylie, stated that these changes "transforms the device into a modern board game". A black-and-white version for Amazon Kindle followed on July 28, 2011. It is also available on Kindle.

In this entry in the series, the player assumes the role of a member of the Hidden Expedition Adventure Club who goes to look for some folks who went missing in the Amazon, including their friend and a biologist. The game's music and sound effects were produced by SomaTone Interactive Audio.

The iOS versions of the game were selected as a free "Pick of the Week" by Starbucks on October 30, 2012, meaning Starbucks gave away free cards that could be used to purchase the game in the Apple App Store.

==== Hidden Expedition: Devil's Triangle ====
Hidden Expedition: Devil's Triangle was released on October 24, 2009. As the leader of the Hidden Expedition Adventure Team (H.E.A.T.), the player must search for a pilot who disappeared in the Bermuda Triangle.

=== Big Fish Games, Flood Light Games (2011) ===
==== Hidden Expedition: The Uncharted Islands ====
Hidden Expedition: The Uncharted Islands is the fifth game in the series, developed with Flood Light Games. The Collector's Edition of the game was released on PC on August 14, 2011, with a Mac edition following. A sequel to Devil's Triangle, the game's main character attempts to leave the islands only to find themselves crash-landing on a previously undiscovered set of islands in the Bermuda Triangle. The player must search for a dangerous pirate who is also trying to escape the islands with stolen treasure.

A Standard Edition of the game was released later in 2011. The Collector's Edition differs from the regular version in that it includes extra gameplay, a built-in strategy guide, concept art, and computer wallpapers.

=== Eipix Entertainment (2013—2019) ===
==== Hidden Expedition: Smithsonian Hope Diamond ====
Hidden Expedition: Smithsonian Hope Diamond Collector's Edition was released on December 20, 2013, for PC and Mac (later also released for iOS and Android), and is the sixth game in the series. Players take on the role of a new recruit for the Hidden Expedition League of Preservation (H.E.L.P.) team who is tasked with finding missing shards of the Hope Diamond before a gang of thieves do. This is the first game of the series to be developed by Eipix Entertainment, who have been put in charge of developing all future sequels. In creating the game, Big Fish and Eipix were aided by the National Museum of Natural History, a part of the Smithsonian Institution. According to Big Fish Games, this was the first such video game collaboration for the Smithsonian.

==== Hidden Expedition: The Crown of Solomon ====
Hidden Expedition: The Crown of Solomon is the seventh game in the series. The Collector's Edition of the game was released on July 14, 2014, for PC and Mac, and later also made available for iOS and Android. The expedition continues as the player tracks down the fragments of King Solomon's crown and foils a madman's plot. In order to piece together the most powerful crown in history the player must travel around the world and prevent the fragments from falling into the wrong hands.

==== Hidden Expedition: Smithsonian Castle ====
Hidden Expedition: Smithsonian Castle is the eighth game in the series. The Collector's Edition of the game was released on December 24, 2014, for PC and Mac, and later also made available for iOS and Android. It is the second game in the series developed in cooperation with the Smithsonian Institution. The adventure takes us back to the Smithsonian to uncover a mystery that dates all the way back to the founding of the institution. The player will have to dig deep into the Smithsonian's history to find the answers to the unusual and mysterious events of the present.

==== Hidden Expedition: Dawn of Prosperity ====
Hidden Expedition: Dawn of Prosperity is the ninth game in the series. The Collector's Edition was released on August 27, 2015, for PC and Mac. A series of mysterious earthquakes in Montana, aligned with unusual activity in a long-abandoned science facility nearby, forces H.E.L.P. to send its operatives to investigate the events. It soon turns out that the suspicious activity is not coincidental, but a part of a mastermind's sinister plans threatening to bring devastation on a grand scale.

==== Hidden Expedition: Fountain of Youth ====
Hidden Expedition: Fountain of Youth is the tenth game in the series. The Collector's Edition of the game was released on January 7, 2016, for PC and Mac. The player is on a mission to discover what happened with their H.E.L.P. colleagues who went to oversee a restoration of an archaeological site of Sigiriya, Sri Lanka. What looked like a case of jammed communication turns out to be an extraordinary adventure.

==== Hidden Expedition: Midgard's End ====
Hidden Expedition: Midgard's End is the eleventh game in the series. The Collector's Edition was released on June 2, 2016.

==== Hidden Expedition: The Eternal Emperor ====
Hidden Expedition: The Eternal Emperor is the twelfth game in the series. The Collector's Edition was released on September 2, 2016. A dig site uncovers the tomb of Emperor Qin Shi Huang, founder of the Qin dynasty and first emperor of a unified China. H.E.L.P. sends the player and their trusty partner Sam to watch over the exploration of Qin's tomb and ensure that all who enter come out alive. Things turn sour in the tomb, however, and what was to be a fun adventure of the final resting place of Qin quickly turns into a chase through Asia to stop a madman from world domination- just a regular Tuesday for a seasoned H.E.L.P. agent.

==== Hidden Expedition: The Lost Paradise ====
Hidden Expedition: The Lost Paradise is the thirteenth game in the series. The demo version was released on October 1, 2016. Collector's Edition version was released on December 22, 2016.

==== Hidden Expedition: The Pearl of Discord ====
Hidden Expedition: The Pearl of Discord is the fourteenth game in the series. The game was released on April 8, 2017

==== Hidden Expedition: The Curse of Mithridates ====
Hidden Expedition: The Curse of Mithridates is the 15th game in the series. The game was released on October 28, 2017.

==== Hidden Expedition: The Golden Secret ====
Hidden Expedition: The Golden Secret is the 16th game in the series. The game was released on February 10, 2018.

==== Hidden Expedition: The Altar of Lies ====
Hidden Expedition: The Altar of Lies is the 17th game in this series. The game was released on July 21, 2018.

==== Hidden Expedition: Neptune's Gift ====
Hidden Expedition: Neptune's Gift is the 18th game in the series. The Collector's Edition version was released on April 26, 2019.

=== Domini Games (2020—present) ===
==== Hidden Expedition: The Price of Paradise ====
Hidden Expedition: The Price of Paradise is the 19th game of the series. This is the first game of the series developed by Domini Games, and has one of the lowest user ratings and sales of any game in the series. The game was released on July 25, 2020.

==== Hidden Expedition: Reign of Flames ====
Hidden Expedition: Reign of Flames is the 20th game of the series, it was released on November 19, 2020.

==== Hidden Expedition: A King's Line ====
Hidden Expedition: A King's Line is the 21st game of the series, it was released on June 17, 2021.

== Acronyms used ==
In the series, several fictional organisations are mentioned, all of which use acronyms that contain the letters "H" and "E" (which stand for "Hidden Expedition" in all instances).

1. H.E.A.L. - Hidden Expedition Adventure League (in Hidden Expedition: Titanic, Hidden Expedition: Everest & Hidden Expedition: Amazon)
2. H.E.A.T. - Hidden Expedition Adventure Team (in Hidden Expedition: Devil's Triangle & Hidden Expedition: The Uncharted Islands)
3. H.E.L.P. - Hidden Expedition League of Preservation (from Hidden Expedition: Smithsonian Hope Diamond, to the present games)

== Merchandise ==
In August 2011, Big Fish Games released 1000 piece jigsaw puzzles for the first three games in the series. The puzzles were made in partnership with the puzzle company Ceaco.
