= Artemis (fund managers) =

UK-based investment management firm

Artemis Investment Management LLP
- Type: Limited Liability Partnership
- Industry: Investment management
- Founded: 1997; 29 years ago
- Headquarters: London, United Kingdom
- Key people: Mark Murray (Senior Partner); John Dodd (Management committee chairman); Jonathan Loukes (Chief financial officer); Lesley Cairney (Chief operating officer)
- Products: Investment trusts, venture capital trusts
- Website: www.artemisfunds.com

Artemis and its subsidiary Artemis Fund Managers are a UK–based fund management business, offering a range of funds which invest in the UK, Europe, the US and the rest of the world.

Artemis' client investments are spread across a range of funds, two investment trusts, a venture capital trust, and both pooled and segregated institutional portfolios.

== History ==
Artemis was founded in 1997. In 2002 a majority stake was acquired by ABN AMRO; that stake subsequently passed to Fortis. Following a management buyout in 2010, Artemis is owned by Affiliated Managers Group (AMG) and the Artemis partners. This is a financial partnership: AMG does not get involved in the day-to-day running of the business.

Artemis is a Limited Liability Partnership (LLP) and has 29 partners, comprising fund managers and other key individuals at the firm. The founders have said that one of the key determinants in long-term success is the stability of the investment team.

== Operations ==
The firm's clients include retail investors, financial advisers and institutional investors such as pension funds and financial institutions. The firm has offices in Edinburgh and London and, as at 30 September 2020, it managed £23.1 billion of assets.

== Headquarters ==
The firm's offices are at Cassini House, 57 St James's Street, London SW1A 1LD and 6th floor, Exchange Plaza, 50 Lothian Road, Edinburgh EH3 9BY
