= Blue Tea Games =

Video game developer

Blue Tea Games is a casual computer games development studio, founded on January 24, 2003 by Steven Zhao.

== Blue Tea Games ==
Blue Tea Games's works are usually released through digital and online casual game distributor Big Fish Games where the company enjoys critical acclaim and success through their Dark Parables series.

A typical Dark Parables game is a puzzle- and FROG-driven retelling of a popular fairy tale. A FROG (Fragmented Object Game) involves searching for fragmented parts of an object within a scene. Once all are located, the fragments self-assemble into a working object that can be used in a puzzle elsewhere in accordance with the narrative story.

Blue Tea Games launched a new series Macabre Mysteries in 2011 with a focus on the supernatural/horror aspect of an urban mystery. The company's biggest commercial success in 2007 was Forgotten Riddles: The Mayan Princess, which reached #1 on the Big Fish Games portal.

== Games ==
- Ballmaster (2002)
- HeliumMan-X (2002)
- Meeklits (2003)
- Ballmaster 2 (2003)
- Cactus Bruce and the Corporate Monkeys (2004)
- Teddy Tavern: A Culinary Adventure (2007)
- Forgotten Lands: First Colony (2008)
- Macabre Mysteries: Curse of the Nightingale (2011)
- Fabled Legends: The Dark Piper (2012)
- Enchantia: Wrath of the Phoenix Queen (2013)
- Cursery: The Crooked Man and The Crooked Cat (2013)
- Mavenfall (2015)

=== Forgotten Riddles series ===
The Mayan Princess is a HOG (hidden object game) that features a story, set during the 16th century, around the fate of a Mayan royal family.

As part of game play, a list of items for the player to find is usually presented in form of a riddle. For example, "You'll find I mark time with no tick and no tock; It's with sand that I mimic a modern day clock". The player will eventually realise it refers to an hourglass, which can be taken as a clue to advance through the game.

- Forgotten Riddles: The Mayan Princess (2007)
- Forgotten Riddles: The Moonlight Sonatas (2008)

=== Dark Parables series ===
Dark Parables is a franchise of several games involving fairy tales. Only the first seven games in the series are created by Blue Tea Games. The franchise was then further developed by Eipix Entertainment. During the production of Return of the Salt Princess Blue Tea Games returned to the series. Starting with Rise of the Snow Queen, the series included small bonus games that expanded the lore.

- Dark Parables: Curse of Briar Rose (2010)
- Dark Parables: The Exiled Prince (2011)
- Dark Parables: Rise of the Snow Queen (2011)
- Dark Parables: The Red Riding Hood Sisters (2012)
- Dark Parables: The Final Cinderella (2013)
- Dark Parables: Jack and the Sky Kingdom (2014)
- Dark Parables: Ballad of Rapunzel (2014)
- Dark Parables: The Little Mermaid and the Purple Tide (2014)
- Dark Parables: Queen of Sands (2015)
- Dark Parables: Goldilocks and the Fallen Star (2016)
- Dark Parables: The Swan Princess and the Dire Tree (2016)
- Dark Parables: The Thief and the Tinderbox (2016)
- Dark Parables: Requiem for the Forgotten Shadow (2017)
- Dark Parables: Return of the Salt Princess (2018)
- Dark Parables: The Match Girl's Lost Paradise (2018)
- Dark Parables: Portrait of the Stained Princess (2019)

=== Enlightenus series ===
- Enlightenus (2009)
- Enlightenus II: The Timeless Tower (2010)
