= Affiliated Managers Group =

American Investment Company

Affiliated Managers Group, Inc.
- Type: Public
- Traded as: NYSE: AMG; S&P 400 component
- Industry: Financial services
- Headquarters: West Palm Beach, Florida, U.S.
- Area served: Worldwide
- Key people: Dwight D. Churchill (chairman); Jay C. Horgen (CEO); Thomas Wojcik (CFO)
- Products: Financial investments
- Revenue: ▲US$2.33 billion (2022)
- Operating income: ▲US$771 million (2022)
- Net income: ▼US$1.15 billion (2022)
- AUM: ▼US$651 billion (2022 Q4)
- Total assets: ▲US$8.881 billion (2022)
- Total equity: US$4.176 billion (2022)
- Number of employees: 250 (2022)
- Website: amg.com

Affiliated Managers Group, Inc. (AMG) is an American financial services firm founded in 1993 and headquartered in West Palm Beach, Florida. The company's stock trades on the New York Stock Exchange under the symbol AMG, and is listed on the S&P 400 for mid-size American firms.

AMG operates as a strategic partner to independent investment management firms globally, with equity stakes in a number of partner-owned traditional investment managers, hedge funds, and specialized private equity firms which it calls “Affiliates.” The company has principal offices in West Palm Beach, Florida; Prides Crossing, Massachusetts; Stamford, Connecticut; and London, United Kingdom. The company was founded in December 1993 by William J. Nutt in Boston, Massachusetts, as a privately owned company with initial backing from TA Associates; its initial public offering on the New York Stock Exchange occurred in November 1997. Today, AMG's Affiliates manage $651 billion in assets in aggregate.

AMG's strategy is to generate value by investing in an array of independent firms and supporting their long-term growth, through an approach in which significant equity ownership is retained by the management partners of each Affiliate, and each Affiliate operates and invests autonomously from AMG and from other Affiliates. The Affiliate principals’ ‘skin in the game’ incentivizes them to maximize long-term value creation, and their retained investment independence preserves the entrepreneurial cultures of each Affiliate firm.

== History ==
Logo until 2023

In 1993, AMG was founded by William Nutt.

In 1997, AMG invested in Tweedy, Browne and completed its initial public offering, listing on the New York Stock Exchange.

In 2004, AMG established a U.S. retail platform which would enable its Affiliates to manufacture, market, and distribute products to the U.S. wealth marketplace. AMG also made a minority investment in AQR, a quantitative investment manager and hedge fund firm, its first investment in an alternative investment firm, and its first minority investment.

In 2005, Sean M. Healey was named chief executive officer.

In 2007, AMG opened its first non-U.S. institutional distribution office in Sydney, Australia, to provide sales and marketing services to institutional clients in Australia and New Zealand. Today, AMG operates distribution capabilities serving the Asia, Australia, Europe / U.K., and Middle East marketplaces.

In 2009, AMG announced investments in Harding Loevner and Gannett Welsh & Kotler.

In 2010, AMG acquired a majority stake in Pantheon Ventures. The private equity company was AMG's largest investment to date. AMG also invested in Artemis Investment Management.

In 2016, AMG made an investment in leading technology-driven liquid alternative firm Systematica Investments.

In 2018, after being diagnosed with ALS, Sean Healey stepped down from his position as chief executive officer. He died in May 2020. Nathaniel Dalton, previously president and chief operating officer, succeeded him.

In 2019, Jay Horgen succeeded Dalton as president and chief executive officer. Horgen joined AMG in 2007 and previously served as chief financial officer, as well as executive vice president, focusing on investments in new AMG Affiliates.

In 2021, AMG invested in four companies, including Parnassus Investments, the largest ESG-dedicated fund manager in the U.S.

In 2022, AMG increased its investment in Systematica Investments, a quantitative and systematic investment firm.

Other Information

AMG is known for its research, on independent firms' advantages in consistently generating excess returns.

The company is also known for its commitment to corporate citizenship and community engagement. AMG was a founding donor to the Sean M. Healey and AMG Center for ALS at Massachusetts General Hospital, and continues to support the Center with fundraising and charitable events.
