= William Reeves (finance) =

American businessman and hedge fund founder

- Born: William Huntington Reeves; 1963 or 1964 (age 61–62)
- Education: Yale University; New York University
- Known for: Co-founder of BlueCrest Capital Management hedge fund

William Huntington Reeves (born 1963/64) is an American businessman and the co-founder of the hedge fund, BlueCrest Capital Management.

== Early life ==
Reeves has a BA in English from Yale University, and an MA in Philosophy from New York University.

== Career ==
Reeves is a former trader of JP Morgan and Chase Company. In 2000, he co-founded BlueCrest Capital Management with Michael Platt.

In 2009, he and Platt owned 75% of BlueCrest. In 2010, he was reported to have a net worth of £375 million.
