= Marco Streng =

German businessman, and the chief executive officer and co-founder of the Genesis Group

- Born: Marco Andreas Streng; 1989 (age 36–37)
- Education: LMU Munich
- Occupation: Chief Executive Officer
- Known for: Cryptocurrency mining
- Board member of: Genesis Group; Genesis Mining

Marco Andreas Streng (born 1989) is the chief executive officer and cofounder of Genesis Group, a cryptocurrency business based in Iceland that is one of the largest bitcoin and ether mining operations. In 2016, he founded the Logos Fund, the first regulated fund for bitcoin and cryptocurrency mining in the world.

== Early life and education ==
Marco Streng was raised in the German state of Bavaria. He studied mathematics at LMU Munich but left before graduating. His interest in cryptocurrencies and blockchain technology developed while he was at university when he set up a mining operation in his student accommodation that was copied by other students. The operation ended when the electricity bill arrived.

== Career ==
In 2013, Streng co-founded Genesis Group with Marco Krohn, a cryptocurrency business of which he is the chief executive officer. In 2014 he co-founded Genesis Mining, a cryptocurrency mining business that is based on a former U.S. military site in Iceland because of the low energy and premises costs in that country. The cold climate also helps with the cooling of the tens of thousands of computers used in the mining operation. In 2017, Genesis was described by CNBC as "the world’s largest cloud-based blockchain and cryptocurrency mining company", and it was also one of the earliest large miners of the ether coin, carrying out mining activities for itself as well as renting out mining capacity to third parties.

In 2016, Streng founded the Logos Fund, registered with the U.S. Securities and Exchange Commission, that was described by Reuters as the first regulated fund for bitcoin and cryptocurrency mining in the world. He is the vice-chairman and co-founder of Hive Blockchain Technologies Limited, and the joint founder with the British technology investor Christopher Harborne of Singular AI Consulting Limited.

== Selected publications ==
- "Blockchain - The Case for Market Adoption of the Distributed Ledger" in Claudia Linnhoff-Popien et al. (Eds.) (2018) Digital Marketplaces Unleashed. Berlin: Springer. pp. 65–70. ISBN 9783662492758
