= Pixel Gun 3D =

2013 video game

- Developer: Lightmap
- Publisher: Cubic Games
- Platforms: iOS; Android: Amazon Fire; Windows Phone; Windows
- Release: May 2013: iOS, Android; May 2013; Windows Phone; before January 2014; Windows; April 2, 2024
- Genres: Battle royale, first-person shooter
- Modes: Single-player, multiplayer

Pixel Gun 3D is a 2013 first-person shooter game developed by Lightmap and published by Cubic Games for iOS and Android. Players choose from a variety of single-player and multiplayer modes, with single-player revolving around fighting enemies, while multiplayer puts several players up against each other in competitions. These competitions range from attempting to get the most kills, to being the last person standing in battle royale. A single-player campaign is available, which puts the player in the role of an unnamed protagonist investigating the sudden "square-ification" of the world and the outbreak of numerous monsters.

The game was originally developed by Alex Krasnov and was first released in May 2013. Ports for Windows Phone and Amazon Fire tablets followed. A version of the game for Steam released in April 2024. Since its initial release, the game has transferred developers, and is currently developed by Lightmap and published by Cubic Games. Pixel Gun 3D has received positive reviews from critics, with most highlighting the game's multiplayer modes, though some criticized its controls and technical performance. According to Cubic Games, the game has surpassed 185 million downloads and generated $200 million in profit as of October 2023. A sequel, Pixel Gun 2, was announced in May 2025.

== Gameplay ==
An old gameplay screenshot of Pixel Gun 3D, showing the player engaging in combat with a horde of zombies in the campaign mode

Pixel Gun 3D is a first-person shooter game with a pixelated art style reminiscent of Minecraft. Players are able to select up to six weapons, ranging from traditional guns such as sniper rifles to flamethrowers and spellbooks. Additional equipment, such as gadgets that serve a specific purpose (like grenades or a jetpack), pets that fight alongside the player, or armor with unique abilities (such as allowing double jumping) can be utilized by the player in battle as well. Players can also create their own assets in the game, such as skins, as well as join clans with other players.

The game features different modes, including single-player campaign and survival modes, local and online multiplayer, and a battle royale mode. In the campaign, the player is placed into a level and tasked to kill every enemy inside, defeating some sort of boss at the end. In survival mode, players fight off against an endless wave of enemies for as long as possible. Multiplayer modes put the player up against others worldwide, competing in different objectives such as attempting to get the most kills. In the early Windows Phone version, players could configure multiplayer matches by selecting a map, player limit and victory conditions. Password protection allowed them to restrict access to invited participants. In battle royale, a large number of players are placed onto a large map that gets smaller over time, with the last player standing winning.

Players can receive in-game items by either unlocking them through playing the game normally, or by purchasing them with in-game currency. The in-game currency itself can be purchased with real-world currency, with prices ranging as high as $100.

=== Plot ===
In the game's campaign, an unnamed protagonist investigates the sudden "square-ification" of the world, which occurred at the same time as an outbreak of various monsters. Attempting to solve both mysteries, the protagonist travels across different worlds after his house was attacked by zombies. He traverses throughout the countryside and reaches a facility known as Area 52, where a researcher tells him the outbreak originated from a portal in an elementary school. Going through the portal and traveling to a different dimension, he meets an unnamed survivor who travels alongside him before the group reach the Hell Castle, where a dragon takes them to another world. The protagonist and survivor reach a metropolis and discover the cause of the "square-ification," the result of an error in the game developer's code. After using virtual reality to fight the error (known as "The Bug"), the protagonist becomes trapped within the internet and becomes The Bug. After floating around the internet, he is found by a ship under attack by droids. After he defeats the droids, it is revealed that the protagonist is trapped inside of an online game known as Cubic Revolution, and the protagonist begins plotting on how to escape the internet for good.

== Development and release ==
Pixel Gun 3D is currently developed by the company Lightmap and published by Cubic Games. The game was released for iOS and Android devices in May 2013 for free, but early versions for iOS and Windows Phone cost $0.99. In its first three or four months, the game was titled Pixlgun 3D. Early versions doubled as an unofficial character designer for the PC edition of Minecraft and included references to the game such as creepers. The game is also available on Amazon Fire tablets.

Around August 2013, the game was updated with local multiplayer and quickly rose to No. 1 on the App Store, where it stayed until at least September. A major update in June 2014 allowed the game to be playable on lower end devices with only 512 MB of memory, as well as adding new game modes such as "Capture the Flag" and introducing additional multiplayer modes. After the game's release, Cubic Games was purchased by Nexters, a company based in Cyprus, in January 2022. Nexters later rebranded to GDEV Inc. in June 2023.

A version of Pixel Gun 3D for Steam was first announced in October 2023. This port was developed in collaboration with Samustai, another subsidiary of GDEV. Players of the mobile versions of Pixel Gun 3D are able to play with users on Steam via crossplay. Additionally, mobile players can link their accounts to Steam, transferring their progress. According to Cubic Games, over 200,000 users added the game to their Steam wishlist before its release on that platform. The port released on April 2, 2024. In May 2025, a sequel to the game, Pixel Gun 2, was announced. The sequel is scheduled to be released in 2026. Following a limited release in selected countries for 2 months, Pixel Gun 2 launched globally for iOS and Android in September 2026. Developed by Cubic Games, the sequel features five-player teams competing in arenas with destructible environments.

== Reception ==
Reception

Review scores
Publication	Score
148Apps	6/10
AppGet	4/5
Common Sense Media	3/5
TechTudo	8.0/10

Pixel Gun 3D has been met with positive reviews since its release. Most of its praise was directed towards its multiplayer modes, which were highlighted. Mike Deneen of 148Apps wrote that multiplayer was where the game "shines", believing it to be the reason the game was popular and what most players focused on. Chris Morris of Common Sense Media and Felipe Vinha of Techtudo believed the game to be fun in short durations of time. Vinha considered the amount of content available in the game to surpass the offerings of other free games; AppGet concurred, writing that each of the game modes had enough content for a standalone game. Deneen described the single-player modes as "bland" compared to the multiplayer. Several outlets have considered Pixel Gun 3D to be one of the best shooter or battle royale games for mobile devices.

Some reviewers were critical of the game's controls. Deneen described the game's controls as "frustrating", though wrote its problems to be more apparent in single-player modes than multiplayer. In addition, Deneen described the single-player modes as ‘bland’ compared to the multiplayer. He also criticised the requirement to repeat the introductory level on returning survival mode. Morris was neutral on the game's controls, writing that they had similar limitations to other mobile games. Rich Edmonds of Windows Central echoed similar thoughts.

Some were critical on the game's technical performance and monetization practices, with a 2015 article identifying the app's add-on features were substantially higher than other apps. Vinha criticized the game's bugs, which included the game suddenly crashing. They additionally criticized the game's advertisements, which they described as disrupting gameplay. Ian Boudreau of PCGamesN reported user complaints about the game's monetization model upon Pixel Gun 3D's release on Steam.

=== Sales ===
In January 2022, during its acquisition by Nexters Inc, Cubic Games reported that Pixel Gun 3D had been downloaded over 100 million times, with 10 million monthly active users and 1.5 million daily active users. They additionally claimed in a press release that Pixel Gun 3D was the third most active first-person shooter on mobile devices. In October 2023, Cubic Games reported that the game had been downloaded 185 million times and generated $200 million in profit. According to Boudreau, the game reached the top of the trending games chart on Steam upon its release on that platform.
