= Christopher Harborne =

British businessman based in Thailand (born 1963)

- Born: Christopher Charles Sherriff Harborne; 18 December 1962 (age 63); Mosborough, Derbyshire, England
- Other name: Chakrit Sakunkrit
- Citizenship: United Kingdom; Thailand
- Education: Downing College, Cambridge (MA, MEng); INSEAD (MBA)
- Title: Chief executive officer
- Board member of: Sherriff Global Group

Christopher Charles Sherriff Harborne (born 18 December 1962) is a British billionaire businessman and technology investor based in Thailand. He holds Thai citizenship under the name Chakrit Sakunkrit.

Harborne was an early investor in Bitcoin and Ethereum cryptocurrencies. He owns approximately 12% of Tether Limited, the company that issues the Tether stablecoin.

Harborne is known for his donations to British political parties. He previously donated to the UK's Conservative Party and is the largest single donor to Reform UK.

== Early life and education ==
Christopher Harborne was born on 18 December 1962 in Mosborough, South Yorkshire, to Edgar Harborne, an insurance investor, and Joan, a housewife. He is a descendant of English writer R. C. Sherriff and has two siblings, including his late sister Katharine. He went to Westminster School. He took an MA and MEng from Downing College, Cambridge. In 1988, he gained an MBA from the Institut européen d'administration des affaires (INSEAD).

== Career ==
Harborne worked for five years as a management consultant at McKinsey and Co., before running a research company in Asia. He describes himself as an "investor in new tech, including open software blockchain platforms". He is the CEO of Sherriff Global Group which trades in private planes, and the owner of AML Global, a firm that sells aviation fuel. He has made a donation to enable the founding of INSEAD San Francisco and to create a Blockchain Research Fund. He has set up a company, Singular AI Consulting Limited, with cryptocurrency miner Marco Streng. As of December 2019, he is based in Thailand. According to The Times, Harborne's name "features in the Panama Papers as an intermediary of companies linked to offshore accounts".

=== Political donations ===
Harborne donated more than £6m to the Brexit Party in 2019, £3 million in the summer and £3 million before the United Kingdom general election in 2019, making him the largest donor that year.

Before switching his donations to the Brexit Party, Harborne had donated smaller sums, averaging £15,000 per annum since 2001 totalling about £270,000, to the Conservative Party. In November 2022, Harborne donated £1 million to The Office of Boris Johnson Ltd, one of the biggest donations ever made to an individual British politician. The government awarded Qinetiq, a company in which Harborne was the largest single shareholder, an £80 million Ministry of Defence contract in January 2023. He acted as an advisor to Boris Johnson on his trip to Kyiv in September 2023 to meet Volodymyr Zelenskyy.

In 2024 he gifted £5 million to Nigel Farage, shortly before Farage announced that he had decided to stand as a candidate in that year's general election. Farage did not declare this gift at the time. This gift was disputed in May 2026 as to whether it constituted a donation that should be registered. Farage did not disclose what he considered a personal gift, to spend as he wished. However, in May 2026 the Electoral Commission and the Parliamentary Commissioner for Standards began investigations.

Harborne donated £9 million to Reform UK (the new name for the Brexit Party) in 2025, and a further £3 million in March 2026, making him the largest single donor to a UK political party in a financial year in UK history. As of April 2026 his donations to Reform UK amounted to more than £22 million in total. In September 2026, he pledged to match a £36 million donation to Reform UK – the largest donation to a political party in UK history.

== Personal life ==
Harborne has lived in Thailand for over 20 years. However, in the Sunday Times Rich List 2026 ranking of the wealthiest people with British residence, he was placed 6th with an estimated fortune of £18.177 billion.
