= Pyroblazer =

2008 video game

- Developer: Eipix Entertainment
- Publishers: Candella Software; City Interactive (Eastern Europe)
- Engine: Ultra Engine
- Platform: Microsoft Windows
- Release: NA: November 13, 2008; EU: November 13, 2008
- Genre: Combat racing
- Mode: Single-player

Pyroblazer is a futuristic combat racing game developed by Eipix Entertainment for Microsoft Windows. The game is published by Candella Software. The game was released on Steam, Gamersgate, and Direct2Drive on November 13, 2008.

== Gameplay ==
In Pyroblazer, players take control of futuristic anti-gravity combat craft called Blazers and pilot them against each other across the lands of a world known as New Aperion. Players attack other players by collecting weapon and ammo upgrades throughout a race, and new, more powerful Blazers can be unlocked as a player wins the single-player Championship mode.

=== Multiplayer ===
Aside from the single-player modes, six-person local multiplayer would also be featured in Pyroblazer, as well as an online multiplayer mode.

However, the multiplayer component of Pyroblazer was later removed due to lack of funding.

=== Playable Demo ===
On November 24, 2008, an exclusive playable demo was released to the Total Gaming Network. The demo features two different levels: Wastelands of Aperion (Daytime) and Fusion Sphere (Nighttime). Along with these two levels, gamers can choose from four different Blazers to race and shoot their way through the courses.
