= Fishdom =

2008 video game

- Developer: Playrix (Note: JoinDots GmbH developed the DS/DSi versions.)
- Publisher: Playrix (Note: The DS version was published by Rondomedia Marketing und Vertriebs GmbH in Europe and Atari in North America. The DSi/3DS version was published by JoinDots GmbH.)
- Series: Fishdom
- Platforms: Windows, Mac, Android, iOS, iPadOS, Nintendo DS, Nintendo 3DS
- Release: Windows/Mac; WW: 19 June 2008; Nintendo DS; DE: 16 September 2009; NA: 21 February 2011; Nintendo DSi/Nintendo 3DS; EU: 13 November 2014; NA: 25 February 2015; iOS/Android (Deep Dive); WW: 10 December 2015
- Genres: Puzzle game, social game
- Mode: Single-player

Fishdom is a puzzle game developed by Playrix for Microsoft Windows, Mac OS, Nintendo DS, Nintendo 3DS, Android, iOS, and iPadOS. The game was originally launched on 19 June 2008.

== Gameplay ==
Reception

Review scores
Publication	Score
Gamezebo	3.5/5
Nintendo Life	6/10

The object of the game is to solve puzzles and earn coins to set up and decorate a virtual aquarium. Using in-game currency the player is able to purchase different species of fish, decorations, and "comfort" items to make the environment more pleasant for pet fishes. Filling all of the three meter gauges measuring the progress will unlock one of the trophies: bronze, silver, or gold. Adorned and themed tanks can be used as a smartphone screensaver.

Levels are based on a standard for "match three" mechanics: the player swaps two adjacent gems to make matches of three or more. Each of the rounds takes place on a different grid and poses a challenge to earn golden tiles by matching gems at least once over each one. Some of the tiles are locked and have a different color; to unlock them the player must match gems consecutively over multiple turns. When three or more objects are matched simultaneously, one of the bonuses appears: firecrackers, depth bombs, dynamite charges, or lightning. The puzzle board must be cleared before the player runs out of moves, otherwise the level must be repeated in order to progress further. The platform also provides mini-games, holiday-themed upgrades, pearl tournament challenges, and a 3D-simulation of a scuba mask which allows the user to dive into the deep sea. By 2019, Playrix changed the gaming model to "freemium", in which various currencies such as diamonds can also be purchased in the app.

== Reception ==
The original game was released in 2008 for PC and was adapted for smartphones by 2015. In addition, several sequels have been launched.

Fishdom ranks among the most popular games from developer Playrix and received generally positive reviews. iParenting Media named Fishdom H2O: Hidden Odyssey one of the Greatest Video Games of 2009. According to the analytics of Sensor Tower, Fishdom was a top game in the category Puzzle&Decorate with around 15.6 million downloads in 2020. The game was ranked 16th on the annual App Store list of the best free games (8th for iPad, 19th for iPhone). According to Statista, the game was one of the ten most downloaded puzzle gaming apps as of 2021.
