= Alex Gerko =

Russian-born financial trader (born 1979)

- Born: 3 December 1979 (age 46); Russia
- Education: Moscow State University (BSc, MSc, PhD); New Economic School (MSc)
- Occupation: Businessman
- Known for: Founder & owner of XTX Markets
- Children: 3

Alexander Gerko (born 3 December 1979) is a Russian-born British billionaire financial trader and founder of XTX Markets based in the United Kingdom. Gerko has a Ph.D. in mathematics and wrote several research papers, including one that tested market timing for trading. As of 2026, his net worth is estimated at US$17.1 billion according to the Bloomberg Billionaires Index and Forbes.

== Career ==
Born in Russia to a Russian Jewish family, he holds a bachelor's degree and a master's degree in mathematics from Moscow State University; a PhD in mathematics from the same institution, a master of economics from the New Economic School, and a master's degree from the Independent University of Moscow. Initially, Gerko began his career trading equities at Deutsche Bank in 2004 before transitioning into foreign exchange trading.

In 2009, he joined GSA Capital, a UK-based hedge fund, where he stayed until 2015.

In January 2015, Gerko founded XTX Markets, an algorithmic trading company that uses algorithms to trade the difference in market prices across a variety of venues. Gerko holds a 75 per cent interest in the company.

In 2022, the company reported a 64% increase in profits to £1.1 billion.

Gerko set up a family office called Cromulon Capital in 2024.

== Philanthropy ==
Since 2020 Gerko has donated £25 million to out-of-class maths clubs, through the Axiom Maths charity (formerly Mathematics Education for Social Mobility and Excellence), which Gerko set up.

In 2026, Gerko funded the development of the MOTHRA telescope, an astronomy project in central Chile to map the large-scale structure of intergalactic gas that connects galaxies, also known as the cosmic web. The telescope will use an array of 1,140 telephoto lenses and AI to analyze the faint emissions from the gas between galaxies over a three-year observation window.

== Personal life ==
Gerko moved to the UK in 2006. He is married to Elena, an economist at the Bank of England. The couple and their three children live in north London. In 2022, Gerko renounced his Russian citizenship after a lengthy legal process. He is a British citizen.

In January 2024, he was named as the largest taxpayer in the UK by the Sunday Times Tax List, paying £664.5 million in tax. In the Sunday Times Rich List 2024 ranking of the wealthiest people in the UK he was placed 12th with an estimated net worth of £12.055 billion.

In July 2024, Gerko lost a legal appeal against HM Revenue & Customs regarding the taxation of a deferred payment plan from his time at hedge fund GSA Capital between 2010 and 2015. The Court of Appeal ruled that Gerko and other traders should pay income tax on their share of trading profits, rather than the lower corporation tax rate they had argued for.

As of September 2025, Gerko's net worth is estimated at US$13.4 billion according to the Bloomberg Billionaires Index.
