= GDEV =

Cypriot video game developer

GDEV Inc.
- Formerly: Nexters
- Type: Public
- Traded as: Nasdaq:GDEV
- ISIN: VGG6529J1003
- Industry: Video game industry
- Predecessor: Nexters Inc. (2014–2023)
- Founded: 2023; 3 years ago
- Founders: Andrey Fadeev
- Headquarters: Limassol, Cyprus
- Revenue: ▼US$421 million (2024)
- Operating income: ▼US$42 million (2024)
- Number of employees: 900+ (2024)
- Subsidiaries: Nexters, Cubic Games, Royal Ark, Game Gears, Light Hour Games
- Website: gdev.inc

GDEV Inc. is a gaming and entertainment holding company. It is a publicly traded company listed on the Nasdaq stock exchange, headquartered in Limassol, Cyprus. The holding was evolved in June 2023 from a video game company Nexters, founded in 2014, one of the top five independent mobile game companies in Europe. Subsidiaries of GDEV include Nexters Studio, which operates offices in Cyprus, Armenia, and Kazakhstan, as well as Cubic Games, Royal Ark, Game Gears and Light Hour Games. The company is best known for the mobile games Throne Rush and Hero Wars.

== History ==
Nexters Studio was established in 2014 by Andrey Fadeev and Boris Gertsovskiy. Before founding Nexters, Gertsovskiy operated his own gaming studio Crazy Bit, while Fadeev led Progrestar, a social games development company renowned for its viral free-to-play game Friend Factory, which attracted over 20 million users. In 2013, Progrestar launched Throne Rush, a strategy game that became one of the top social games on Facebook and VK the following year.

In 2014, after knowing each other since 2010, Fadeev and Gertsovskiy decided to merge their companies. That same year, they made the decision to open a Nexters' headquarters in Cyprus. This led to Nexters' first release, Island Experiment, a casual game for social networks.

=== Hero Wars ===
In 2016, Nexters released Hero Wars, a free-to-play browser and action RPG. A mobile version was released for Android and iOS in 2017. In July 2023, Nexters underwent a rebranding, renaming the Facebook and browser version to Hero Wars: Dominion Era and the mobile version to Hero Wars: Alliance.

Hero Wars is a midcore game with intense gameplay in short-session cycles, available in over 100 countries. Over the past two years, monthly active users have grown 8.5-fold, reaching six million, according to Nexters. In 2014, the advertising campaigns for the game Hero Wars on social media attracted regulatory scrutiny in Germany due to violence against women and the inaccurate nature of the ads compared to the games themselves. In 2025, Hero Wars generated $1.7 billion in revenue and surpassed 185 million installations. That same year, the studio partnered with Embracer to introduce Lara Croft in Hero Wars, bringing in over 500,000 new players through this collaboration.

The popularity of Hero Wars significantly boosted interest in Nexters and attracted new investments. In 2018, Igor and Dmitry Bukhman, the founders of Playrix, acquired the investors' shares in Nexters. According to Nexters, in 2018, the company made $48 million in sales. In November 2019, Nexters entered the Top 10 largest European mobile developers. Already in 2019, 95% of Nexters' revenue came from mobile games in international markets, and revenue grew almost 15 times, generated $318 million in bookings and $120 million in free cash flow to equity (FCFE) in 2020. As of 2020, 35% of the company's net bookings came from the United States, 23% from Europe, and 19% from Asia.

Its flagship product, Hero Wars RPG, was downloaded 36 million times in 2020 on iOS and Android. The game has remained consistently popular in the mobile and browser gaming market. In 2024, Hero Wars was recognized as one of the best RPG games by the AppGallery Editors’ Choice Awards, ranked fourth among the Worldwide Top Free RPGs according to AppMagic, and became the most visited core browser game in September, based on Similarweb data. In 2025, it was included in Pocket Tactics’ list of The Best Free Mobile Games.

=== IPO on Nasdaq ===
In February 2021, Nexters announced it would go public on Nasdaq via a SPAC deal with Kismet Acquisition One Corp. Kismet invested $50 million, while Nexters raised an additional $50 million from the Abu Dhabi-based Mubadala Investment Company and VPE Capital in July 2021. In August, Nexters completed the merger with Kismet Acquisition One, which valued Nexters at $1.9 billion. Shares started trading on Nasdaq under the ticker symbols GDEV. The deal brought Nexters approximately $150 million, which the company planned to use for expansion in the global market.

In 2021, in addition to the released Chibi Island at the end of the year the company soft-launched the new casual game Island Questaway. Nexters plans to launch a match-3-style game, Riddle Island, in 2022.

In January 2022, Nexters announced plans to acquire 100% of Cubic Games, 48.8% of MX Capital Limited (RJ Games), and 49.5% of Castcrown Limited (Royal Ark). The total value of these deals amounted to nearly $100 million.

On February 28, 2022, Nasdaq halted the trading of Nexters' stock due to regulatory concerns as the stock exchange sought more information following economic sanctions imposed on Russia after its invasion of Ukraine. On March 16, 2023, Nasdaq resumed trading Nexters' stock.

In June 2022, the company launched a global relocation program, moving the vast majority of critical personnel from Russia, Ukraine, and Belarus to Cyprus, Kazakhstan, and Armenia. At the same time, its Russia-based subsidiaries were divested by transferring the gaming business in Russia to local management.

=== GDEV Holding ===
On June 22, 2023, Nexters Global Inc. restructured as GDEV holding company, becoming its largest subsidiary, along with Cubic Games, Game Gears and Royal Ark. More studios are expected to be added in the future. The GDEV gaming holding replaced Nexters as the publicly traded entity on Nasdaq.

Overall, in 2024, GDEV's entire portfolio generated $421 million in revenue, 550 million downloads, and over 14 million monthly active players combined. Geographically, 34% of the revenue came from the United States, 27% from Europe, and 24% from Asia.

In April 2024, GDEV successfully launched a mobile game titled Pixel Gun 3D for PC. The game quickly ranked among the top 20 best-selling and top 50 most-played games on Steam. On its first day, it reached a peak concurrent player count of 25,000 on Steam, and it recouped its PC platform development costs on the release day. In the second quarter of 2024, GDEV recorded $108 million in bookings. This growth came from a $47 million investment in user acquisition, leading to an adjusted EBITDA of $16 million.

== Studios and games ==
By September 2025, GDEV houses five portfolio gaming studios with over 900 employees and several globally games for different genres and platforms. GDEV's studios:

- Nexters, a leading studio, develops mobile, web, and social games, including Hero Wars Alliance, Hero Wars: Dominion Era, and Island Hoppers, which reached 250 million downloads as of July 2024.
- Cubic Games is a European mobile game publisher, best known for its flagship mobile shooter Pixel Gun 3D. In 2022, the game had over 170 million total downloads and 5.5 million of the monthly active user. Cubic Games is also currently developing its second game, Block City Wars (no longer developed), which has already reached over 85 million downloads on the App Store and Google Play combined.
- Royal Ark is a young international gaming company specializing in survival games, including Zombie Miner, which has already surpassed 2 million downloads, and Dawn of Zombies (no longer developed).
- Game Gears was acquired by GDEV in January 2022, and the team here is made up of experienced mobile game developers. They are currently working on RnD projects.
- Light Hour Games was acquired by GDEV in September 2025, and the team here is made up of experienced mobile game developers. They are currently working on RnD projects.

Studio	Game's title	Genre	Release	Platform
Nexters	Throne Rush (no longer developed)	Strategy	2013	iOS, Android, Facebook, Web Browser
Nexters	Hero Wars	Fantasy 2D Auto Runner	2016	iOS, Android, Web Browser
Nexters	Island Hoppers	Farming Adventure	2021	iOS, Android, Web Browser
Nexters	Puzzle Odyssey (no longer developed)	Tile-matching	2023	TBD
Cubic Games	Pixel Gun 3D	Action	2013	Steam, iOS, Android
Royal Ark	Zombie Miner	Simulation with RPG elements	2022	iOS, Android
Royal Ark	Dawn of Zombies (no longer developed)	RPG	2020	iOS, Android
Game Gears	Shelter War (no longer developed)	RPG	2020	iOS, Android
Game Gears	Aliens vs Zombies	Tower Defense	2024	iOS, Android
Light Hour Games	Tile Foodies	Tile-matching puzzle	2025	Android
