= Sean Healey =

American businessman (1961–2020)

Sean M. Healey
- Born: May 9, 1961; San Rafael, California, U.S.
- Died: May 26, 2020 (aged 59)
- Education: Harvard University (AB, JD)
- Occupation: Businessman
- Title: Chairman & CEO of Affiliated Managers Group
- Term: 2005–2018
- Spouses: Kerry Murphy (divorced); Amy Broch (m. 2018)
- Children: 3

Sean Michael Healey (May 9, 1961 – May 26, 2020) was an American businessman who was chairman and chief executive officer of Affiliated Managers Group, Inc. (NYSE: AMG), a global asset management firm whose affiliates in aggregate managed approximately $736 billion as of December 31, 2018.

== Early life and education ==
Healey was born in San Rafael, California. Healey attended high school in Oceanside, California, followed by Harvard College, where he was a member of the varsity wrestling squad. In 1983, he received an A.B. in history and literature, magna cum laude, and was elected to Phi Beta Kappa.

After graduating from Harvard, Healey was awarded a Rotary Scholarship to study philosophy at University College in Dublin, Ireland, and was awarded a master's degree in philosophy with first-class honors in 1984. In 1987, he earned a J.D. from Harvard Law School, and he was an editor of the Harvard Law Review.

== Early career ==
Upon graduation from law school, Healey joined Goldman Sachs as an associate in the Mergers and Acquisitions Department, then transferred to a group that provided investment-banking services to financial institutions, where he worked under J. Christopher Flowers.

== Affiliated Managers Group ==
In April 1995, Healey was recruited to join Affiliated Managers Group (AMG), then a three-person start-up firm seeking to invest in boutique money managers. AMG was founded in 1993 with private equity backing from TA Associates and made its first investment in 1994. When Healey joined AMG as Executive Vice President, the firm had a single investment in a manager with under $1 billion of assets under management.

With Healey on board, AMG received its second round of capital and subsequently invested in several U.S.-based investment firms. By October 1996, AMG had approximately $18 billion under management. In October 1997, AMG closed its investment for a 70% stake in Tweedy, Browne Company LLC, a well-known value-oriented investment management firm.

In November 1997, Healey led AMG's initial public offering in which the company raised $176 million, priced at $23.50 per share. With proceeds from the offering, AMG continued to expand, and named Healey president and chief operating officer in October 1999. In 2001, AMG was named in Fortune magazine's list of 100 Fastest-Growing Companies and had approximately $81 billion in assets under management. Healey became president and chief executive officer in 2005, and chairman and chief executive officer in 2011.

AMG’s business model of leaving a portion of equity with each firm's management as motivation for continuing to produce good performance and growth has been highly successful under Healey's leadership. AMG also uses employment contracts to ensure that asset management firms retain talented managers, and establishes long-term succession plans with managers. Healey has also been noted for being extraordinarily selective of his affiliate partners, stating in a recent interview that the company ultimately backs away from many more potential investments than it pursues.

Healey also helped AMG to expand globally. AMG opened the firm's first distribution office in Australia in 2007, and thereafter expanded into Europe, Asia and the Middle East, to help its affiliates develop relationships in overseas markets. AMG furthered its expansion with the formation of AMG Wealth Partners in 2011.

After AMG posted three-year average earnings growth of 40%, Fortune magazine again named AMG to its list of 100 Fastest-Growing Companies in 2012.

In May 2018, Healey was diagnosed with amyotrophic lateral sclerosis (a motor neuron disease otherwise known as ALS, or Lou Gehrig's disease) and AMG announced that Healey was stepping back to become Executive Chairman while Nate Dalton, AMG's long-time President and Chief Operating Officer, was named CEO.

== The Healey Center for ALS ==
In November 2018, Healey, with support from AMG and a group of friends and colleagues, established the Sean M. Healey and AMG Center for ALS at Massachusetts General Hospital with an initial donation of $40 million. The Healey Center is led by Dr. Merit Cudkowicz, a world-renowned ALS researcher and Chair of the Neurology Department at MGH. The Healey Center is the largest hospital-based ALS research program in the world and supports a broad range of early stage trials of promising ALS treatments.

== Personal life ==
Healey held a number of nonprofit board positions, including serving as co-chairman of the board of trustees of the Peabody Essex Museum; as a member of the Council on Foreign Relations; the Visiting Committee of the Harvard Law School; and the board of trustees of the International Game Fish Association.

In 2006, Healey was appointed by President George W. Bush to serve on the President’s Export Council, the U.S.'s principal advisory committee on international trade.

Healey was an avid big-game hunter and sport fisherman, having boated a 93.5 pound white marlin, which was the winning fish in the 2010 White Marlin Open, the world's largest billfish tournament.

He was previously married to Kerry M. Healey, the former Lieutenant Governor of Massachusetts. They had two children. Healey remarried in 2018 to Amy Broch. The couple had one daughter.

Healey died from amytrophic lateral sclerosis on May 26, 2020, at the age of 59.
