= Minovate =

Chinese video game company

Shenzhen Minovate Technology Co.
- Native name: 迷你玩
- Company type: Civilian-run enterprise
- Industry: Video games
- Founded: June 10, 2015; 11 years ago
- Founders: Gu Zhenxing; Zhang Zexiang
- Headquarters: Shenzhen, Guangdong, China
- Products: Mini World

Minovate (Chinese: 迷你玩), officially known as Shenzhen Minovate Technology Co., Ltd., is a video game company based in China, established as Miniwan on June 10, 2015, in Shenzhen. The company's main product is Mini World.

== History ==
Minovate was established as Miniwan on June 10, 2015 in Shenzhen, Guangdong, China. In the same year, they developed and released the first version of the sandbox game Mini World, which officially launched on the mobile app stores in Mainland China in the next year. In 2017, Mini World announced that it had over 100 million users across multiple platforms in Mainland China. In 2018, Mini World announced that its monthly active users had exceeded 50 million, and the number of registered users had broken through 200 million. In 2019, Mini Coding was launched.

== Controversies ==
=== Plagiarism controversy ===
In 2017, the Chinese version of Minecraft, represented by NetEase, was launched, and subsequently, a crackdown was carried out on games in Mainland China "suspected of pirating/copying Minecraft" (including Mini World).

On August 15, 2017, NetEase issued a letter of rights protection to Minovate, accusing it of copying Minecraft, and demanded that the game be removed from the shelves. After the letter was sent, the gaming community TapTap temporarily removed the game from its platform, and it was re-listed shortly after. However, due to the claimed "copyright issues", the game was not available for download.

In 2018, NetEase sued the operator of Mini World for infringing the copyright of the artistic works of Minecraft and demanded the removal of the infringing works, as well as cessation of unfair competitive practices. In the first trial, Minovate and Huaduo Company raised jurisdictional objections, but the court rejected them; they appealed to the Guangzhou Intellectual Property Court, and the jurisdictional objections were accepted by the court, transferring the case to the Shenzhen Intermediate People's Court for trial. On October 13, 2018, NetEase withdrew the lawsuit against Minovate.

In December 2020, the Shenzhen Intermediate People's Court determined that 267 basic core elements in Mini World were substantially similar to the content in Minecraft, resulting in the game's visuals being substantially similar, and thus ruled that Mini World constituted an overall infringement. The court ordered Minovate to immediately cease the infringing actions, remove the 267 core elements involved in the case, and compensated NetEase with 21.132 million yuan (3,062,312 USD).

=== Plants vs. Zombies agency incident ===
In 2024, Minovate's subsidiary, Hainan Mengxing, announced the agency of Plants vs. Zombies 3, which caused dissatisfaction among some players of Minecraft and Plants vs. Zombies. Some Plants vs. Zombies players commented on the Bilibili game page.
