= Sunday Times Rich List =

Annually published UK list

- List of 350 UK residents, ranked in order of net worth

Publication details
- Publication: The Sunday Times
- First published: 1989
- Latest publication: 15 May 2026

Current list details (2026)
- Wealthiest: Dheeraj Hinduja and Sanjay Hinduja
- Net worth (1st): ▲£38 billion

The Sunday Times Rich List is a list of the 350 wealthiest people or families resident in the United Kingdom ranked by net wealth. The list is updated annually in April and has been published as a magazine supplement by British national Sunday newspaper The Sunday Times since 1989. The editorial decisions governing the compilation of the Rich List are published in the newspaper and online as its "Rules of engagement".

The Rich List is not limited to British citizens and it includes individuals and families born overseas but who predominantly work and/or live in Britain. This excludes some individuals with prominent financial assets in Britain.

The editors estimate subjects' wealth from a range of public information, based on values in January each year. They typically explain their actions by stating: "We measure identifiable wealth, whether land, property, racehorses, art or significant shares in publicly quoted companies. We exclude bank accounts—to which we have no access... We try to give due consideration to liabilities."

The 2015 list marked the first year Queen Elizabeth II was not among the list's top 300 most wealthy since the list began in 1989. She was number one on the inaugural Sunday Times Rich List 1989.

The most recent list was published online on 15 May 2026 and in print as a magazine supplement on 17 May 2026.

== Tax List ==
The Sunday Times Tax List was inaugurated on 27 January 2019 in the Sunday Times Magazine, using data collected for the Rich List and edited by Robert Watts.

== Giving List ==
Since 2005, as part of the Rich List, The Sunday Times has produced an annual Giving List, which tracks the most generous philanthropists in the UK as a proportion of their wealth. In 2018, it was reported that, of the 300 philanthropists listed in the Giving List, a total of £3.207 billion was given away.

Jamie Cooper, the former wife of hedge fund manager Sir Christopher Hohn, was ranked in first place with a giving index of 88.89%, which amounted to donations in 2018 of £299.6 million.

== Book version ==
A fuller version of the Rich List is also published in a reference book edition, edited by Philip Beresford. This list covers the top 5,000 richest people, rather than the top 1,000, and includes their business addresses:

- Sunday Times Rich List 2006–2007 was published by A & C Black in December 2006 (ISBN 978-0713679410).
- Sunday Times Rich List 2007–2008 was due to be published by A & C Black in November 2007 (ISBN 978-0713685152) but no book appeared due to a deadlock between the publishers and The Sunday Times. The publisher was keen to carry on but only if a CD version was attached to the book. The Sunday Times would not allow this as it would give competitors a chance to develop their own database and launch rival rich lists.

== See also ==
- Happy List
- Forbes list of billionaires
- List of British billionaires by net worth
- List of music artists by net worth
- List of celebrities by net worth
