= Township (video game) =

Freemium city-building game

- App icon
- Developer: Playrix
- Publisher: Playrix
- Platforms: iOS, iPadOS, Android, macOS, Windows, Facebook (Adobe Flash)
- Release: Apple App Store; December 24, 2012; Google Play; November 13, 2013; Amazon App Store; February 16, 2014; Microsoft Store; May 14, 2015
- Genres: Construction and management simulation, city-building

Township is a casual farming and city-building game by Playrix developed and launched on multiple platforms in which players develop starter towns by building factories, harvesting crops, and producing goods. The main goal of the game is to link one independent agriculture operation into a complete set of industrial chains, increase income, expand the territory, and construct houses, 'community buildings' and factories. Township was originally available as an Adobe Flash application on WhatsApp Social and was later released on the App Store, Google Play, Huawei AppGallery, Amazon Appstore, Microsoft Store, and Mac App Store.

== Gameplay ==
The gameplay is built upon the core gameplay of farming and production, and casual order board games. The player starts harvesting crops such as wheat, corn, carrots and more. These crops are used to feed farm animals for milk, eggs wool etc and to produce goods in factories. Farming and manufacture take time to finish, as the game is in sync with real time. The time to finish said tasks, however, can be sped up using an in-game currency named "Township cash". At the initial levels, players are assisted by a character named Ernie who gives them brief tutorials. This process can be sped up with in-game currency.

The crops grown, produce farmed and materials produced can all be used to complete orders for townspeople, and doing so rewards in-game coins and experience points. Players level up when they obtain enough experience points, which unlocks new areas of the game. These materials are stored in the "Barn", which has a cap on how many items can be stored at once.

The city-building mechanics of Township differs from traditional games of the genre. Town planning and layout have an insignificant impact on the outcome, and this allows players to concentrate on other aspects of the game. They have access to constructions of different categories — housing, "community buildings", factories, farm buildings, decorations and "special buildings". Community buildings and housing have a significant effect on town development, as community buildings are needed to increase the population cap so more housing can be built, which is necessary for further development and expanding the town. Players can also place decorations around their towns, with over 200 being available.

Township encourages interactions between players by joining 'teams' (formerly 'Co-ops') and making in-game 'friends'. Through the team mechanism, members are able to ask for help with fulfilling orders, filling orders for other players, and taking part in an in-game 'Regatta' against other teams, which rewards additional materials if won. Later on, the developers added a chat function to boost the social aspect of Township. As a reward to regular players, a "Daily Bonus" mechanism is used, which is awarded after playing for multiple days in a row.

Outside of the core gameplay, special "Adventure" events are publicised, where upon advancing in the event by playing match-three puzzle levels, players can earn materials and other items in the main game. Before this mechanism, however, Township incorporated different mini-games and casual and "hyper-casual" challenges, for example a time management cooking simulation, named Italian Week, or a previous version of the match-three mode, named Color Splash. The usual event duration is 7–10 days on a non-continuous basis. Each mini-game had a progression loop to motivate players to compete on a leaderboard.

=== Train system ===
Level 5 unlocks a free train simulation that allows the exchange of goods for construction materials and mining tools. The train has at least three carriages and will leave when the cars are packed. It takes almost 2–5 hours for the train to deliver the materials, and then another train will arrive at the train station waiting to be filled with items. A reward for fulfilling orders is available after the train's return in the form of upgrade or expansion materials. Later on, players can upgrade the train to reduce its travel time.

Farmland is unlocked based on the number of people in a town, and the more people a player has, the more farmland they can build. However there is a cap on the number of people, which can be increased by building community buildings that require materials only received through trains and markets. The difficulty of expanding the city area increases with the level. At first, players only need money to expand the city area, but later need shovels, axes, and saw blades. These items can also only be obtained through the train.

In the middle and later stages of the game, players experience difficulties with available space in the warehouse. The upgrade materials for warehouses, the train, and community buildings, and city expansion materials all take up warehouse space. Additionally, as all activities must be transferred through the warehouse, orders can't be complete if it's full. This requires upgrading the granary with upgrade materials, such as nails, hammers, and paint, although more of each material are required every time it is upgraded. Players can also sell the items in the warehouse at a low price to free up space.

As the player's level increases, they can repair the second and third railroads.

=== Aircraft system ===
Once they reach Level 17, players can repair the airport and use an airplane to earn coins and XP points, filling orders in stipulated time before departure.

Airports require three groups of the same number and type of items, two or three of each, to be ready within 15 hours. Each delivery of a kind of item is rewarded with a batch of gold coins. Each completed group will be rewarded with more, and completing three groups will result in banknotes and gems.

If players do not send out a plane within 15 hours, they will not get most of the rewards. However, players can force a plane to be sent out when the items are incomplete. The interval between planes is five hours.

=== Ordering system ===
The source of the town's development is planting and farming. Crops and various agricultural products are put into multiple factories to be processed into different products. Players get gold and experience value by completing orders for the inhabitants via helicopter. Orders are one of the most direct ways to earn money and need to be delivered by helicopter, so it's recommended to place the helicopter in the city's center. If a player feels they can't complete an order, they can cancel it but it will be at least half an hour before the next one appears.

Orders that have emerged are not limited in time so there may be items in the order that are not available for the player to produce at the time they receive it.

=== Mine ===
At level 21, players can repair the mine where they dig for ores. There are four kinds of ores: copper, silver, gold, and platinum, and every five ores can be made into a metal in the smelter.

There are three tools to dig and destroy rock tiles: pickaxe (destroy a grid), dynamite (destroy a horizontal row), and TNT (destroy a circle around). Mining tools and ore do not take up warehouse space, but the smelter can only do one metal at a time and must take the previous one.

Mine allows extracting precious metals, hidden chests, coins, messages from friends, and other artifacts. Mining also produces resources to level up buildings, which reduces production time and various improvements.

=== Ship system (port) ===
Using Ships, players can get rare items and treasures. The maximum number of ships is 4, and each ship may carry up to 3 crates.

The first ship is free, the second one 5,000 gold coins, the third one 8,000 gold coins, and the fourth one 25,000 gold coins. Players can order the ship to go to the relevant island to acquire the unproductive materials by paying these fees. There are four islands: Frutus Isle (including peach, watermelon, and plum), Olive Isle (including grape, olive, and key lime), Tropica Isle (including banana, coconut, and pineapple), and Fishermen's Isle (fish, shrimp, and lobster). One ingot of metal can be added to each sailing to get better supplies from the trip.

=== Zoo ===
After the 2015 upgrade, players are given an opportunity to build and run Zoo, which upgrades require assets produced in the city. Unlocking new animals enables additional buildings to the zoo layout (a cafe, souvenir shop, and fast food).

=== Teams ===
After reaching a certain level, players can select and join a team (formerly known as a co-op) where they can meet and collaborate with other players. Players can request supplies or give their supplies to those in need in the team.

Periodically, team regattas take place. Parties need to complete chosen tasks in a given time to collect points.

=== Collection cards ===
The cards were introduced in mid-2025. They come in packs known as "Towncards," which are obtained by filling train cars, during the Treasure Tree and Green Machine phases, and through other events. Each card has a star rating from 1 to 5; these stars accumulate to unlock booster chests and card packs. There are five types of packs, yielding 2, 3, 4, or 6 cards depending on the type; the gold pack, in addition to six cards, guarantees one card you do not yet own. Cards are used to complete card sets, which award a prize upon completion. Duplicate cards can be sent to others—up to three per day, excluding gold cards—while you can request one card per day from your co-op. Completing the entire card collection awards boosters, 10,000 T-Cash, and a decorative icon; completing it a second time awards boosters, 15,000 T-Cash, and a crystal decorative icon; thereafter, only boosters and 15,000 T-Cash are awarded for each completed collection. The event lasts 63 days; once it ends, a new collection begins, and any remaining stars or unopened packs are lost.

=== Events ===
The Treasure Tree event features a rotating weekly side event: "Crazy Drill," which involves clearing 3 to 7 levels while competing against two other players—the winner receives card packs and boosters; and "Tractor Race," which involves clearing 15 levels against four other players—the top three finishers earn boosters, temporary infinite lives, and card packs. The Green Machine event runs alongside "Disco Fever," where players use the Color Ball booster to earn points based on the colors destroyed or through combinations with other boosters; combining two Color Balls yields a massive score boost. Players compete against others for one hour, with the winner receiving a card pack and boosters; this event can be completed once daily. Both events include the "City Cup," where players earn trophies for each level cleared—with bonus trophies awarded for difficult levels—while competing against others. This event runs three times a week for two days during the Green Machine event; the top 10 players receive superior rewards, including card packs, infinite lives, and boosters, with the first-place winner earning a gold pack, three hours of infinite lives, boosters, and mining tools.

Other events include: spinning a prize wheel alongside another player to earn points used for upgrading ships and unlocking rewards; once all three ships are fully upgraded, players claim a chest containing 2,500 T-Cash, a gold pack, and boosters. Play a pinball-style game against another player where you launch a ball that hits power-ups and racks up points—which are multiplied by 1, 2, 3, or 10 depending on where it lands. These points are used to upgrade a plant; you earn rewards as you progress with the upgrade, eventually obtaining a pink petal. Once all four petals are collected, a chest opens containing 2,500 T-Cash, a golden envelope, and power-ups.

== Commercial and reception ==
Township was launched in 2011 as a freemium social game on Google+, and later, it was adopted for Facebook. After redesigning, it was also launched on smartphones, and became the first mobile game from the developer Playrix; it was released for iOS in 2012 and for Android in 2013. During the first six years, the developers implemented more than sixty updates. For example, they completely changed the in-game graphics in 2015. In addition, the number of levels increased from maximum of 38 levels to 90. In November 2019, the developers launched an in-game analog of the Season Pass called Professor's Experiments, which resulted in a one-time 22% increase in sales.

Reception

Review score
Publication	Score
Gamezebo	4/5

By 2016, the mobile game had over a million daily active users in China alone. The number of daily users worldwide exceeded 3.5 million in 2020. The audience was divided roughly equally between iOS and Android devices. By 2021, the game was downloaded more than 248 million times, the developer's profit, excluding the seller's commission, was more than 849 million. Together with Klondike Adventures by Vizor, Township makes up 40% of the addressable tycoon market.

Township has received mostly positive customer and critical reviews. Since 2013, Township, as well as other Playrix's games had consistently been rated as one of the Top 15 or Top 50 grossing charts in more than 50 countries worldwide. Township was named one of the Best Mac Games of the Year in 2014. Additionally, the game has been listed multiple times in the Top-50 grossing games for iPad and the Top 100 for iPhone.

== Advertisement criticism ==
Township, as with other games made by Playrix such as Homescapes and Gardenscapes: New Acres, has been criticized for advertisements displaying misleading images and scenes that are not related to or otherwise misrepresent the core gameplay. However, according to the Australian Council on Children and the Media, no advertising and product placement was found inside the game itself.
