= XTX Markets =

British algorithmic trading company

XTX Markets Limited
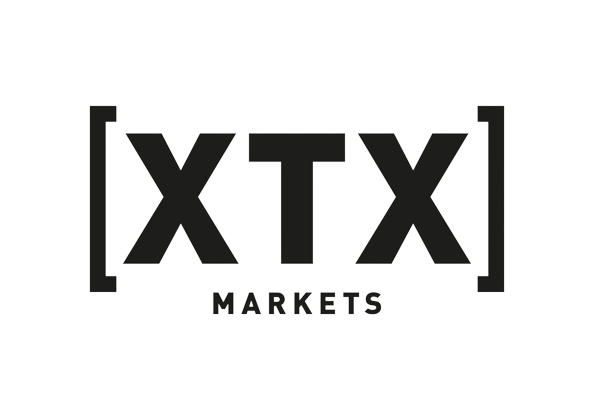

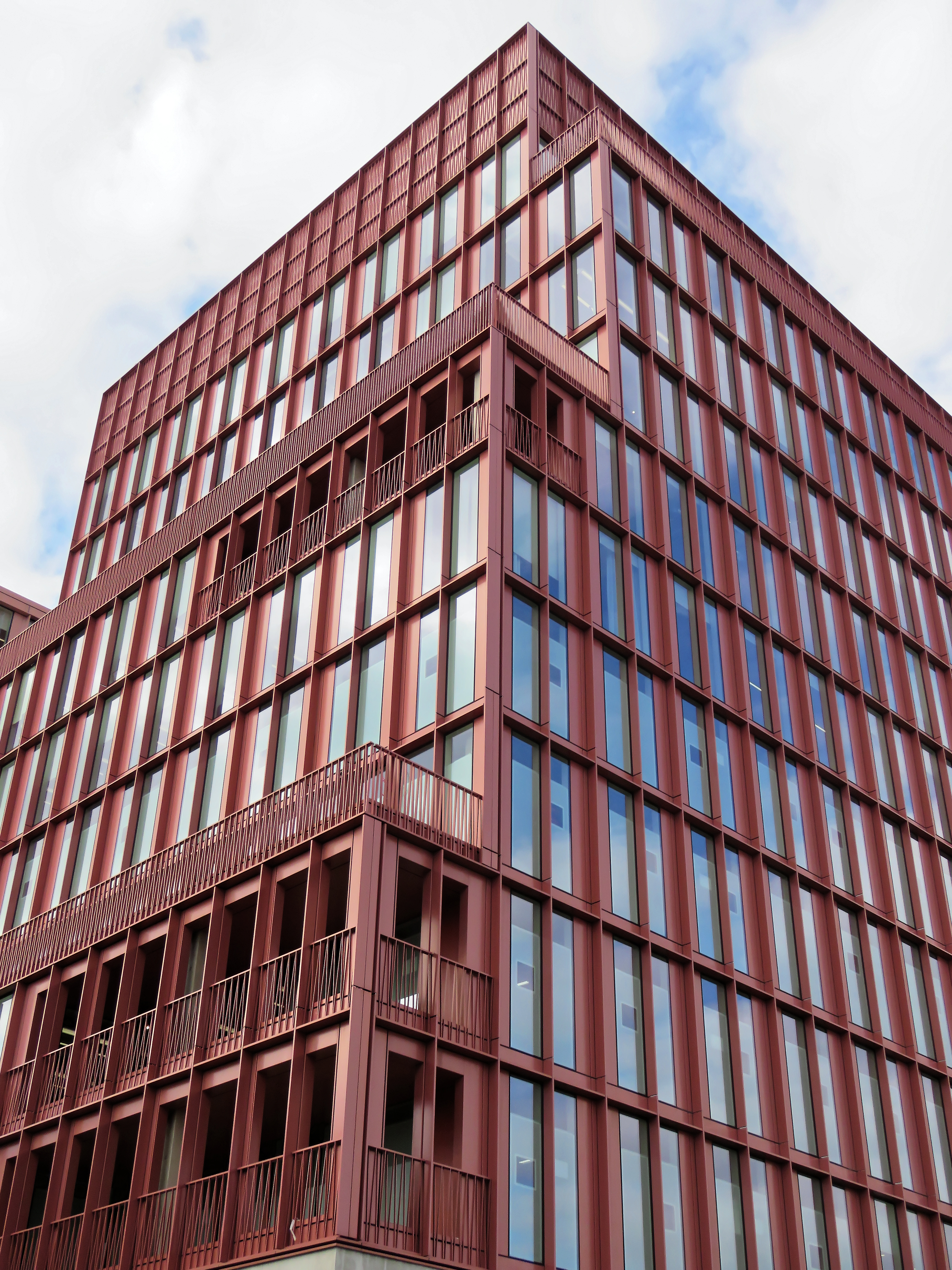
- Headquarters in London
- Type: Private
- Industry: Electronic liquidity provider
- Founded: 30 January 2015; 11 years ago
- Founder: Alex Gerko
- Headquarters: London, United Kingdom
- Products: Equities, foreign exchange, commodities, fixed income, derivatives
- Owner: Alex Gerko (75%)
- Number of employees: 300 (2026)
- Website: xtxmarkets.com

XTX Markets Limited is a British algorithmic trading company based in London. It was founded in January 2015 by Alexander Gerko, who is currently co-CEO alongside Hans Buehler. The company employs around 300 people globally (as of 2026) and uses state-of-the-art machine learning technology to produce price forecasts for over 50,000 financial instruments across equities, fixed income, currencies, commodities and crypto. It uses those forecasts to trade on exchanges and alternative trading venues, and to offer differentiated liquidity directly to clients worldwide. The firm trades over $250bn a day across 35 countries.

== History ==
The company is based in London, United Kingdom and was founded by Alexander Gerko in 2015, as a spin-off of GSA Capital.

In 2016, XTX Markets was the ninth-largest liquidity provider in the foreign exchange market by volume; with a 3.87% market share. It was the first time a company that is not a bank placed in the top ten of the Euromoney survey. It is part of a trend of non-bank traders taking market share from banks.

In July 2016, XTX Markets Limited became an FCA authorized investment firm.

In December 2017, XTX registered its first U.S. broker dealer, XTX Markets LLC. This followed the opening of the U.S. office in September 2017.

In January 2018, XTX Markets moved its headquarters to the R7 building in London's Kings Cross.

In January 2018, XTX Markets initiated the process to become a Systematic Internaliser following the implementation of MiFID II in order to provide liquidity to UK and EU clients in UK and EU equities markets.

In October 2018, following Brexit, XTX Markets chose Paris as its European base with the launch and authorisation of XTX Markets SAS. It trades European equity and future markets, as well as being a Systematic Internaliser in EU stocks for EU clients.

In 2018, XTX was the third-largest liquidity provider in the global foreign exchange market by volume; with a 7.36% market share. The company had 11.5% market share in European equity markets. Other activities included taking a stake in Aquis Exchange and setting up a foreign exchange 'pricing engine' in Singapore in conjunction with the Monetary Authority of Singapore.

In 2019, XTX Markets became the largest foreign exchange spot liquidity provider globally.

In 2019, the company grew its market share in the United States and expanded into providing liquidity in US equities.

In November 2019, XTX became the largest systematic internaliser by volume for European equities. XTX has since been the largest systematic internaliser for three years running.

In November 2020, XTX Markets publicly announced XTX Ventures, its venture capital arm investing in early-stage machine learning-driven companies.

In February 2021, XTX Markets launched XTX Direct, its Single Dealer Platform, via XTX Execution Services LLC, its second U.S. regulated broker dealer entity, allowing the firm to provide liquidity in equities bilaterally to U.S. clients.

In 2022, the company reported profits of £1.1 billion, a 64 percent increase on the previous year. It recorded a 68 percent increase in revenues from £1.5 billion to £2.5 billion.

In November 2023, XTX Markets launched the Artificial Intelligence Mathematical Olympiad Prize (AIMO), a $10mn challenge fund designed to spur the creation of a publicly shared AI model capable of winning a gold medal in the International Mathematical Olympiad (IMO).

== Philanthropy ==
Since 2017, XTX Markets has committed over £250 million to charities and non-profit partners, establishing the firm as a major philanthropic donor in the UK and globally. The firm’s philanthropy focuses on advancing mathematics education and research with the aim of supporting more students to progress to degrees, PhDs and highly-skilled careers in maths, especially those from low-income backgrounds. XTX Markets has also committed more than £25 million to support elite mathematics talent worldwide. More broadly, the firm’s giving also supports high-impact education programmes in low- and middle-income countries, humanitarian relief and local community initiatives.

XTX Markets has made over £50m in grants to UK charities and education institutions, including being the founding donor of the Maths Excellence Fund, the Martingale Foundation and the Observatory for Mathematical Education.

In March 2020, XTX donated over £20 million to charities fighting the effects of COVID-19 including NHS Charities Together, City Harvest and the AP-HP hospital.

XTX Markets released a statement in March 2022 regarding its support for the Ukrainian people and all those affected by the Russian invasion of Ukraine. This included details around £23.4 million of commitments to charities providing humanitarian relief to Ukraine.

In June 2022, XTX Markets announced the launch of its £15 million Academic Sanctuaries Fund with the goal of helping deliver more and better academic sanctuary places for students and researchers who have been forced to flee due to the war in Ukraine, including for voicing their opposition to it, but have no alternatives.

In 2023, XTX Markets donated over $10m for AI for maths, including launching the $10m AIMO Prize in partnership Kaggle.

In December 2024, Renaissance Philanthropy and XTX Markets launched the AI for Math Fund. The fund will commit $31.5 million to support the development of new AI tools, which will serve as long-term building blocks to advance mathematics.
