= Eipix Entertainment =

Serbian video game developer

- Company type: Subsidiary
- Industry: Video games
- Founded: 2005; 21 years ago
- Headquarters: Novi Sad, Serbia
- Key people: Mirko Topalski (CEO); Vladimir Živković (CCO); Adrian Đura (CTO)
- Parent: Playrix (2019–present)
- Website: eipix.com

Eipix Entertainment is a Serbian video game developer based in Novi Sad. The company was founded in 2005 and develops casual games for PC, Mac, iOS and Android, as well as virtual reality games. As of December 2019, Eipix is part of Playrix.

== History ==
Eipix Entertainment entered the game development business as an indie company. Early projects included the sci-fi race and shooter Pyroblazer and eco-themed puzzle adventure Ziro.

After several independent projects, Eipix began working as an outsourcing company, porting and making games for other developers.

In 2011, Eipix Entertainment went back to developing its own games, having shifted its focus towards casual games, mainly hidden object puzzle adventure (HOPA) titles, published through Big Fish Games.

Starting with Final Cut: Death on the Silver Screen Collector's Edition in 2012, Eipix has developed more than 80 HOPA titles. The company is currently developing sequels to hidden-object puzzle game franchises Mystery Case Files, Dark Parables, and Hidden Expedition, in addition to its original HOPA series as Final Cut, Dead Reckoning and Vermillion Watch

Eipix has also been entrusted with developing further sequels of the contemporary text-based game Lifeline, starting with Lifeline: Whiteout, also released by Big Fish Games.

Parallel to its work in the HOPA genre, Eipix also develops and publishes a variety of games. Free the Witch, the first Eipix-developed free-to-play game, was released in 2016 through Big Fish Games. Later in the same year, Eipix also became a self-publishing company, independently releasing its own games for a variety of mobile platforms. The company's first independent release was the free-to-play game Hoppy Land, published on the iTunes app store on August 31, 2016, followed by Nom Nom on October 4, 2016, and Spiny Core on December 16, 2016.

At the same time, Eipix began developing VR games. Althora, a VR puzzle adventure, was released on May 11, 2017, representing the first Eipix-developed VR game.

Path of Discovery: Europa, Eipix's first voice-controlled game intended for Amazon Alexa devices, was released on October 6, 2017.

In June 2018, Eipix announced a new core game called Walk the Fort developed by one of their divisions.

In December 2019, Eipix was acquired by publisher Playrix.

== Games ==
- Farm Slam
- Farm On!
- Free The Witch
- Lifeline: Whiteout
- Lifeline: Whiteout 2 (Cancelled)
- Lightstep: Chronicles
- Path of Discovery: Europa
- Althora
- Pyroblazer
- Final Cut series
- Amaranthine Voyage series
- Off The Record series
- Myths of the World series
- Fearful Tales series
- Sea of Lies series
- Hidden Expedition series
- Danse Macabre series
- Dead Reckoning series
- Dark Parables series
- Phantasmat series
- Mystery Case Files series
- Vermillion Watch
- Saga of the Nine Worlds series
- The Andersen Accounts series
- Memoirs of Murder series
- Haunted Manor series
- Dreadful Tales series

=== Hidden Expedition ===
The Hidden Expedition series is the first HOPA games that Eipix gained control of. Their games in the series are about a female explorer and spy who works for H.E.L.P., a society dedicated to the preservation of ancient treasures, civilizations and artifacts.

- Hidden Expedition: Smithsonian Hope Diamond (2013)
- Hidden Expedition: The Crown of Solomon (2014)
- Hidden Expedition: Smithsonian Castle (2014)
- Hidden Expedition: Dawn of Prosperity (2015)
- Hidden Expedition: The Fountain of Youth (2016)
- Hidden Expedition: Midgard's End (2016)
- Hidden Expedition: The Eternal Emperor (2016)
- Hidden Expedition: The Lost Paradise (2016)
- Hidden Expedition: The Pearl of Discord (2017)
- Hidden Expedition: The Curse of Mithridates (2017)
- Hidden Expedition: The Golden Secret (2018)
- Hidden Expedition: The Altar of Lies (2018)
- Hidden Expedition: Neptune's Gift (2019)

=== Dark Parables ===
Dark Parables is a franchise of casual hidden object games. The first seven episodes were produced by Blue Tea Games; Eipix Entertainment currently produces the sequels, starting with the eighth instalment. On the fourteenth instalment, Blue Tea Games has retaken control of the series, but Eipix stayed to help them with some programming.

- Dark Parables: The Little Mermaid and the Purple Tide (2014 - a joint production of Blue Tea Games and Eipix)
- Dark Parables: Queen of Sands (2015)
- Dark Parables: Goldilocks and the Fallen Star (2015)
- Dark Parables: The Swan Princess and the Dire Tree (2016)
- Dark Parables: The Thief and the Tinderbox (2016)
- Dark Parables: Requiem for the Forgotten Shadow (2017)
- Dark Parables: Portrait of the Stained Princess (2019)

== Imagine Incredible ==
In 2016, Eipix co-founded Imagine Incredible, a project dedicated to in-house production and physical and digital distribution of comic books.

Lightstep Chronicles, the first comic book series from the Imagine Incredible roster, was successfully funded on Kickstarter in 2017. A video-game based on the comic book was approved for funding by the Creative Europe's MEDIA Programme and is currently being developed by Eipix Entertainment.
