= Michael Platt (financier) =

British billionaire hedge fund manager (born 1968)

- Born: 18 March 1968 (age 58); Preston, England
- Education: London School of Economics
- Occupations: Investor and fund manager
- Known for: Co-founding BlueCrest Capital Management
- Title: CEO, BlueCrest Capital Management
- Website: https://www.bluecrestcapital.com/

Michael Edward Platt (born 18 March 1968) is a British billionaire hedge fund manager. He is the co-founder and managing director of BlueCrest Capital Management, Europe's third-largest hedge-fund firm which he co-founded in 2000. He is Britain's wealthiest hedge fund manager according to Forbes, with an estimated wealth of US$18 billion as of December 2024.

== Early life ==
Platt was born in Preston, Lancashire, England in 1968. His father taught civil engineering at the University of Manchester. His mother was a university administrator. His grandmother, whom he has described as "a serious equity trader," introduced him to investment. She "helped him buy stock in trust savings banks that were selling shares to the public." At the age of 14, he invested £500 in a shipping line, Common Brothers, that soon tripled in price. Some of his first investments were in Britain's newly privatised utilities.

He studied civil engineering at Imperial College London, but after a year, switched to mathematics and economics at the London School of Economics, from which he graduated in 1991.

== Investment career ==
=== Early career ===
Platt started in the City after his grandmother gave him some shares in which to invest and he discovered he had a talent for investing.

He joined JP Morgan in 1991. Platt assumed responsibility for developing JP Morgan's swaps and options trading business in April 1992, and in April 1996, became the head of trading for all swaps products relating to the 11 founding states of the European single currency, the euro. In 2000 Platt co-founded BlueCrest Capital Management LLP, with William Reeves.

=== BlueCrest Capital ===
Discerning in August 2007 that "a stock market crash lay ahead," Platt "sold his bank shares, and bought ‘safe’ sovereign bonds," and thus "avoided the worst of the financial crisis, and profited from the resulting 'flight to quality' and plunge in interest rates."

In 2011, Platt discussed the crisis in the Eurozone, attributing it to "the cultural and political divide" between north and south. "The reality is that there is no willingness within the Eurozone to share wealth," he said. "In the United States, if California is having a really difficult time, the rest of the United States will send money to California. This is not the case in Europe." He further maintained that Europe's problem was that "almost every part of it has gone wrong now. The banks are undercapitalized…If banks were hedge funds, and you mark them to market properly, I would say that probably most of them are insolvent." By contrast, he was relatively positive about the U.S. and Germany.

In December 2015, Platt announced that BlueCrest would return $7 billion for outside investors, take no outside money in the future, and become a private partnership. In his letter to investors explaining the change, Platt explained that "Recent developments in the industry, including, among other things, downward pressure on fee levels, the increasing cost of hiring the best portfolio management talent and the difficulty in tailoring investment products to meet the individual needs and constraints of a large number of diverse investors, have all significantly reduced industry profitability and flexibility." Consequently "BlueCrest believes that a transition to a Private Investment Partnership model is now appropriate for the business."

In 2016, BlueCrest had a profit of almost 50 percent; in 2017, Platt "led his private investment firm to a 54 percent gain." This contrasted with "mediocre returns at some of the largest hedge funds in the world," noted Bloomberg News. In 2018, the Sunday Times named Platt "the richest hedge fund manager in the City." During the year, his net wealth had grown by 25 percent. In March 2019, he was named one of the highest-earning hedge fund managers and traders by Forbes. In 2019 BlueCrest's trading operation returned 53.5% net after expenses and made Platt approximately $2 billion. BlueCrest posted a 95 percent gain in 2020, it swelled Platt's net worth to $10 billion. In 2023, the Sunday Times Rich List estimated his net worth at £11.50 billion.

== Personal life ==
In 2010, he moved from London to Geneva, Switzerland to avoid increased regulation. In 2014, it was reported that he had relocated to Jersey, along with his hedge fund, which was moving from nearby Guernsey, for tax purposes and "better staffing options".

He is a notable art collector having built a contemporary art collection not by shopping for pictures, but by commissioning them from well-known artists. He has a private showroom in the crypt of a deconsecrated church at One Marylebone, which displays a selection of art by, among others, taxidermist Polly Morgan, the Turner Prize-winning sculptor and installation artist Keith Tyson and Reece Jones "an artist who works mainly in charcoal".

Platt appeared as himself on Showtime's series Billions in episode 1, Season 3.
