= Philip Beresford =

British journalist

Philip Beresford was the compiler of the Sunday Times Rich List, which is compiled in January every year featuring the richest 1,000 people in the United Kingdom. He retired in 2016. Beresford also does interviews and news stories with influential people. He is known as an expert on charitable giving by the wealthy.
