= Gardenscapes: New Acres =

Mobile video game

- iOS icon depicting the protagonist, Austin the Butler
- Developer: Playrix
- Publisher: Playrix
- Series: Scapes
- Platforms: Android, iOS, iPadOS, Facebook Platform
- Release: Android: NA: July 5, 2016; iOS: NA: August 25, 2016
- Genre: Puzzle
- Mode: Single-player

Gardenscapes: New Acres is a casual, narrative, match-3 game, released in 2016 for Android and iOS devices and also on Facebook.

== Gameplay ==
The original version of Gardenscapes, which was released for Microsoft Windows in October 2009, and was later released on OS X, iOS, Android, the Nintendo DS and 3DS, was a hidden objects game in which the player runs a B&B hotel. Two sequels, Gardenscapes 2, which was released in April 2013, and Gardenscapes – Mansion Makeover are also part of the series.

According to VentureBeat, a mobile version was in development for over four years and was released in 2016 as a combination of match-3 gameplay with a city-building core. The storyline is centered on a butler named Austin, who strives to rebuild the dilapidated mansion and garden. To complete the chores, the user must complete levels and earn the required "stars". Gardenscapes allows players to choose decorations for cleaned-up areas of a massively overgrown garden as they level up. The core gameplay is completed with occasional pin-pulling mini-games in which players need to solve puzzles to save characters.

Playrix regularly releases seasonal updates, for example, Christmas Collaterals. In addition, in 2021, they launched Yoga Season in collaboration with the World Health Organization. The storyline describes recommendations on how to stay healthy while self-isolating.

== Commercial and sequels ==
The player needs to match three of the same items in either vertically or horizontally to clear the fruits. The player may use the Power-Ups to ease their gameplay.

After the release, Gardenscapes was named one of the Top-10 free games for iPhone and iPad in 100 countries. The project was released not only on the App Store, where on the first day it was downloaded more than a million times but also on Google Play and Amazon Appstore. Gardenscapes was named by Facebook its Overall Game of the Year for 2016. As a result, the developers entered the Top-20 mobile publishers in the world. During the 20th Annual D.I.C.E. Awards, the Academy of Interactive Arts & Sciences nominated Gardenscapes for "Mobile Game of the Year".

By 2019, Gardenscapes was named the fifth highest-grossing puzzle game, generating $1.5 billion from in-app purchases. The total number of app installs exceeded 213 million. An average revenue per install was about $7, making it one of the lead publisher's games. Google Play users have accounted for 70 percent of Gardenscapes' downloads and contributed 47 percent of overall revenue.

During the COVID-19 pandemic, Gardenscapes' audience was over 10 million daily active players. Sensor Tower estimated that Gardenscapes made almost $2 billion in lifetime revenue by 2021. According to Statista, as of May 2021, the game remained the Playrix's most downloaded product with over 461.41 million total downloads. Gardenscapes would then generate $1.5 billion in revenue, from 2022-2024 alone.

The success of the original game led to a series of sequels, such as Gardenscapes 2. A year after the release of Gardenscapes in 2016, the developers also launched another project, Homescapes, in which the main character returns to his childhood mansion and tries to restore it.

== Advertisement criticism ==
Advertisements for Gardenscapes have been criticized for misrepresenting the game, showing pull-the-pin puzzles rather than the core match-3 gameplay. These advertisements for Fishdom, Gardenscapes, Homescapes, and other Playrix games were referred to as misleading and "not representative" at the beginning of 2020. Developers declared that the promoted images captured the mini-games available every 20 levels. However, such mini-games were found to take an extensive amount of gameplay time to reach. The Advertising Standards Authority banned banners in October 2020 and warned Playrix about the representativity of other campaigns. Similar criticism of advertising tactics occurred with another of Playrix's games, Township.
