= BlueCrest Capital Management =

British Investment Firm

- Type: Private
- Industry: Investment management
- Founded: 2000; 26 years ago
- Founders: Michael Platt; William Reeves
- Headquarters: London, United Kingdom
- Number of employees: 600 (2015)
- Website: bluecrestcapital.com

BlueCrest Capital Management is a British investment management firm founded in 2000 by Michael Platt and William Reeves. Originally launched as a multi-strategy hedge fund, the firm returned external capital in 2015 and converted into a family office. The firm previously spun out its systematic trading arm as Systematica Investments in 2014. The firm maintains office locations in London, Jersey, Singapore and New York.

== History ==
Bluecrest was founded in 2000 as a hedge fund by Michael Platt and William Reeves who were both previously senior proprietary traders at JPMorgan Chase.

In 2014, Bluecrest spun off $8.2 billion worth of assets into a new company, Systematica Investments, run by Bluecrest employee, Leda Braga. CNBC has referred to Braga as "the most powerful woman in Hedge Funds", earning in excess of $50 million annually.

In 2015, Bluecrest returned all outside capital to investors and transitioned into a family office, which is a private investment partnership that manages money only for its partners and employees.

The fund generated returns of 50% in 2016, 54% in 2017, 25% in 2018 when the average hedge fund lost money, and 50% in 2019.

In March 2020, BlueCrest reduced the size of its relative-value trading book, which seeks to exploit anomalies in related securities. The company also cut risk across the firm by about $1 billion. BlueCrest suffered some losses after the sell-off, but the investment fund was up for the year through the close of trading on 11 March.

BlueCrest continued expanding its trading teams after becoming a family office, hiring additional portfolio managers across macro and relative-value strategies beginning in 2020.

On 8 December 2020, The U.S. Securities and Exchange Commission announced that BlueCrest had agreed to pay $170 million to settle charges arising from inadequate disclosures, material misstatements, and misleading omissions concerning its transfer of top traders from its flagship client fund, BlueCrest Capital International (BCI), to a proprietary fund, BSMA Limited, and replacement of those traders with an underperforming algorithm.

The fund generated returns of 153% in 2022, 20% in 2023 and 38% in 2024.
