= Playrix =

Video game development company

Playrix Holding Ltd.
- Type: Private
- Industry: Video game industry
- Founded: 2004; 22 years ago
- Founders: Dmitry Bukhman; Igor Bukhman
- Headquarters: Dublin, Ireland
- Revenue: $1.83 billion (2023)
- Number of employees: 3000 (2023)
- Website: playrix.com

Playrix Holding Ltd., also known as Playrix Entertainment and Playrix Games, is an Irish developer of free-to-play mobile games behind titles such as Township, Fishdom, Homescapes, and Gardenscapes. The company was founded in 2004 by brothers Dmitry Bukhman and Igor Bukhman and is headquartered in Dublin, Ireland.

Playrix was valued at $8 billion in 2021. As of 2023, Playrix was the third-biggest mobile game developer in the world in terms of revenue.

== History ==
=== Founding of Playrix ===
Before the company Playrix was founded, the brothers Igor and Dmitry Bukhman developed several simple computer games together while they were still students. Their first game was called Xonix, which the brothers developed on a computer with a Pentium 100 processor. The game was released in 2001, after a one-month development period. They released Discovera later that year, which was similar to the game Xonix. The brothers set its price at $15 and uploaded it to two hundred app catalogs. The game brought in $60 in its first month. Six months later, the Bukhman brothers released their second game, which brought their monthly revenue up to $200 and allowed them to buy a second computer. They released another game six months after that and started selling screensavers that they bought from programmers.

By 2004, Igor and Dmitry Bukhman had released three games and 30 screensavers, bringing their earnings to $10,000 a month for the first time. They officially founded Playrix, rented an office in Vologda, western Russia, and hired ten employees. Initially, the company mainly designed simple puzzle games for home computers. By the end of 2007, the company had released around 15 casual games and its first PC game, reaching a monthly revenue of $300,000.

=== Company growth through mobile games ===
In 2009, Playrix became interested in developing free-to-play games for mobile phones, while continuing to create PC games. The mobile games developer, Perfect Play Studio, with studios in Moscow mainly and Bryansk, was founded in 2009 as WebGames, entered the market in 2010, and later changed its name to Perfect Play in 2020. It is a part of Playrix.

In 2012, the Playrix launched its first game on Facebook—Township. The game became one of the top 50 grossing games on Facebook with 350,000 daily active users. A year later, Township became the company’s first-ever game to be released on iOS and later on Android. Over the next seven years, the game would be downloaded about 250 million times.

In April 2013, Playrix moved its headquarters to Dublin. The company started working remotely in 2015, and by 2016 it had more employees working remotely than at its central office.

At the end of April 2015, the company announced the release of its second free-to-play mobile game—Fishdom: Deep Dive. Playrix then released Gardenscapes (2016) and Homescapes (2017). The former brought the company $1.5 billion in revenue by the end of 2019. The company later released two more games—Wildscapes (2019) and Manor Matters (2019).

According to App Annie, in September 2016, the company became the highest-grossing mobile game developer in the CIS and Baltic states region, the second in Europe in terms of revenue, and ranked in the Top 20 biggest mobile game developers in the world. In August 2017, the company became the leading mobile game publisher in Europe based on revenue from Google Play and the App Store.

=== Acquisitions and new developments ===
At the beginning of 2018, the Bukhman brothers considered selling the company but ultimately decided to invest in other video game companies instead. In 2018, Playrix acquired a 43% stake in Nexters, one of Europe's largest video game developers. In 2018, Playrix became the 9th highest-grossing game publisher globally on iOS and Android.

In 2019, Playrix made approximately $1.7 billion. About $100 million was spent buying shares in European game studios. In August 2019, Playrix invested in the Belarusian company Vizor Games. In October of the same year, Playrix bought the Ukrainian company Zagrava Games and integrated the Russian game developer Stargaze into the company as well, renaming it Zefir Games. That December, they acquired the Serbian company Eipix Entertainment.

In May 2020, Playrix acquired the Armenian studio Plexonic and the Croatian studio Cateia Games that June. As a result of this focus on acquisitions, the company grew at a rapid pace. As of 2020, more than 2,500 people were employed by Playrix in 25 offices around the world. In March 2021, the company bought the Ukrainian studio Boolat Games.

In 2022, the company announced its intention to withdraw from the Russian and Belarusian markets and subsequently closed its Russian offices, due to the ongoing Russian invasion of Ukraine. Employees from affected countries were relocated to other regions.

== Company structure ==
Playrix is based in Dublin, Ireland and is owned and managed by Igor and Dmitry Bukhman. In the 2023 financial year, Playrix generated revenue of around $1.83 billion. The largest sales markets are the USA, China, and Japan.

Playrix employs over 3,000 people internationally and has office branches in Ireland, Serbia, Cyprus, Armenia, Kazakhstan, and Ukraine.

== Finances ==
During the COVID-19 pandemic in 2020, Playrix reported an increase in downloads and profits. In response to the pandemic, in April 2020, Playrix paid each of their 2,100 employees an additional one-off payment of $650 to aid in financial support.

In 2020, according to App Annie, Gardenscapes and Fishdom were downloaded 190 million and 120 million times respectively. As a result, Playrix’s earnings from downloads and in-game purchases increased to $1.75 billion in just eight months. Profits from ads accounted for only 3% of the company’s total earnings. The number of monthly active players also increased to 180 million. As of 2021 the company's valuation was €8 billion or about $8.5 billion in 2024 dollars. Playrix was the fourth-largest mobile game developer in the world based on revenue, earning $2.7 billion in 2021.

In April 2019, Igor and Dmitry Bukhman first appeared in the Bloomberg Billionaires Index. Their net worth was $1.4 billion each. According to the Bloomberg Billionaires Index, as of September 2020, each brother's share was worth $3.9 billion. In the Sunday Times Rich List 2025 ranking of the wealthiest people in the UK, the Bukhman brothers were placed 10th with an estimated joint fortune of £12.54 billion.

== Games ==
=== Current games ===
Year	Title	Microsoft Store	macOS	Android	iOS and iPadOS	Facebook Platform	Amazon	Galaxy Store	BlackBerry World
2012	Township	Yes	Yes	Yes	Yes	Yes	Yes	Yes	No
2016	Fishdom	Yes	Yes	Yes	Yes	Yes	Yes	Yes	No
2016	Gardenscapes: New Acres	Yes	Yes	Yes	Yes	Yes	Yes	Yes	Yes
2017	Homescapes	Yes	Yes	Yes	Yes	Yes	Yes	Yes	Yes
2019	Wildscapes	Yes	Yes	Yes	Yes	No	No	No	No
2019	Manor Matters	Yes	No	Yes	Yes	No	No	No	No
2023	Mystery Matters	No	No	Yes	Yes	No	No	No	No
2024	Fishdom: Solitaire	No	No	Yes	Yes	No	Yes	No	No
2024	Aqua Match	No	Yes	Yes	Yes	No	Yes	No	No

=== Legacy and closed games ===
- 4 Elements
- 4 Elements II
- Around the World in 80 Days
- Atlantis Quest
- Rise of Atlantis
- Call of Atlantis
- The Path of Hercules
- Call of the Ages
- Royal Envoy
- Royal Envoy 2
- Royal Envoy 3
- Royal Envoy: Campaign for the Crown
- Brickshooter Egypt
- Fishdom
- Fishdom H2O: Hidden Odyssey
- Fishdom 2
- Fishdom: Spooky Splash
- Fishdom: Harvest Splash
- Fishdom: Frosty Splash
- Fishdom 3
- Aquascapes
- Fishdom: The Depths of Time
- Pocket Fishdom
- Gardenscapes
- Gardenscapes: Mansion Makeover
- Gardenscapes 2
- Farmscapes
- Barn Yarn

== Criticism ==
Playrix has been criticised for its use of deceptive or false advertisements on mobile advertisement platforms such as AdMob. Advertisements for many of their games like Township, Fishdom, Gardenscapes, and Homescapes display gameplay that does not represent the actual gameplay of the product in question. In September 2020, the United Kingdom's Advertising Standards Authority ruled that two advertisements for Homescapes and Gardenscapes were misleading and "must not appear again in the form complained of".

Playrix was criticised by some employees after it removed discussion of the February 24, 2022 Russian invasion of Ukraine from Slack. During the days following the invasion, the company deleted Slack posts by Ukrainian employees about the war. The company shut down Slack channels on March 3, 2022 after "outbursts of uncontrolled hatred between employees." Co-founder Igor Bukhman defended the decision, and told Forbes, "The only thing we're asking of our employees during this crisis is that they keep our few official work channels solely for business communication."

Hours after the invasion, Playrix put its approximately 1,500 Ukrainian-based staff on paid leave, and in the following days the company provided hotlines to help Ukrainian employees evacuate the country. By February 28, Playrix gave its 4,000 employees, including the 1,500 in Russia, a bonus equivalent to a month's salary.

On March 11, 2022, Playrix's Ukraine-based subsidiary Hit Games donated $500,000 to the Ukrainian Red Cross.

In October 2022, Playrix announced it was closing its offices and development operations in Russia and Belarus due to the war in Ukraine.

== Awards (Selection) ==
- 2016: Facebook Game of the Year for Gardenscapes.
- 2018: Mobile Game Award in the category Best Game Management & Live Ops for Gardenscapes.
