= Homescapes =

2017 video game

- App icon, featuring the protagonist of the game, Austin, with his cat
- Developer: Playrix
- Publisher: Playrix
- Series: Scapes
- Platforms: Android, iOS, iPadOS, Microsoft Windows, macOS
- Release: Apple App Store; September 2017; Google Play; August 2017; Amazon Appstore; September 2017; Microsoft Store; August 2017
- Genre: Puzzle
- Mode: Single-player

Homescapes is a casual free-to-play puzzle game. It was developed and launched by Playrix in 2017 as a spiritual successor to their 2016 match-3 game, Gardenscapes. The storyline narrates attempts by the game's protagonist, Austin the Butler, to restore his childhood home. The game is available on Apple's App Store for iOS and macOS, and also on Android via Google Play, Amazon Appstore, or Huawei AppGallery. It is also available for Windows on the Microsoft Store.

== Gameplay ==
Homescapes follows the adventure of the main character Austin who returns to his childhood mansion and begins to restore it. He tries to convince his parents not to sell the house by sprucing up the place. To help him, players receive tasks in the To-do list that they can tackle by solving match-3 puzzles. These tasks can range from installing new stairs and restoring the statues in the main hall to petting a cat. Completing every puzzle level, players receive in-game currency and a Star reward that is necessary to complete tasks. Coins are needed to buy lives and power-ups for puzzle levels or customize the mansion with more than 100,000 design patterns. Players can pick out wallpaper, furniture, and other decorations.

Homescapes' gameplay is similar to its predecessor, Gardenscapes. A board of each puzzle includes colorful tiles—teacups, books, bowties, buttons, lamps, teapots, and others. A player swaps two adjacent items to match three or more of them. However, Playrix added unique power-ups for the Gardenscapes' spin-off. Level 8 unlocks the Hammer, which destroys a random single tile. Rockets become available after level 14 and appear after matching four tiles in a row or a column. They cause a fire across the board, removing all tiles vertically or horizontally. The Bomb is given after matching five items and blows up tiles in a two-square radius. The Paper Plane is used to delete random distant tiles. After matching five tiles, a player can get the Rainbow Ball, which removes all tiles of the same color. Boosters and their combinations become available to the player as they gain experience and help a player to achieve level's victory conditions faster. Those goals usually involve collecting or deleting tiles of a certain color or in a certain amount. For example, completing a level where a spread Carpet onto every tile should be done, a player needs to match tiles on Carpet with the rest. To make the game more challenging, obstacle tiles appear on a level board (wafer cookies, carpet, boxes, yellow apples, and cherries encased in jelly, etc.).

After release, the game was repeatedly updated, one of the first add-ons was a Daily bonus. In the following years, developers have built a robust framework of recurring events or available for a limited period mini-games such as Flying High, Cake o’clock, Paper Plane Generator, Flint's Adventure, and others. Overall, Homescapes had 7390 match-3 levels and 10 mini-games in September 2021.

Gameplay combines match-3 challenges with a visual novel. In an 18-month development period, three protagonists and over 30 supporting characters were created, whose stories appear along the game process. Leveling up by solving challenges, a player unlocks new chapters of a story and watches how Austin interacts with his parents and childhood friends; he also receives letters from them with bonuses. As of November 27, 2021, it had 7921 levels

Homescapes was originally released under the name of Gardenscapes: Mansion Makeover in March 2012. Similar to its predecessor, it was a hidden-object game, but shared a similar story to the current version.

== Reception ==
Homescapes was soft-launched on July 26, 2017, in Canada. In the first week after the worldwide release, the game had 28 million downloads. It topped the list of Free games for iPad in 60 countries; for iPhone in 30 countries. Moreover, the puzzle topped the Free Google Play Games chart in 45 countries. Analysts from Sensor Tower estimated the game's revenue "in less than a month" at $10 million.

App Annie analytic platform claimed Homescapes as the 4th most downloaded game on iOS worldwide and the 8th most downloaded on Android in October 2017. By the end of 2019, the lifetime revenue of the game exceeded $1 billion, of which 56% were distributed by App Store users. The key markets for Homescapes were the United States, Japan, and Germany.

GameZebo named Homescapes among the 10 Best Casual Games for Mobile in 2021. The same year, inspired by the game, Russian singer Zemfira composed a song and released a video clip, which was shot in collaboration with Playrix.

The game received mostly positive reviews, although some critics found it less attractive and more challenging than the original Gardenscapes due to lack of bonuses and low coin rewards. Moreover, according to Polygon the Butler's actions in the game resembles a passive-aggressive campaign to rebuild the house, pressuring his parents into keeping the house.

== Advertisement criticism ==
At the beginning of 2020, Facebook advertisements for Homescapes depicted puzzle games where the user had to pull pins in a specific order to prevent a character's death. These were referred to the UK's Advertising Standards Authority for being misleading and "not representative of the overall gameplay", which generally involves colorful match-3 puzzles. The developers insisted that the advertisements showed ten genuine mini-games which appeared occasionally within the game's thousands of levels, and that "most users" had stopped playing the game before encountering them on the "distant levels". The game was later altered to put these mini-games closer to the start of the game.

The UK Advertising Standards Authority banned some advertisements in October 2020 and warned Playrix about the representativity of further campaigns. Similar criticism of advertising tactics occurred with Gardenscapes: New Acres and Township, two games also made by Playrix.
