= List of British billionaires by net worth =

This is a list of British billionaires by net worth, based on an annual assessment of wealth and assets compiled by Bloomberg, The Sunday Times, and by Forbes magazine. The lists are incomplete.

== 2026 British billionaire list by Forbes magazine ==
Date: 10th March 2026

World rank	Name	Net worth (USD)	Source of wealth
120	Michael Platt	20.9 billion	BlueCrest Capital Management
150	Nik Storonsky	18.8 billion	Revolut
153	Jim Ratcliffe	18.4 billion	Ineos
193	James Dyson	15 billion	Dyson
223	Simon Reuben	13.3 billion	Reuben Brothers
223	David Reuben	13.3 billion	Reuben Brothers
255	Alexander Gerko	12 billion	XTX Markets
262	Christopher Hohn	11.8 billion	The Children’s Investment Fund
341	Anthony Bamford & family	10 billion	JCB
444	Denise Coates	8.1 billion	bet365
567	Joe Lewis	7 billion	Tavistock Group
588	Clive Calder	6.9 billion	Jive Records
684	Tom Morris	6.1 billion	Home Bargains
684	John Reece	6.1 billion	Ineos
684	Andrew Currie	6.1 billion	Ineos
730	Michael Ashley	5.7 billion	Frasers Group
806	Ian Livingstone	5.3 billion	London & Regional Properties
806	Richard Livingstone	5.3 billion	London & Regional Properties
954	Laurence Graff & family	4.5 billion	Graff Diamonds
1011	John Caudwell	4.2 billion	Phones 4u
1074	Hilton Schlosberg & family	4 billion	Monster Beverage
1163	Peter Hargreaves	3.7 billion	Hargreaves Lansdown
1285	Alan Howard	3.3 billion	Brevan Howard
1325	Maritsa Lazari & family	3.2 billion	Lazari Investments
1376	John Coates	3.1 billion	bet365
1325	Bernard Lewis & family	2.8 billion	River Island
1325	Richard Branson	2.8 billion	Virgin Group
1560	Farhad Moshiri	2.7 billion	Metalloinvest, MegaFon
1560	Anthony Langley	2.7 billion	Langley Holdings
1611	Bernie Ecclestone & family	2.6 billion	Formula One Group
1611	Andrey Andreev	2.6 billion	Bumble, Badoo
1676	Alex Beard	2.5 billion	Glencore
1834	Chris Rokos	2.3 billion	Rokos Capital Management
1913	Dennis Gillings	2.2 billion	IQVIA
1982	Mark Coombs	2.1 billion	Ashmore Group
1982	Simon Nixon	2.1 billion	MoneySuperMarket
1982	John Bloor	2.1 billion	Bloor Homes, Triumph Motorcycles Ltd
2052	Ian Wood & family	2 billion	John Wood Group
2052	Robert Warren Miller	2 billion	DFS Group
2052	Richard Desmond	2 billion	Northern & Shell
2052	Michael Ashcroft	2 billion	ADT Inc.
2052	Stephen Rubin & family	2 billion	Pentland Group
2177	Will Adderley	1.9 billion	Dunelm Group
2600	Mark Dixon	1.9 billion	International Workplace Group
2712	Saket Burman	1.4 billion	Dabur
2712	Philip Green	1.4 billion	Arcadia Group
2712	Tina Green	1.4 billion	Arcadia Group
2712	Michael Spencer	1.4 billion	NEX Group
2858	Mo Ibrahim	1.3 billion	Celtel
2858	Kenneth Lo	1.3 billion	Crystal Group
3017	Ben Francis	1.2 billion	Gymshark
3017	John Christodoulou	1.2 billion	Yianis Group
3017	J. K. Rowling	1.2 billion	Harry Potter
3185	Peter Kelly	1.1 billion	Softcat
3185	Donald Mackenzie	1.1 billion	CVC Capital Partners

== 2025 British billionaire list by The Sunday Times ==
	Net worth (GBP)	Source of wealth
Hinduja family	35 billion	Diversified global conglomerate businesses
David and Simon Reuben and family	27 billion	Metals, real estate, investments
Sir Leonard Blavatnik	26 billion	Russian oil, aluminum, media investments
Sir James Dyson and family	21 billion	Household appliances innovation and sales
Idan Ofer	20 billion	Shipping and energy conglomerates
Guy, George, Alannah and Galen Weston and family	18 billion	Food, retail, and real estate
Sir Jim Ratcliffe	17 billion	Chemicals (INEOS founder)
Lakshmi Mittal and family	15 billion	Steel and mining conglomerate
John Fredriksen and family	14 billion	Shipping and oil tankers
Michael Flacks	1.681 billion	Flacks Group

== See also ==
- Forbes list of billionaires
- List of countries by the number of billionaires
- Sunday Times Rich List
