= Rokos =

Rokos may refer to:

- Chris Rokos (born 1970), British hedge fund manager
- Drew Rokos, Australian comedian
- Rokos Capital Management, a fund manager founded by Chris Rokos
- Rokos School of Government, a planned school of the University of Cambridge, named after Chris Rokos
