= Department of Politics and International Studies, University of Cambridge =

University department in England

Department of Politics and International Studies
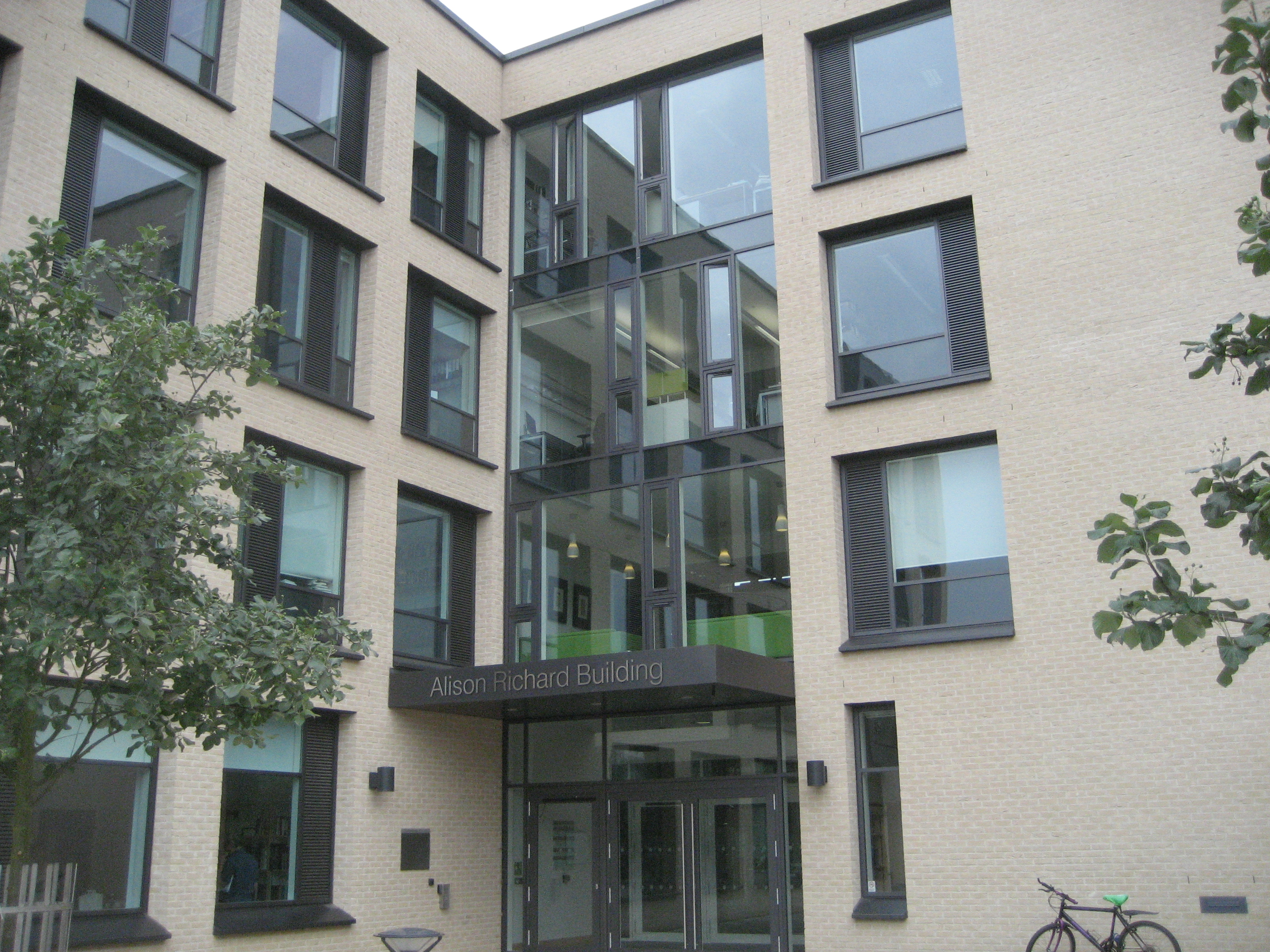
- The Alison Richard Building, in which the department is located
- Parent institution: Faculty of Human, Social, and Political Science
- Affiliations: University of Cambridge
- Head of Department: Jude Browne (2021- )
- Undergraduates: 612
- Postgraduates: 439
- Location: Cambridge, England
- Business Operations Manager: Helen Reynolds (2024 - )
- Website: www.polis.cam.ac.uk

The Department of Politics and International Studies at the University of Cambridge (abbreviated POLIS) is the department at the University of Cambridge responsible for research and instruction in political science, international relations and public policy. It is part of the Faculty of Human, Social, and Political Science.

== History ==
The inductive study of political science at Cambridge was pioneered in the 19th century by John Robert Seeley. In 1928, the Rockefeller Foundation endowed the university's first chair in political science, which was situated in the Faculty of History and inaugurally held by Ernest Barker. The Social and Political Sciences Committee was formed in 1970 as an early attempt to unify research and instruction in political science at the university and, in 2004, the Department of Politics was established.

POLIS, formed in 2009 by the merger of the former Department of Politics and the Centre for International Studies, is administratively housed at the university's Alison Richard Building on the Sidgwick Site.

In 2016, POLIS PhD student Giulio Regeni was killed while carrying out research in Cairo, Egypt.

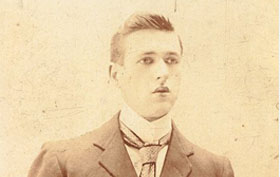
The first chair in political science at Cambridge, endowed by the Rockefeller Foundation, was held by Ernest Barker.

=== Heads of department ===
- Geoffrey Hawthorn (Founder)
- Andrew Gamble (2009-12)
- Christopher J. Hill (2012-14)
- David Runciman (2014-18)
- Jason Sharman (2018-21)
- Jude Browne (2021- )

== Degrees and reputation ==
=== Degrees ===
Politics and International Studies are taught at the undergraduate level through either the Human, Social, and Political Sciences Tripos or the History and Politics Tripos. At the postgraduate level, the department offers nine Masters' programmes and four PhD programmes.

University rankings
- University of Cambridge

Global – Liberal arts
- QS Politics: 7 (2024)

=== Reputation ===
The department has been ranked top in the UK for the teaching of politics by the 2025 Complete University Guide and second in the 2025 Best UK universities for politics. The 2025 edition of the QS World University Rankings ranked Cambridge seventh in the world for the study of politics and the 2025 Times Higher Education World University Rankings ranked it fifth. Its masters and doctoral programmes have been ranked among the 25 "Best International Relations Schools in the World" by Foreign Policy. In the 2021 UK government Research Excellence Framework (REF) exercise, the department was ranked 21st out of 56 institutions.

== Academic and research centres ==
The peer-reviewed journal Cambridge Review of International Affairs is published by Taylor & Francis in academic affiliation with the department.

Seven specialised centres are housed within the department.

Centre	Focus	Director(s)	Official website	Reference(s)
Cambridge Centre for Political Thought	Political theory	Duncan Bell, Richard Bourke, Annabel Brett, Duncan Kelly	polthought.cam.ac.uk	
Centre for Gender Studies	Gender studies	Lauren Wilcox	gender.cam.ac.uk	
Centre of African Studies	African studies	Adam Branch	african.cam.ac.uk	
Centre of Development Studies	Development studies	Graham Denyer Willis	devstudies.cam.ac.uk	
Centre of Governance and Human Rights	Human rights, Social justice	Ella McPherson, Sharath Srinivasan	cghr.polis.cam.ac.uk/	
Centre of Latin American Studies	Latin American studies	Pedro Mendes Loureiro	latin-american.cam.ac.uk	
Centre of South Asian Studies	South Asian studies	Shailaja Fennell	s-asian.cam.ac.uk	

== Notable people ==
=== Alumni ===
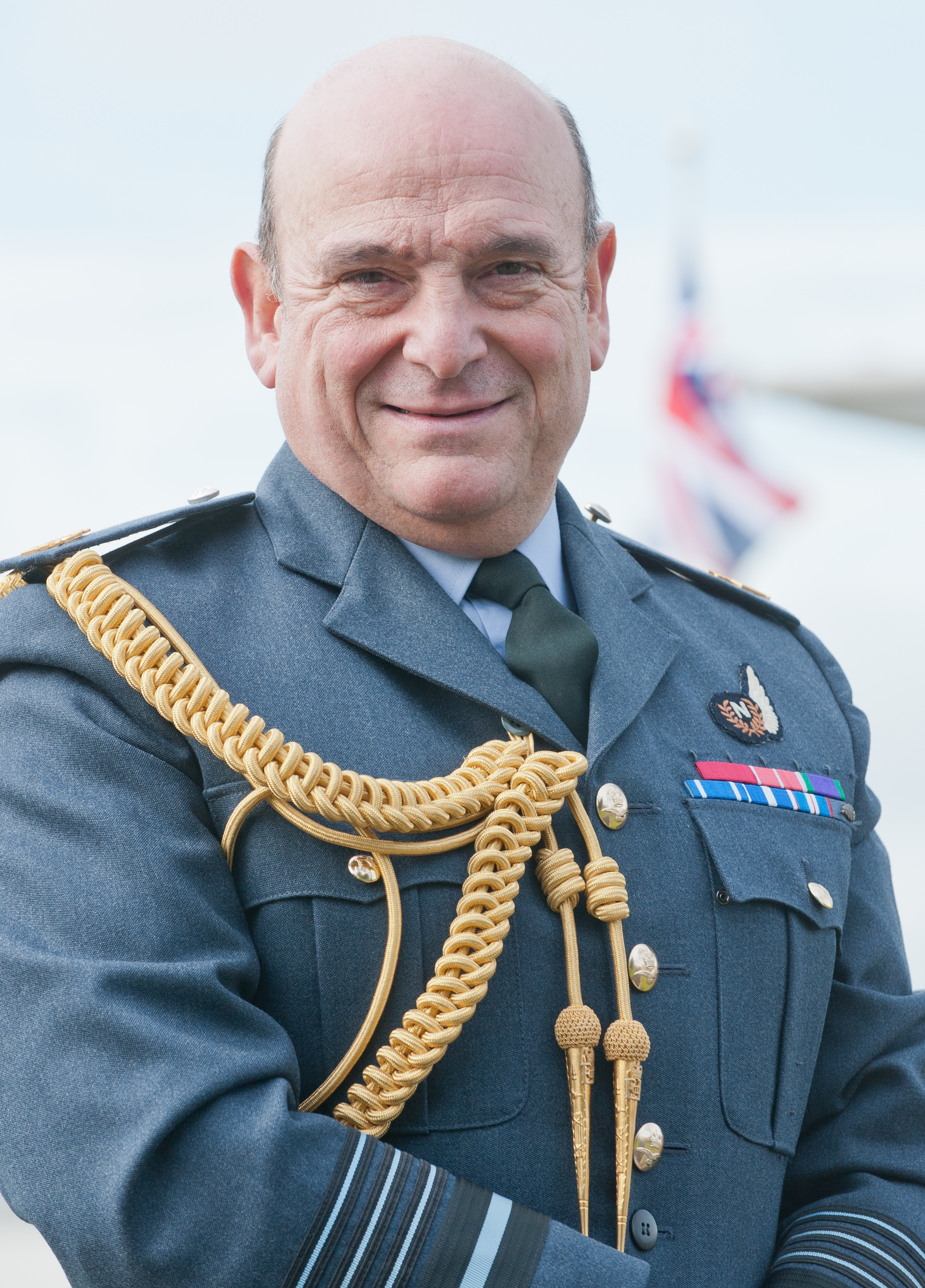
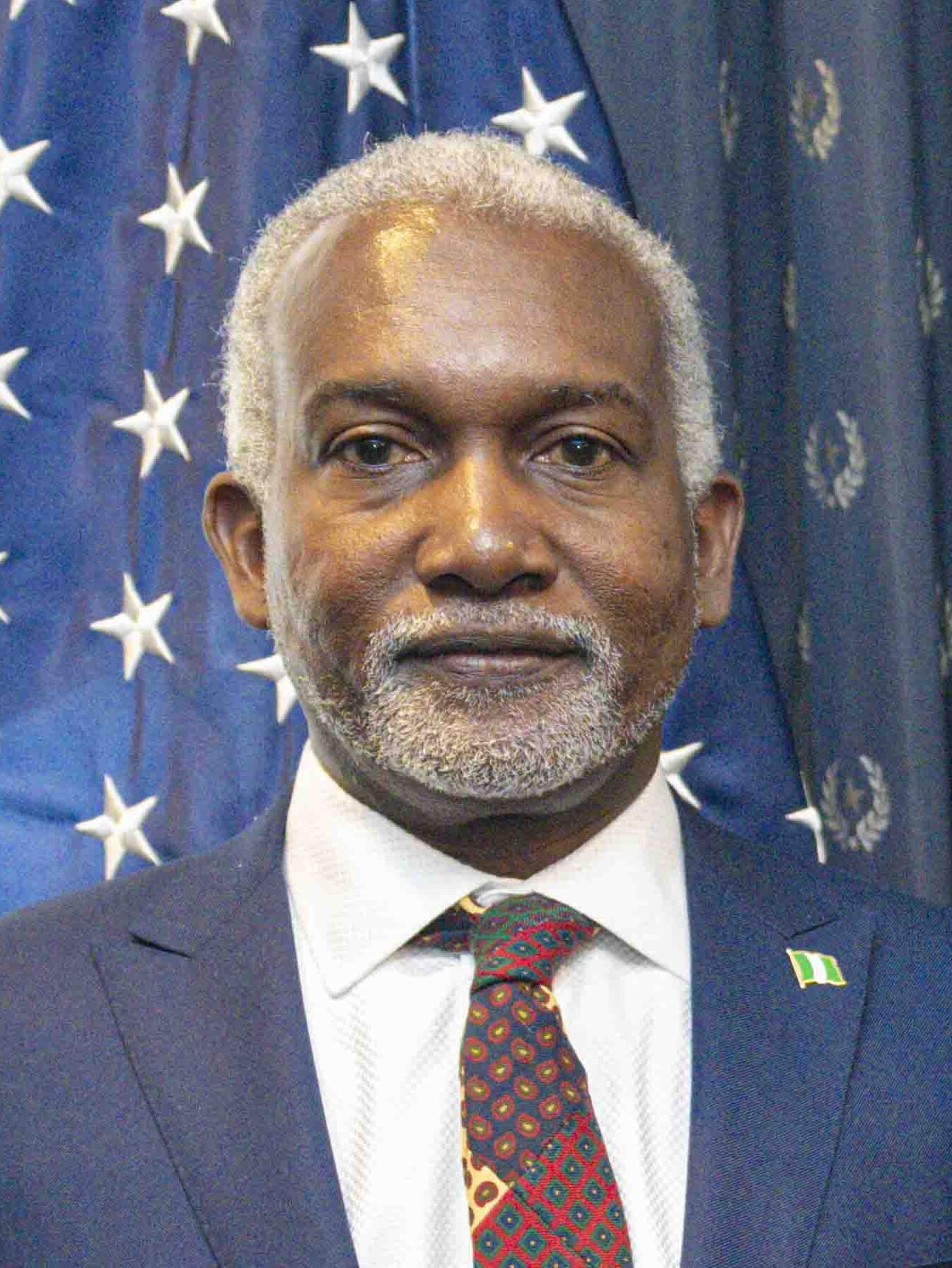
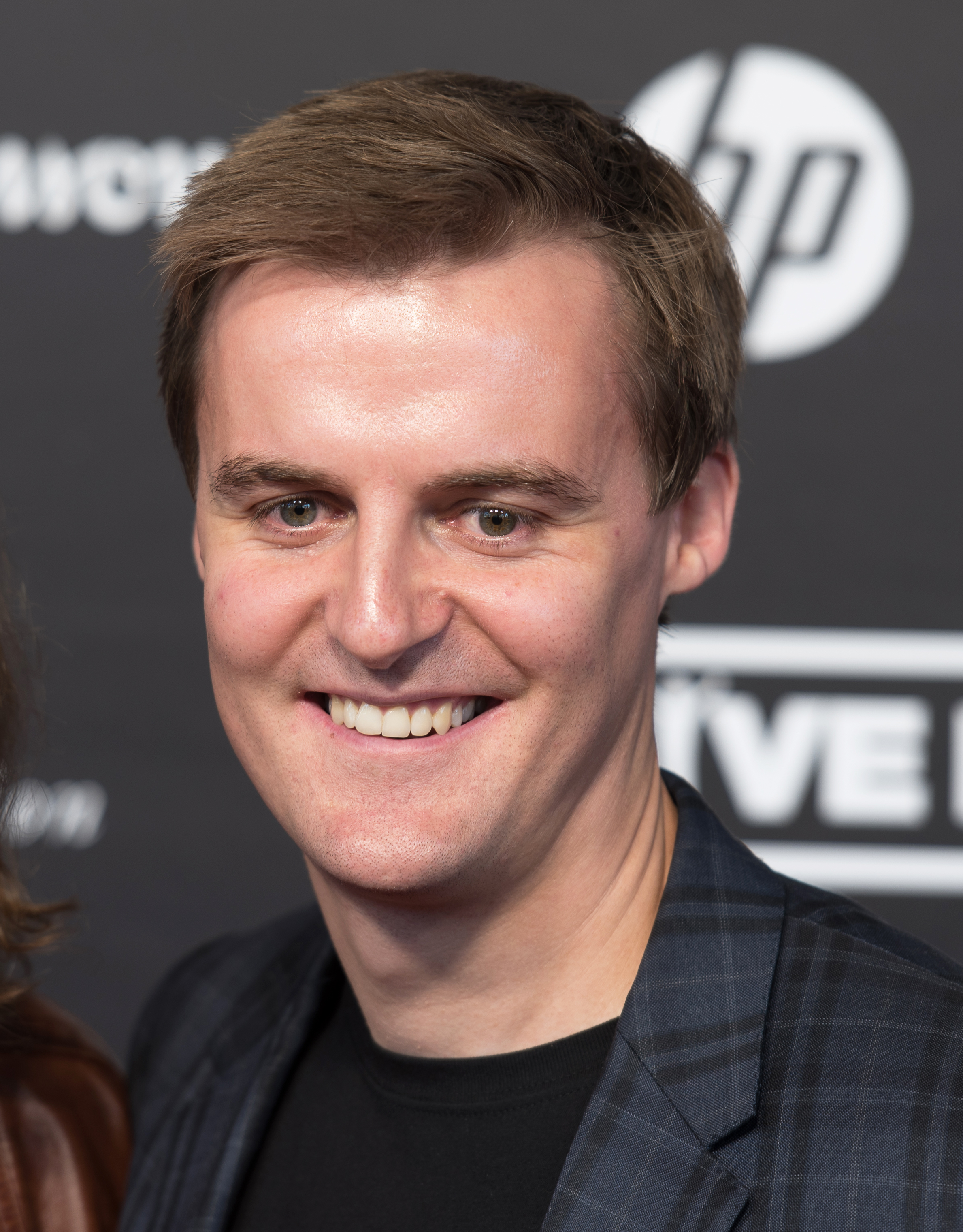
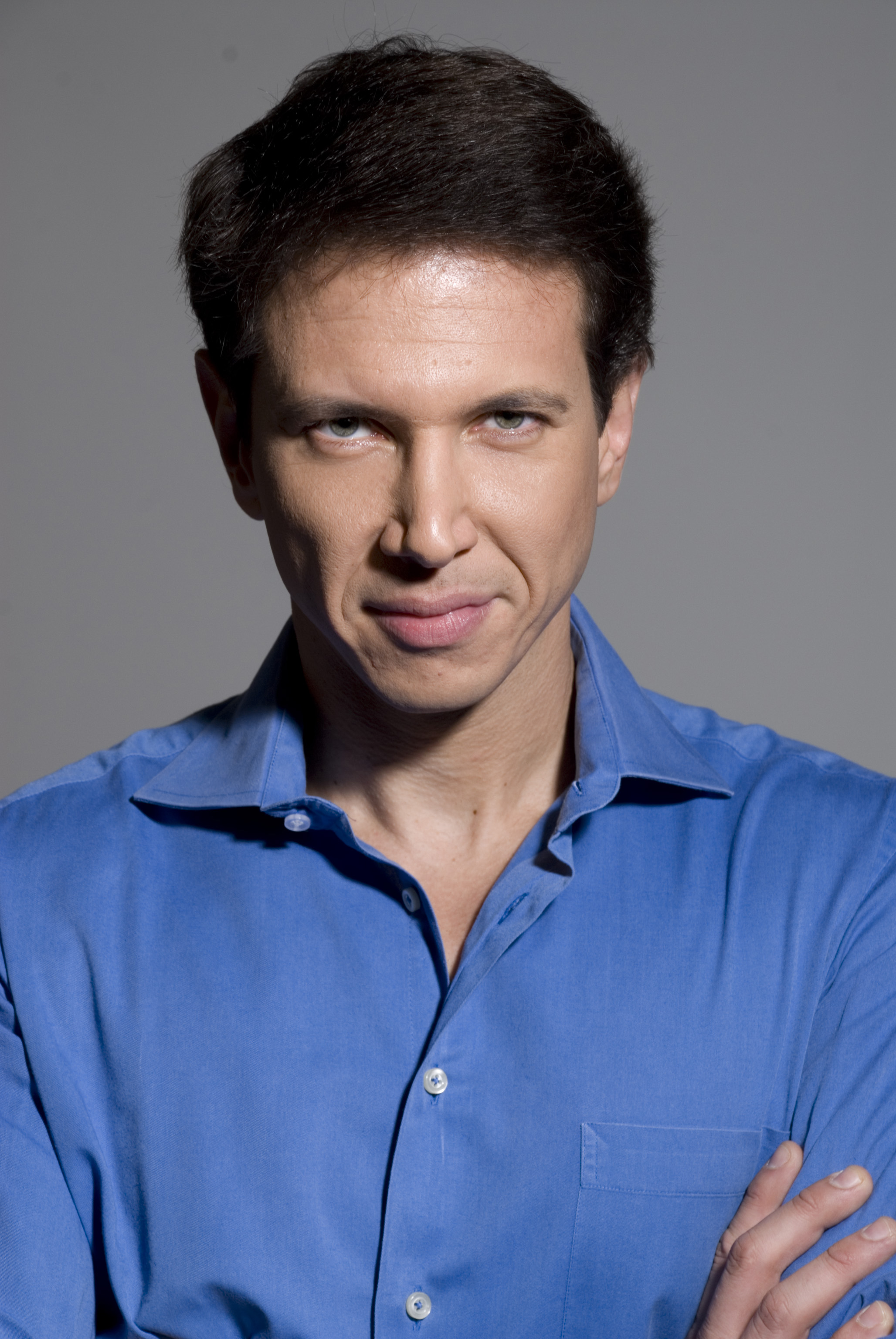
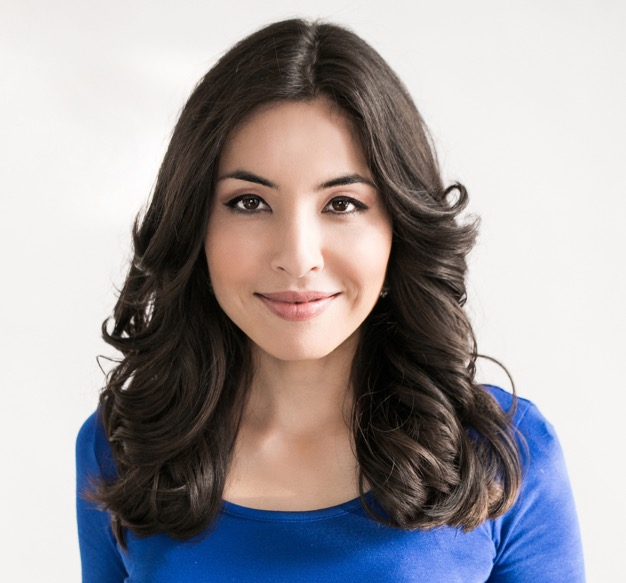
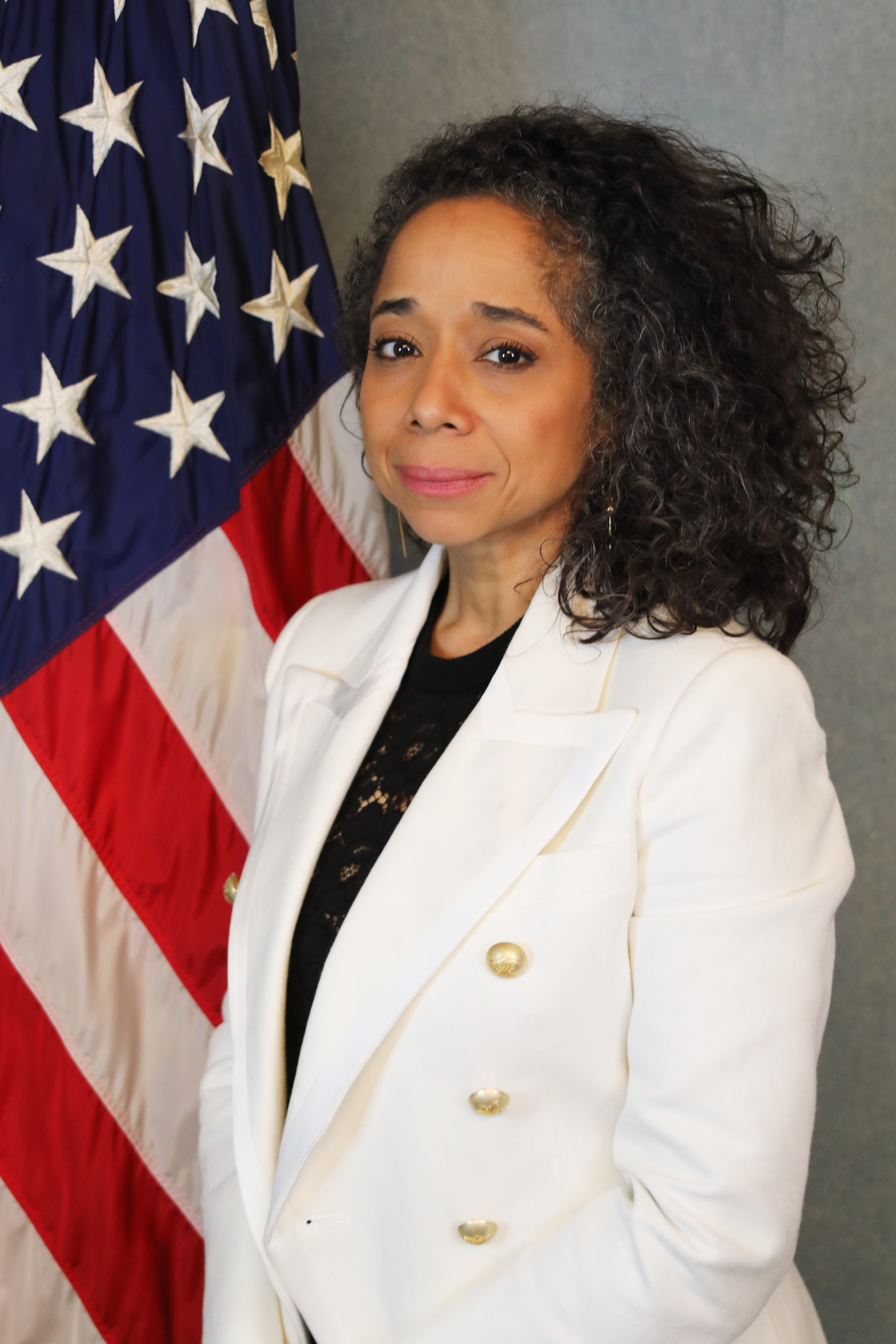
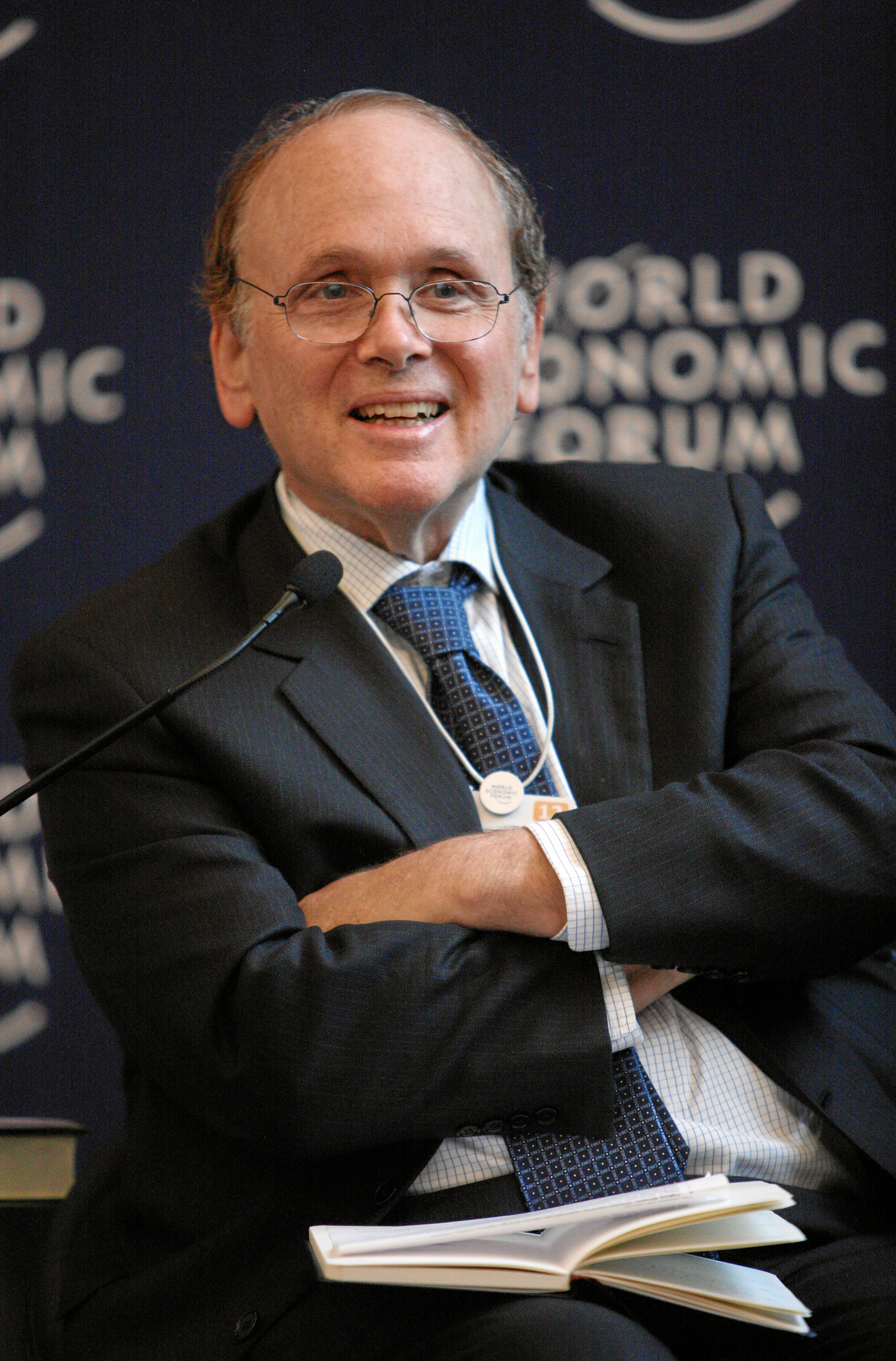
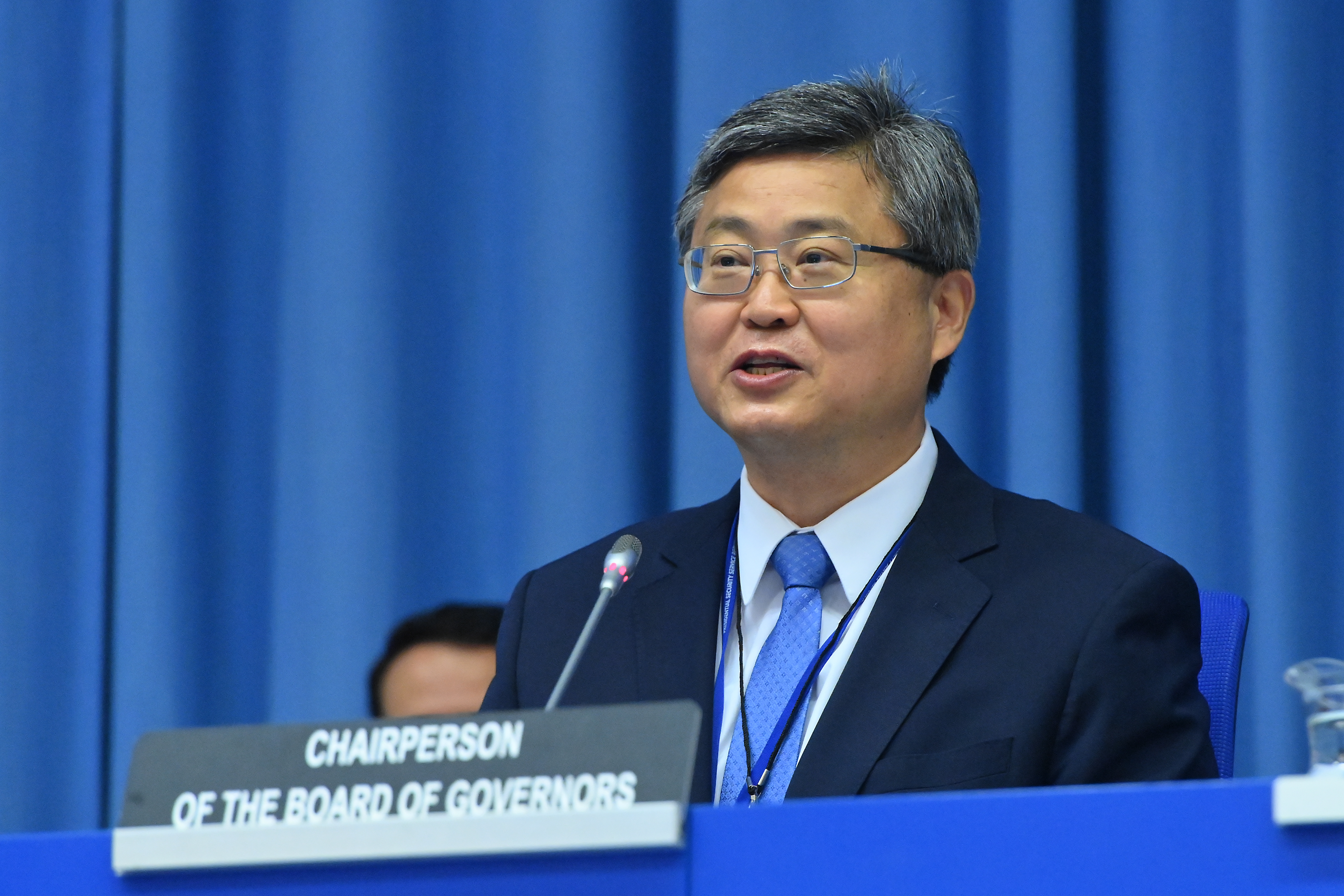
Notable alumnae of Cambridge's politics and international studies programmes include: (top row, left to right) NATO Military Committee chair Sir Stuart Peach, Nigerian foreign minister Yusuf Tuggar, Oaktree founder Hugh Evans; (middle row, left to right) Pulitzer Prize winner Ronen Bergman, CBS News journalist Roxana Saberi, U.S. Ambassador to Spain Julissa Reynoso Pantaleón; (bottom row, left to right) S&P Global vice chair Daniel Yergin, IAEA chair Chae-Hyun Shin.

==== Master of Philosophy (MPhil) programmes ====
- Salman Ahmed — Director of Policy Planning at the U.S. Department of State
- Robyn Curnow — Journalist, CNN
- Hugh Evans — Founder, Oaktree
- Mirza Shakir Ispahani — Managing Director of M. M. Ispahani Limited
- Emily Kassie — Documentary filmmaker, recipient of the 2016 World Press Photo award
- Yuri Kim — United States Ambassador to Albania
- Dan Markel — Professor, Florida State University
- Michael G. Masters — CEO, Secure Community Network
- Evan S. Medeiros — Professor, Georgetown University
- Julissa Reynoso Pantaleón — United States Ambassador to Spain and Andorra
- Stuart Peach — Chair of the NATO Military Committee
- Samir Rifai — Prime Minister of Jordan
- Rohan Sajdeh — Senior Partner, Boston Consulting Group
- Elizabeth N. Saunders — Professor, Columbia University
- Andrew Shearer — Director-General of the Australian Office of National Intelligence
- Damian Williams — United States Attorney for the Southern District of New York

==== Master of Studies (MSt) programme ====
- Massimo Ambrosetti — Ambassador of Italy to the People's Republic of China
- Marcus Bleasdale — Photojournalist, recipient of the 2014 Robert Capa Gold Medal
- Nadine Chahine — Typographer, Fast Company's 2012 "100 Most Creative People in Business"
- Janis Mackey Frayer — Journalist, NBC News
- Vin Gupta — Medical correspondent, NBC News
- Frances-Galatia Lanitou Williams - Cypriot Ambassador to China
- Philip Bob Jusu - Sierra Leone Ambassador to Belgium and the European Union
- Zach Nunn — Member of the U.S. House of Representatives
- Paul Paton — Dean of law, Chapman University
- Roxana Saberi — Journalist, CBS News
- Chae-Hyun Shin — Chair of the International Atomic Energy Agency
- Yusuf Tuggar — Foreign Minister of Nigeria
- Keith Wolahan - Australian Member of Parliament

==== Doctor of Philosophy (PhD) programmes ====
- Peter Biar Ajak — Peace activist
- Ronen Bergman — Journalist and recipient of the Pulitzer Prize
- Reuben Brigety — United States Ambassador to South Africa
- Masuma Hasan — Chair of the Group of 77
- Asle Toje — Deputy Leader of the Norwegian Nobel Committee
- Paul Twomey — CEO of ICANN
- Daniel Yergin — Vice Chair of S&P Global, recipient of the Pulitzer Prize

=== Faculty, past and present ===
- Duncan Bell
- Dame Diane Coyle
- John Dunn
- Andrew Gamble
- Cristina Penasco
- David Walter Runciman, 4th Viscount Runciman of Doxford
- Ayşe Zarakol

== See also ==
- List of schools of international relations
- Rokos School of Government
