= Adam B. Lerner =

American political scientist

Academic background
- Education: University of Cambridge
- Thesis: From the Ashes of History: Post-Traumatic Nationalism and State-Building in India and Israel (2019)
- Doctoral advisor: Shailaja Fennell, Duncan Bell

Academic work
- Institutions: University of Massachusetts Lowell, Royal Holloway, University of London
- Main interests: international political theory, international history, politics of victimhood
- Website: www.adamblerner.com

Adam B. Lerner is an American political scientist who is an associate professor of international relations at the University of Massachusetts Lowell, where he serves as the director of the Bachelor of Liberal Arts (BLA) program. His field of research include the politics of victimhood, the political impact of group minds and collective trauma in international politics, and the intersection of international political theory and international history.

== Education ==
Lerner studied history, political science, international relations, political theory and development studies.

In 2013, he received BA in English with a minor in international relations, at the Cornell University. In 2016, Lerner received his Master of Philosophy at Centre for South Asian Studies, University of Cambridge. In 2020, he earned his PhD at the Department of Politics and International Studies, University of Cambridge.

== Career ==
Lerner is associate professor and senior lecturer in politics and international relations at Royal Holloway, University of London. He serves as the Deputy Director of Royal Holloway's Centre for International Security (RHISC). His main area of research is collective trauma, political culture, political psychology, Indian economic history.

He also served as a public scholar of the American Political Science Association (APSA), a Cambridge Trust Scholar, a Henry Luce Scholar.

== Editorial and journalistic work ==
Lerner co-edited A Trump Doctrine? Unpredictability and Foreign Policy, with Michelle Bentley, published in 2022 by London: Routledge.

He was editor-in-chief of the Cambridge Review of International Affairs. Lerner was a writer and a reporter at Politico and a Henry Luce Scholar at the Caravan, a narrative journalism magazine from Delhi, India. His articles appeared in outlets such as the New York Times, the Pacific Standard, Politico Magazine, The Print, and Himal Southasian, among other.

== Publications ==
He has published books and peer-reviewed articles in his field, including:

=== Reviews ===
- Lerner, A., Book Review: Emotional Choices: How the Logic of Affect Shapes Coercive Diplomacy; 24 Jan 2019, In: Cambridge Review of International Affairs. 32, 1, p. 80-82 3 p.

=== Articles ===
- Lerner, A. B., Pathological Nationalism? The Legacy of Crowd Psychology in International Theory; 9 May 2022, In: International Affairs. 98, 3, p. 995–1012
- Lerner, A. B., Social Science and the Problem of Interpretation: A Pragmatic Dual(ist) Approach; 3 Dec 2020, In: Critical Review.
- Lerner, A., The uses and abuses of victimhood nationalism in international politics; 1 Mar 2020, In: European Journal of International Relations. 26, 1, p. 62-87 26 p.
- Lerner, A., Theorizing Collective Trauma in International Political Economy; 25 May 2018, In: International Studies Review. p. 1-23 23

=== Chapters ===
- Bentley, M. & Lerner, A. B., Introduction: Trump and Unpredictability in International Relations; In: A Trump Doctrine? Unpredictability and Foreign Policy; 10 Nov 2022, London: Routledge

=== Books ===
- Lerner, A. B., From the Ashes of History: Collective Trauma and the Making of International Politics; 29 Mar 2022, Oxford University Press. 297 pages
- Bentley, M. (ed.) & Lerner, A. B. (ed.), A Trump Doctrine? Unpredictability and Foreign Policy; 10 Nov 2022, London: Routledge.
