= St Peter's College, Chelmsford =

Former school in Chelmsford, England

Coordinates: 51.7451°N 0.4537°E

St. Peters College was a Church of England Voluntary Aided School in Chelmsford, Essex. The school was a specialist arts college.

== History ==
The school began as Rainsford Secondary Modern School in 1939, a C of E school.

The school closed in August 2011, with pupils transferring to Chelmer Valley High School.

== Alumni ==
=== Rainsford Secondary Modern School ===
- Geoff Hurst, 1966 World Cup footballer, who played for West Ham
- Mark Dixon (businessman), founder of global serviced office business, Regus
- Michael Brennan, murderer of Paul Simons in May 2013.

== See also ==
- List of secondary schools in Essex
