= Duncan Bell =

Duncan Bell may refer to:

- Duncan Bell (actor) (born 1955), Scottish actor
- Duncan Bell (rugby union) (born 1974), English rugby union player
- Duncan Bell (historian) (born 1976), English lecturer and author
