= Andrew Lo (businessman) =

Hong Kong businessman

Andrew Lo Ching-leung
- Chinese: 羅正亮
- Education: University of Toronto
- Occupations: CEO, Crystal Group
- Father: Kenneth Lo
- Relatives: Law Kar Po (uncle)

Andrew Lo Ching-leung is a Hong Kong businessman, chief executive officer (CEO) of Crystal Group.

== Early life ==
Lo's father is Kenneth Lo, the founder and chairman of Crystal Group, an apparel maker that was established in 1970. Lo's mother is Yvonne Lo, co-founder and vice chairman of Crystal Group.

Lo's uncle is the billionaire Law Kar Po.

== Education ==
Lo earned a bachelor's degree in Art from University of Toronto.

== Career ==
In 1988, Lo joined Crystal Group in the production department of sweaters division. From 2003 to 2007, Lo was the deputy CEO of Crystal Group.

In 2008, Lo became the CEO of Crystal Group.

Lo is a member of the Textile Council of Hong Kong, a trade organization. Lo is an advisor member of court membership at Hong Kong Polytechnic University.
