= Chris Lazari =

Cyprus-born British billionaire property developer

- Born: May 1946; Dora, Cyprus
- Died: 27 July 2015 (aged 69); North London, England
- Occupation: Property developer
- Spouse: Maritsa Lazari
- Children: 3

Christos Lazari (May 1946 – 27 July 2015) was a Cyprus-born British billionaire property developer.

== Early life ==
Chris Lazari was born in Dora, Cyprus, the son of a builder. In 1962, he emigrated to England. At the time, he was 16 years old. The event was prompted by the discovery that his parents were in fact his foster family. According to Lazari, "I was in my third year at the Lanition Gymnasium of Limassol. I boarded the MV Messapia and sailed to England." He left Cyprus with just £20.

== Career ==
With money he saved from washing dishes and working as a waiter, Lazari studied fashion design in London and set up the Drendie Girl clothing label, which successfully sold in London's high-street retailers. In 1978, using the profits from his fashion business, he moved into property. "My father was a builder and I was taught the value of real estate from a very early age."

In 2002, it was reported that Lazari owned commercial and residential property in London's Mayfair and Baker Street, as well as two acres (0.81 ha) along Tottenham Court Road.

His company Lazari Investments owned 2.5 million sq ft (230,000 m^{2}) of London property as of 2015, most of which were offices. Six estates formed 92% of the property portfolio, all in the prime West End of London with a seventh property in north London. The most recent acquisition was the Brunswick Centre, purchased for £135 million in 2014, bringing 45 retail shops, a cinema and 408 flats.

In 2012 Lazari stated, "In my early twenties I began investing in small properties to secure my young family’s financial position with money I earned from my involvement in the fashion business." In May 2014, The Sunday Times estimated his net worth at £1.104 billion.

== Personal life ==
Lazari and his wife Maritsa had three children and lived in Hampstead, London. His wife Maritza is listed as a co-founder of Lazari Investments, and their three children, Len, Nicholas and Andrie are all directors. The two sons have economics degrees, and Andrie has a property law background.

The president of Cyprus, Nicos Anastasiades, is a former schoolmate and a close friend. In 2014, Lazari said that if Anastasiades ever needed to use a private jet, then he would pay for it.

Lazari died on 27 July 2015 at his home in north London of a heart attack.
