= Wescot Credit Services Limited =

United Kingdom receivable management services company

- Company type: Private limited company
- Industry: Debt collection
- Founded: 1983; 42 years ago
- Headquarters: Glasgow, United Kingdom
- Number of locations: 4 (2020)
- Area served: United Kingdom
- Services: Debt collection, receivables management
- Number of employees: 600 (2020)
- Website: www.wescot.co.uk

Wescot Credit Services (known as Wescot) is a British debt collection agency providing receivables management services throughout the United Kingdom. It is authorized and regulated by the Financial Conduct Authority (the “FCA”).

The company operates from offices located in Glasgow, Hull, Saltcoats and Horwich. Wescot provides services across the financial services, telecoms / media, utilities and home retail sectors and is one of the market leaders within the United Kingdom for such services.

== History ==
Wescot was incorporated in Scotland in 1983, but following expansion the business established a second office in Hull in 1989 to support the development of its English based client base. This was followed in 2002 by the establishment of a third contact centre in Saltcoats on the Ayrshire coast, providing additional capacity to support expansion into the provision of outsourced collections services.

In June 2005, the company was acquired by Alchemy Partners Nominees Limited. A new group structure was established headed by Wescot Topco Limited, with debt purchase activity initially moved into a separate legal entity, Wescot SPV Limited, and this business then subsequently disposed of in December 2012. Since that point Wescot has focused solely on its core business of the provision of receivables management services to clients.

In August 2012, Wescot extended its data deal with the information services company Experian. According to the terms of the two-year extension, Experian agreed to provide data to Wescot, enabling it to evaluate debtor characteristics and enhance its overall collections performance.

Wescot employs around 600 individuals across its three offices. The company is led by Paul Jenkins, the Chief Executive Officer, with the board of Executive Directors also comprising Jonathan Graham, Charlotte Allen, and Lynn Cruickshanks.
