= Frances Lanitou =

Cypriot diplomat

Frances-Galatia Lanitou Williams
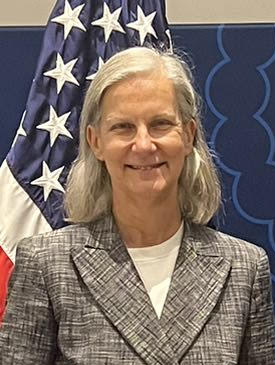
- Lanitou in 2024

Ambassador of the Republic of Cyprus to the People’s Republic of China
- Incumbent
- Assumed office 12 December 2024
- President: Nikos Christodoulides
- Preceded by: Martha Mavrommati

Personal details
- Education: National and Kapodistrian University of Athens; Columbia University; University of Geneva; University of Cambridge; HEC Paris

Frances-Galatia Lanitou Williams (Greek: Φράνσις-Γαλάτεια Λανίτου-Γουίλιαμς) is a Cypriot diplomat. She has served as Ambassador of the Republic of Cyprus to countries including Belgium, Bosnia and Herzegovina, China, Hungary, the Grand Duchy of Luxembourg, Moldova and the Netherlands. She has also served as a Representative of Cyprus to the United Nations General Assembly (UNGA) and as the Ambassador of Development and Cooperation during the Cypriot Presidency of the European Union Council.

== Education ==
Lanitou studied a Bachelors degree in Philology from the National and Kapodistrian University of Athens in Greece; a Masters in English from Columbia University in New York, United States of America; an LLM in International Humanitarian Law from the University of Geneva in Switzerland, a MSt in International Relations from the Department of Politics and International Studies, University of Cambridge in the United Kingdom and an MBA in Innovation and Entrepreneurship from HEC Paris in France.

Lanitou speaks English, French, German and Greek.

== Career ==
Lanitou joined the Ministry of Foreign Affairs of the Republic of Cyprus (MFA) in 1991. She was a member of the Cyprus Delegation to the Conference on Security and Co-operation in Europe (CSCE) Helsinki Follow-Up Meeting and Summit in 1992.

Lanitou served as Representative of Cyprus to the First Committee (Disarmament and International Security) of the United Nations General Assembly (UNGA) from 1993 to 2004. In 2003, she was also Charge affairs of the Permanent Mission in Geneva, Switzerland.

Lanitou served as Ambassador of the Republic of Cyprus to Hungary with parallel accreditations to Bosnia and Herzegovina and Moldova from 2006 to 2010.

Lanitou served as the Ambassador of Development and Cooperation during the Cypriot Presidency of the European Union Council from 2010 to 2013. She served as Ambassador of the MFA Economic Diplomacy Project for Strategy Development and Capability Building from 2016 to 2020.

Lanitou served as Ambassador of the Republic of Cyprus to the Netherlands with parallel accreditations to Belgium and the Grand Duchy of Luxembourg from 2020 to 2024. As Ambassador, she met with religious leaders including the Metropolitan Athenagoras of Belgium, Yves Peckstadt, and received a delegation from Gender Concerns International to the Cypriot Embassy in The Hauge. In 2021, she represented the Government of Cyprus for their €20,000 donation to a special Organisation for the Prohibition of Chemical Weapons (OPCW) Trust Fund. In 2022, an 8th-century BC Cypriot jug that was likely smuggled out of the country during the 1974 Turkish invasion of Cyprus was found on sale and is now on a long-term loan to the Rijksmuseum van Oudheden in Leiden. In 2023, she was invited to attend the Annual High Tea Honouring Women of Influence at the Des Indes Hotel in The Hague.

As of 2025, Lanitou serves as Ambassador of the Republic of Cyprus to the People’s Republic of China, presenting her credentials to President Xi Jinping on 12 December 2024, and meeting with Assistant Minister of the International Department of the Chinese Communist Party's (CPC) Central Committee, Ma Hui, shortly after her appointment. As Ambassador, she visited the Chinese Center for Globalization (CCG) and the China Classification Society (CSS), as well as attending events for the 2025 Intangible Cultural Heritage (ICH) Week. She has met with politicians of the Central Committee of the Chinese Communist Party and has participated in diplomacy on maritime cooperation.

Lanitou has supported the International Gender Champions pledges against gender-based violence and for gender parity.
