= Ayşe Zarakol =

Turkish political scientist (born 1977)

- Born: Ankara, Turkey
- Occupations: Academic, scholar, author
- Website: aysezarakol.com

Ayşe Zarakol (born 1977) is a Turkish academic, scholar and author. She holds the position of professor of international relations at the University of Cambridge's Department of Politics and International Studies and is a politics researcher at Emmanuel College, where she teaches international politics.

== Life ==
Zarakol grew up in Istanbul, Turkey. She earned her bachelor's degree in Political Science and Classical Studies from Middlebury College in Vermont, USA. Zarakol continued her academic pursuits at the University of Wisconsin-Madison, where she obtained both an MA and a PhD in political science. Following her graduation, she held a tenure-track assistant professor position in Politics at Washington & Lee University in Virginia. Zarakol became a member of both the University of Cambridge and its affiliated Emmanuel College in 2013.

== Works ==
Zarakol's research focuses on East–West relations within the international system, the challenges of modernity and sovereignty, the dynamics of rising and declining powers, and the theoretical foundations of international relations.

Her debut book, After Defeat: How the East Learned to Live with the West, published in 2011, delves into the process of incorporating internationally defeated and non-Western powers into the global order. The book was published in Turkish in 2012 as Yenilgiden Sonra: Doğu Batı ile Yaşamayı Nasıl Öğrendi by Koç University Press.

Her second book, Before the West: The Rise and Fall of Eastern World Orders advances, examines Eastern world orders that existed between the 13th and 17th centuries, orders that, in certain respects, can be compared to the contemporary international order. The book was the recipient of six book prizes.

Because the book provides a grand historical narrative of Eurasia that focuses on empires, I had some worries that some people think I am a Eurasianist or an apologist for empire.

Her scholarly articles have been published in journals, including the American Political Science Review, Annual Review of Political Science, International Organization, International Affairs, International Theory, International Studies Quarterly, European Journal of International Relations, Review of International Studies, and Cooperation & Conflict, among others.

Zarakol was awarded the 2023 Rahmi M. Koç Medal of Science, an annual prize recognizing contributions to a scholar's field by an individual of Turkish descent. In 2024, Zarakol was elected as a fellow of both the British Academy and Academia Europaea. She also delivered the ST Lee Distinguished Lecture at the Lee Kuan Yew School of Public Policy in 2025.
