= Park Hotel Group =

Asian hotel group

- Company type: Private
- Industry: Hospitality, Tourism
- Founder: Allen Law
- Headquarters: Singapore
- Number of locations: Singapore, Malaysia, Australia, Hong Kong, China, Japan, Maldives
- Area served: Asia-Pacific
- Key people: Law Kar Por (Chairman), Allen Law (Founder & CEO)
- Brands: Grand Park, Park Hotel, Destination
- Website: https://www.parkhotelgroup.com

Park Hotel Group is a hospitality company headquartered in Singapore, operating approximately 30 hotels and resorts across 11 destinations in the Asia-Pacific region.

== History ==
Park Hotel Group was founded by investor and entrepreneur Allen Law. The chairman of Park Hotel Group is Hong Kong billionaire Law Kar Por.

Park Hotel Group’s business interests include the development, ownership and management of hospitality and lifestyle brands and assets, as well as the continuous upskilling and development of the talent pool for the hospitality and service sector in the region.

The group received six consecutive "Best Regional Hotel Chain" awards from the TTG Travel Awards.
