= Allen Law =

Hong Kong-born business magnate

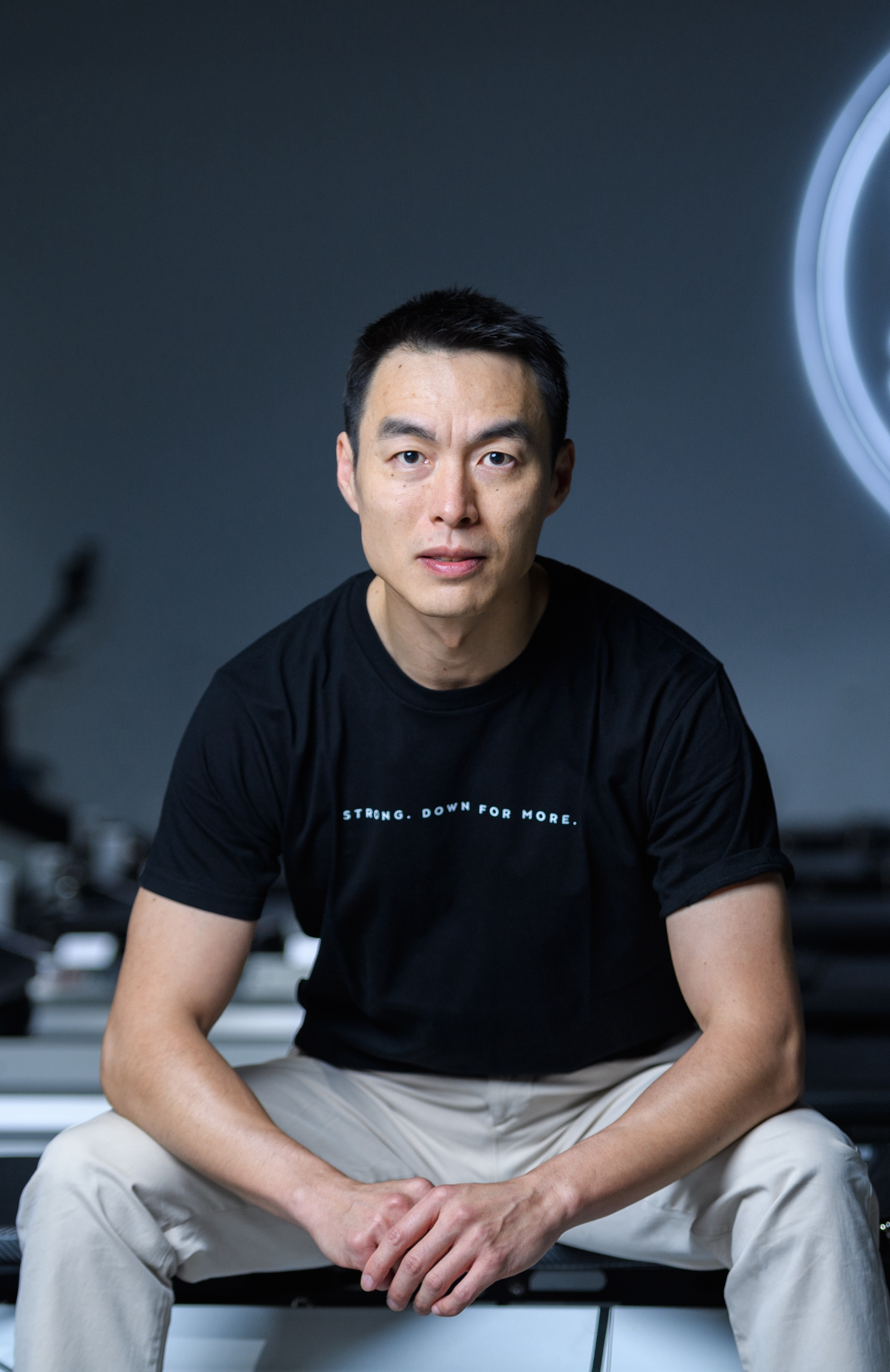
- Born: 1980 (age 45–46); British Hong Kong
- Education: King's College London
- Occupations: Founder and Entrepreneur
- Known for: Founder of Park Hotel Group, Co-founder of MOVE [REPEAT], Chair of REVL Training, Entrepreneur, Principal of Seveno Capital, Founder & CEO of MORROW
- Spouse: Tan Shin Hui
- Father: Law Kar Po

Allen Law (Chinese: 羅正雄; born 1980) is a Hong Kong-born and Singapore-based businessman and entrepreneur. He is the founder of Park Hotel Group, co-founder of MOVE [REPEAT], chairman of REVL Training, Principal of Seveno Capital and founder and CEO of MORROW.

== Background and family ==
Law is a third-generation entrepreneur from the Law family, known for its business ventures in garments, fashion, and real estate. His grandfather, Law Ting Pong, founded LAWSGROUP, the world's leading apparel manufacturer, his father, Law Kar Po, is a Hong Kong-based businessman with investments in real estate and hospitality. Law has led and expanded the family's business presence, particularly in the hotel industry, while establishing ventures in the fitness and wellness sector.

== Career ==
Law completed his bachelor's degree in mathematics and management at King's College London. In 2003, he returned to Hong Kong and founded Park Hotel Group. Initially, he worked across multiple roles within the business, including entry-level service positions, before moving into executive leadership.

=== Park Hotel Group ===
Under Law leadership, Park Hotel Group expanded from a single property in Hong Kong into a regional hospitality portfolio. Notable milestones include the purchase and sale of Grand Park Orchard. Purchased in 2005 as the Crown Prince Hotel, for SG$300 million (US$238m), and following a $80 million renovation, the hotel re-opened in 2010, before being sold for SG$ 1.15 billion in 2013. Allen also oversaw further expansion into China, the Maldives, and Japan.

=== MOVE [REPEAT] ===
In 2023, Law co-founded MOVE [REPEAT], a collective of boutique fitness and lifestyle brands. The company owns over 50 studios across five countries. MOVE [REPEAT] includes Yoga Movement, one of the largest yoga chains in Singapore and the Singapore franchise for STRONG Pilates.

MOVE [REPEAT] led the entry of Australian brand STRONG Pilates into the Singaporean market with four locations launched in its first year, and acquired Yoga Movement's 10-location business in 2023.

In 2025, Allen invested in Australian global fitness brand REVL Training through MOVE[REPEAT].

=== REVL Training ===
In January 2025, Allen Law invested in REVL Training. REVL Training focuses on performance-based workouts with a strong sense of community. Since it launched, the company has grown quickly—by 240% each year—and now has 35 locations across Australia, Dubai, Singapore, and South Korea.

In March 2025, Law was appointed Chairman of REVL Training to support its expansion into new markets, including the USA, New Zealand, Southeast Asia, the Middle East, North Africa, and the United Kingdom.

Also, Law served as a board member of SkillsFuture SG from 2017 to 2022 and was a board member of the Singapore Tourism Board from 2017 to 2021.

=== Seveno Capital ===
In April 2025, Law launched Seveno Capital, a Singapore-based venture capital firm focused on early- and growth-stage companies in healthspan, wellness and longevity. The firm said it would draw on a US$70 million five-year investment commitment from Law and announced Japan-based A Cabin Company as its first investment.

Seveno Capital later announced investments and ventures including The Well Estate, a medical-wellness real estate joint venture with Borderless Healthcare Group, and PointFit, a Hong Kong wearable-technology company.

=== MORROW ===
In 2025, Law founded MORROW, a Singapore-based longevity and preventive-health venture. The company announced plans to invest US$156 million, equivalent to about S$200 million, over five years to open MORROW locations, beginning with a 38,000 sq ft flagship clinic in Singapore.

Law has described MORROW’s mission as helping reduce the gap between lifespan and healthspan, positioning the company as a scalable preventive-health platform designed around diagnostics, behaviour change, continuous engagement, and proactive healthcare.

== Longevity Century ==
In 2026, Law published a mission statement and manifesto outlining what he called the "Longevity Century" - a vision centred on extending healthspan, expanding access to preventive healthcare, and building the infrastructure, platforms, and investment ecosystem required to support healthier ageing at population scale.

The manifesto argued that longevity should evolve beyond specialist medicine and become an increasingly integrated part of mainstream healthcare and everyday life. It also set out a broader ambition to support the development of preventive-health systems capable of helping people live longer, healthier lives through a combination of healthcare, technology, behavioural science, and long-term investment.

== Personal life ==
Law is a permanent resident in Singapore. In 2010, Law married Tan Shin Hui, granddaughter of Singaporean businessman Wee Cho Yaw.

Law is a competitive track athlete, gymnast, and yoga practitioner. An advocate for holistic wellness, he promotes fitness and longevity through lifestyle changes focused on health and well-being.
