= Maritsa Lazari =

Cyprus-born British billionaire businesswoman (b. 1943)

- Born: October 1943 (age 82); Dora, Cyprus
- Occupation: Businesswoman
- Spouse: Chris Lazari (m. 1965; died 2015)
- Children: 3

Maritsa Lazari (born October 1943) is a Cyprus-born British billionaire businesswoman. She was married to the Cyprus-born British billionaire property developer Chris Lazari until his death in 2015. As of May 2022, her net worth was estimated at US$2.7 billion.

== Early life ==
Maritsa Lazari was born in October 1943 in Cyprus. She emigrated with her family to London at the age of 16.

Lazari met her future husband and fellow Cypriot Chris Lazari in the UK and the couple married in 1965.

== Career ==
Chris Lazari created a successful fashion line, Drendie Girl, and in 1978 the couple used profits from the company to invest in commercial property.

Maritsa was a director of the property investment business, Lazari Investments, from its founding. She is listed as a founder of a business.

Lazari Investments owns a number of commercial and residential developments in London, including the Brunswick Centre.

== Personal life ==
Maritsa lives in London, UK, and has three children. The family founded the Christo Lazari Foundation in 2017, which supports Cypriot, Greek Orthodox and medical causes. The Foundation donated £3.25m of investment property to the children's charity Radiomarathan.
