= Martin Bolland =

British businessman, former chairman of Capital (born 1956)

- Born: Martin Keith Bolland; August 1956 (age 69–70)
- Education: Cambridge University
- Known for: co-founder, Alchemy Partners
- Board member of: Capita; Alchemy Partners

Martin Keith Bolland (born August 1956) is a British businessman, former chairman of Capita, and a co-founder and former partner of Alchemy Partners.

== Early life ==
Martin Keith Bolland was born in August 1956. He has a bachelor's degree in Economics from Cambridge University. He is a chartered accountant.

== Career ==
He was the chairman of Capita from January 2010 to December 2016, and chairman of many other private equity backed businesses. He was a co-founder and former partner of Alchemy Partners.
