= Mark Dixon (businessman) =

Monaco-English businessman (born 1959)

- Born: Mark Leslie James Dixon; 2 November 1959 (age 66); Essex, England
- Education: Rainsford High School
- Occupation: Businessman
- Known for: Founder, Regus
- Spouse: Trudi Groves (m. 1988; div. 2005)
- Children: 5

Mark Leslie James Dixon (born 2 November 1959) is a Monaco-based English billionaire businessman, best known as the founder of serviced office business Regus, renamed International Workplace group (IWG plc) in 2016.

== Early life ==
Dixon was born on 2 November 1959. The son of a car mechanic, he was educated at Rainsford High School, Essex, England. On noticing that a new housing estate needed nourishment for its gardens, he sold peat distributed by wheelbarrow.

== Career ==
After leaving school at 16, Dixon founded a sandwich making business, Dial-a-Snack, which delivered locally on a butcher's bicycle. After the business failed, he travelled the world, becoming a barman in St Tropez, a miner in Australia, a farmhand in Asia; and selling encyclopedias.

Returning to Essex, he invested £600 in a burger van, based on London's North Circular road. From profits he then bought seven other vans, but found difficulty in obtaining good and regular bun supply. He set up The Bread Roll Company to supply his own and other mobile fast food vendors, which he sold in 1988 for £800,000.

Relocating to Brussels, Belgium, he set up an apartment rental business. While sitting in a café, he regularly noticed how local business people were conducting meetings around the small tables of local coffee shops. He started Regus, an office space business, in 1989. By mid-2001 the business was worth £2 billion, with Dixon's 60 percent stake making him a billionaire. However, after the failure of the dot.com boom, Dixon's stake fell and he was valued at less than £80m.

In 2002, 58% of the UK arm of the business was sold to UK private equity firm Alchemy Partners. Regus bought the stake back three years later. Dixon has since rebuilt the business and expanded internationally. The company now has a presence in over 100 countries. Dixon remains the company's chief executive.

Dixon owns the Chateau de Berne vineyard in Provence which includes a five-star hotel and restaurant. The vineyard produces around 5 million bottles of wine a year, making it the second-largest producer in Provence. In 2017, Dixon bought the 150-acre Kingscote Estate in East Grinstead, West Sussex to expand production to the United Kingdom.

According to The Sunday Times Rich List in 2021, his net worth was estimated at £1.437 billion.

== Personal life ==
Dixon married journalist Trudy Groves in 1988; they divorced in 2005, with a £28.7m settlement.

Dixon is a resident of Monaco for tax reasons. He voluntarily pays tax in the United Kingdom.
