= Quality Save =

Discount store chain in northern England

- Type: Private
- Industry: Discount Retail Stores
- Founded: 1974; 52 years ago
- Founder: Bob Rudkin
- Defunct: 2024; 2 years ago
- Fate: Acquired by TJ Morris and rebranded to Home Bargains
- Headquarters: Swinton, England
- Owner: Quality Save Ltd (1974–2023); TJ Morris (2023–2024)
- Website: qualitysave.co.uk

Quality Save was a chain of discount stores operated in northern England. The head office/store for Quality Save was located in Swinton.

== History ==
Quality Save was founded in 1974 by Bob Rudkin. He started off with an indoor market stall in Walkden, and a small shop in Farnworth.

In 2010, stores began playing a clip every fifteen minutes reminding customers of their "Star Buy" deals, their cheap prices in comparison to pound stores, and the company's alcohol policy. These clips end with the company's name and their slogan: "Quality Save. Quality Brands – Quality Prices". In 2012, Quality Save closed an outlet in Barnsley to open a much bigger one a few feet down the road. They also closed a temporary unit in Urmston, and opened a new one in the Eden Square Shopping Centre.

In 2015, the Middleton branch of Quality Save was closed, and a superstore was launched in the ex Tesco unit next door. It was then confirmed that their biggest ever superstore would open in the beginning of 2017 in Walkden, the town where the company was first founded on a market stall. In February 2017, the biggest ever Quality Save store was opened in Walkden Town Retail Park. This store was 22,000 cubic feet.

On 26 January 2023, Quality Save was sold to TJ Morris, owner of Home Bargains, with all stores to rebrand to the Home Bargains brand. Later in August 2023, TJ Morris would contact the stores of Stalybridge, Atherton, Chorley and Darwen, notifying them that their store would close down for good. These closures were completed by October 2023. The Chorlton and Dewsbury stores were also later closed down due to redevelopment and building issues respectively. Quality Save's final store, Widnes, was closed for rebrand to Home Bargains on 1 April 2024.

== Stores ==
Quality Save stores could usually be found in major shopping streets and shopping centres. Stores range from small to large outlets. Quality Save's largest store was located in Walkden, followed by the store located in the Stretford Mall. They acquired some of the former outlets of Woolworths. Although the official slogan for the company was "Quality Brands – Quality Prices", the Quality Save stores carrying old signs displayed the Home Bargains slogan: "Top Brands – Bottom Prices".

== Home Bargains ==
They were supplied by TJ Morris Ltd. Because of this, Quality Save was often confused with Home Bargains. Stores had a red and sky blue logo similar to that of Home Bargains, which was later changed to avoid confusion between the two companies. Many Quality Save stores, however, retained the old logo up until the rebranding of the business to Home Bargains.
