= Chae-Hyun Shin =

Korean diplomat

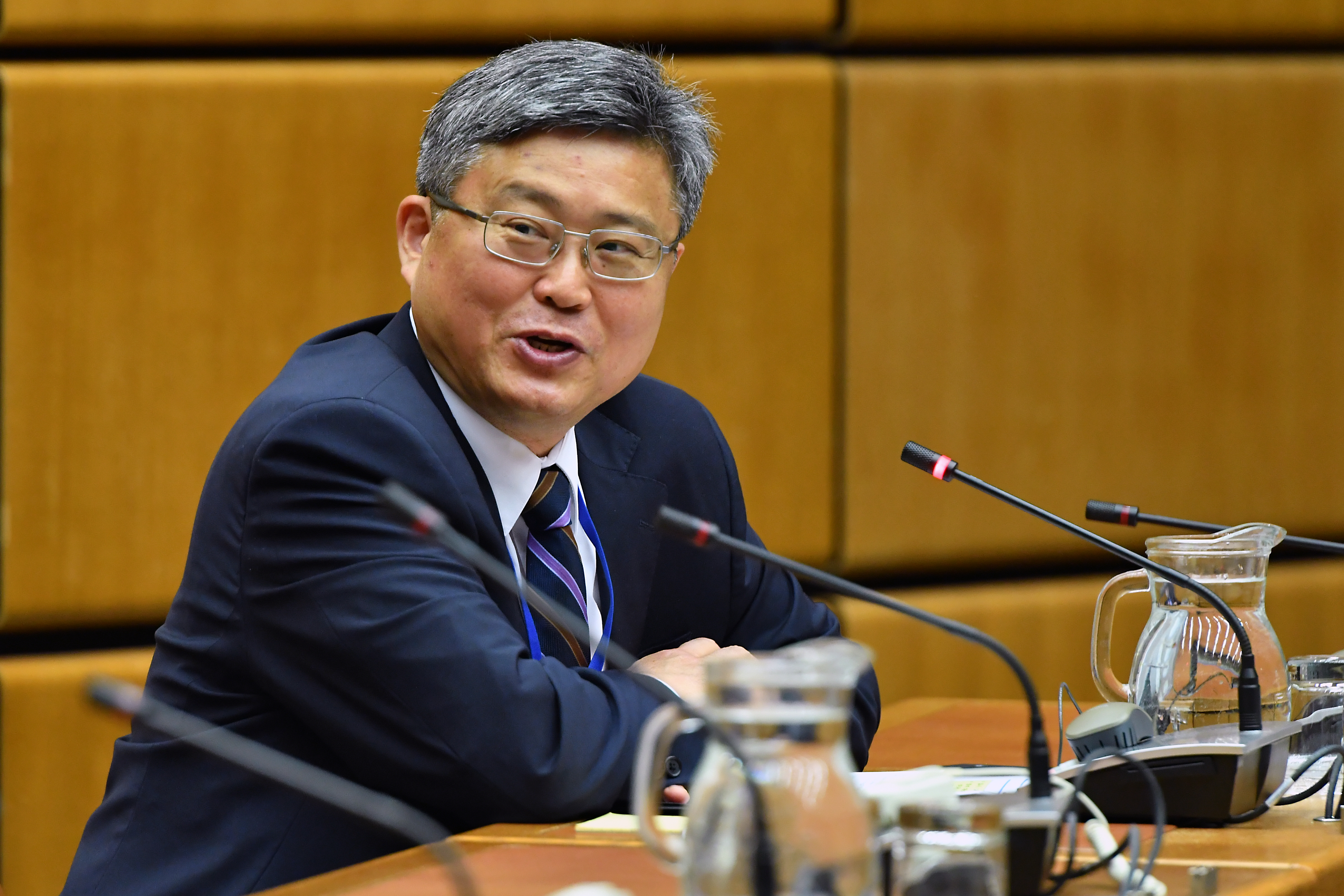
Chae-Hyun Shin pictured in 2022

Chae-Hyun Shin (Korean: 신채현) is a South Korean diplomat who served as the ambassador of South Korea to Austria and, from 2021 to 2022, as chair of the board of governors of the International Atomic Energy Agency.

Shin has also served as director-general for North Korean Nuclear Affairs in the Office of Korean Peninsula Peace and Security Affairs, as presidential secretary for foreign policy at the ROK's national security office, and as Korean consul general posted to the United States. As of 2023, he is head of international relations for the city of Busan.

Shin majored in communication at Seoul National University and received a master's degree in international relations from the University of Cambridge.
