= Crystal Group =

Clothing manufacturer

- Founded: 1970
- Founder: Kenneth Lo and Yvonne Lo
- Headquarters: Hong Kong
- Key people: Kenneth Lo, chairman Andrew Lo, CEO
- Revenue: over US$1.6 billion
- Number of employees: 48,000
- Website: www.crystalgroup.com

Crystal International Group Limited (Chinese: 晶苑國際集團) is a Hong-Kong-headquartered clothing manufacturer, employing over 48,000 people in Asia.

Crystal Group was established in 1970 by Kenneth Lo and his wife Yvonne (羅蔡玉清). It employs over 48,000 people in 20 locations and has an annual turnover of over US$1.6 billion.

The chairman is the founder Kenneth Lo. The CEO is his son Andrew Lo.
