= Tom Morris (businessman) =

British businessman (born 1954)

- Born: 10 February 1954 (age 72); Liverpool, England
- Occupation: Businessman
- Known for: Founder and 89% owner of Home Bargains
- Spouse: Kristina O'Hare
- Children: 5

Thomas Joseph Morris (born 10 February 1954) is a British billionaire businessman and the founder of retail chain Home Bargains.

According to the Forbes in December 2024, Morris is worth $5 billion.

== Early life ==
Thomas Joseph Morris was born on 10 February 1954 in Liverpool. He is the son of a shopkeeper in Liverpool's Scotland Road, and one of seven children of Tom and Veronica Morris. The Morris family have been involved in retailing for three generations.

He received a degree in engineering.

== Career ==
Morris started the Liverpool-based discount retail chain Home Bargains in 1976 in Old Swan, when he was 21 years old. The chain, during the time originally named "Home and Bargain" retails a diverse range of goods, including health and beauty products, groceries and toys. The stock is often bought at discount from brands trying to offload stock.

In 1995, Morris decided to rebrand the stores logo and name, from "Home and Bargain" to Home Bargains, with a new blue and red corporate logo which was designed by Morris's family member and graphic designer Anton Morris.

Morris reportedly founded the brand using a bank overdraft. It now has more than 595 stores, employing more than 34,000 staff. It still has its largest presence in the Merseyside region of the UK, and is the largest single employer in the area. Morris has said that he plans to expand the chain to more than 800 stores. Morris's interest in Home Bargain's is held by parent company TJ Morris.

Morris owns 89% while his younger brother, Joe Morris, is a smaller shareholder and operations director. Three other brothers also work for the company.

Morris was worth an estimated £2.05 billion in 2014, as per the Sunday Times Rich List. In April 2018, Forbes estimated his net worth at $3.1 billion.

In 2023, the Sunday Times Rich List estimated Morris' net worth as £6.133 billion, making him the richest Liverpudlian and fourth wealthiest person from North-West England.

In 2018, Morris paid himself £1 million.

== Personal life ==
He is married and lives in Liverpool, England.

In 2001, the Liverpool Echo reported that his son worked for the company, and that his daughter Lisa and her American husband Brian run Morris Textiles, the linen warehouse.

In February 2026, Tom was listed on the Sunday Times Tax list with an estimated £209.1 million.
