= Chris Rokos =

British hedge fund manager (born 1970)

- Born: Christopher Charles Rokos; 21 September 1970 (age 56); London, United Kingdom
- Education: Eton College, Pembroke College, Oxford University
- Occupation: Hedge fund CEO
- Known for: Rokos Capital Management, Brevan Howard

Christopher Charles Rokos (born 21 September 1970) is a British billionaire hedge fund manager. He is the founder of macro hedge fund Rokos Capital Management and a former founding partner of Brevan Howard Asset Management.

According to The Sunday Times Rich List in 2020, Rokos' net worth was estimated at £800 million. In 2026, Forbes estimated his wealth at £2.3 billion.

== Early life ==
Born in London, England, Rokos is of Greek descent. He received a scholarship to attend Eton College. Following the completion of his secondary education, Rokos studied mathematics at Pembroke College, Oxford University, graduating in 1992 with a first class honours degree. He is a Foundation Fellow of Pembroke College.

== Career ==
=== Early career ===
After leaving university, Rokos joined UBS in London before moving to Goldman Sachs in October 1993 where he worked for three years. In January 1998, Rokos was recruited by Alan Howard to join Credit Suisse as a proprietary trader.

=== Brevan Howard ===
In early 2002, Alan Howard and Rokos both resigned, together with three other directors at Credit Suisse – Jean Philippe Blochet, James Vernon and Trifon Natsis. Together, they founded an asset management business which they named Brevan Howard.

=== Rokos Capital Management ===
In 2012, Rokos retired from Brevan Howard, setting up a family office in London's Mayfair to manage his own wealth. In the summer of 2014, Rokos filed a suit in the Royal Court of Jersey against Brevan Howard contesting the five-year noncompete restrictions which would have prevented him from managing outside capital until at least 2018.

The case was settled out of court in January 2015, clearing the way for Rokos to start his own firm. As part of the settlement, Brevan Howard took an unspecified financial stake in the new business, as well as supporting its setup.

Rokos Capital Management began trading in the autumn of 2015, gaining approximately 20 per cent in its first calendar year (2016). According to the Financial Times, Rokos Capital Management was helped by bets on market moves around Donald Trump's election victory.

Rokos was one of a number of hedge fund managers who predicted the UK Referendum vote on EU membership incorrectly; the New York Times wrote that he had told associates that he expected the "remain" vote to win. Despite this, Rokos Capital Management gained more than 2.5 percent in a single day immediately after the vote.

In 2017–2018, Rokos Capital Management's profits fell by 85% to £22.9 million. In January 2019, Rokos sought to raise up to $900 million from investors.

In 2025 Greek Reporter listed Rokos as one of the top 5 wealthiest Greeks and Greek Cypriots of the UK.

In February 2026, Chris Rokos was listed on the Sunday Times Tax list with an estimated £330 million paid in income tax.

In September 2026, it was announced Rokos would be moving his residency away from the UK to Greece.

== Political donations ==
Rokos was one of a number of hedge fund managers who made donations to Britain's Conservative Party under David Cameron in the run-up to the 2015 general election, contributing £1.9 million in total. His last donation was made in 2018, during Theresa May's second ministry.

== Philanthropy ==
Rokos has given to Amnesty International and Water Aid, the Royal United Services Institute, Chatham House and Policy Exchange.

Rokos has supported the New Foundation Scholarships programme at Eton College since 2010. In 2025, a yard was named after him at the school.

In addition, he has made financial contributions to Pembroke College, Oxford, including funding research scholarships and helping to redevelop the college's buildings. In 2023, a quad was named after him at the college.

In 2010, the Financial Times reported that Rokos was understood to be the buyer of Domenichino's great baroque painting of "Saint John the Evangelist (Domenichino)" (1620s). The painting sold at Christie's in December 2010 to a US buyer but its export was deferred. At that point a new buyer – believed to be Rokos – came forward to buy the painting and lend it to the National Gallery. Rokos was amongst major donors who in 2012 contributed to the National Gallery's successful Appeal to save Titians's Diana and Actaeon for the nation.

In 2026, Rokos committed £190 million to the University of Cambridge to establish the Rokos School of Government. The donation, which consists of an initial £130 million gift and £60 million in matching funds, is the largest single gift to a British university in modern times. The school is intended to prepare future leaders to address global challenges by integrating the study of technology and the sciences with public policy and the humanities. It will be located in the university's West Cambridge Innovation District and is designed to become a global hub for policy research and education.

Rokos has supported other initiatives at Cambridge, including the Girton Rokos internship programme and the Alexander Crummell PhD scholarship at Queens' College.

== Personal life ==
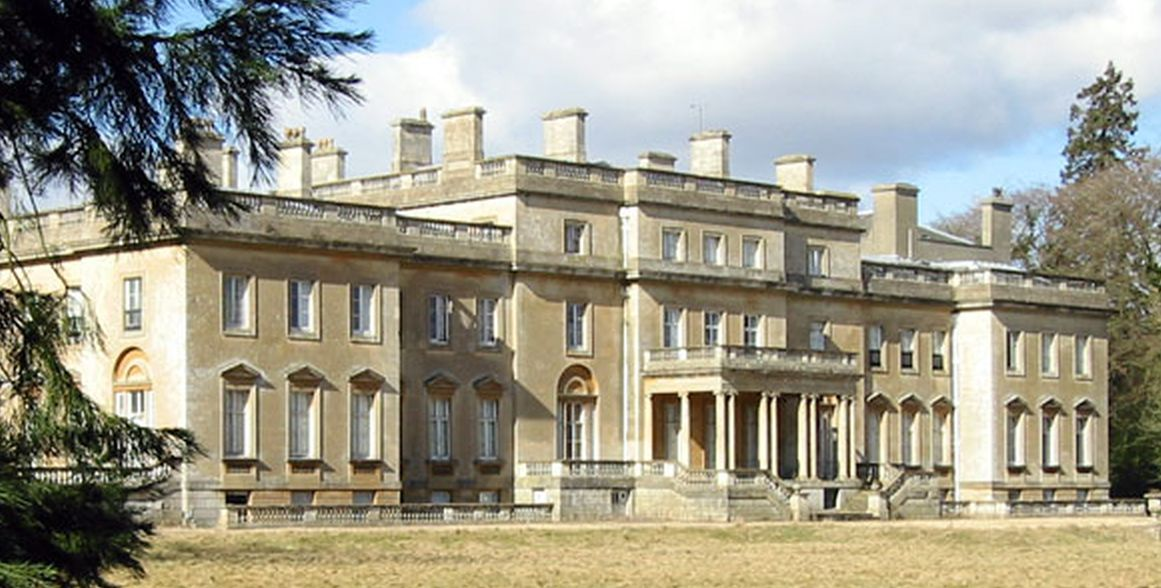
Tottenham House, Wiltshire, east front, in 2006

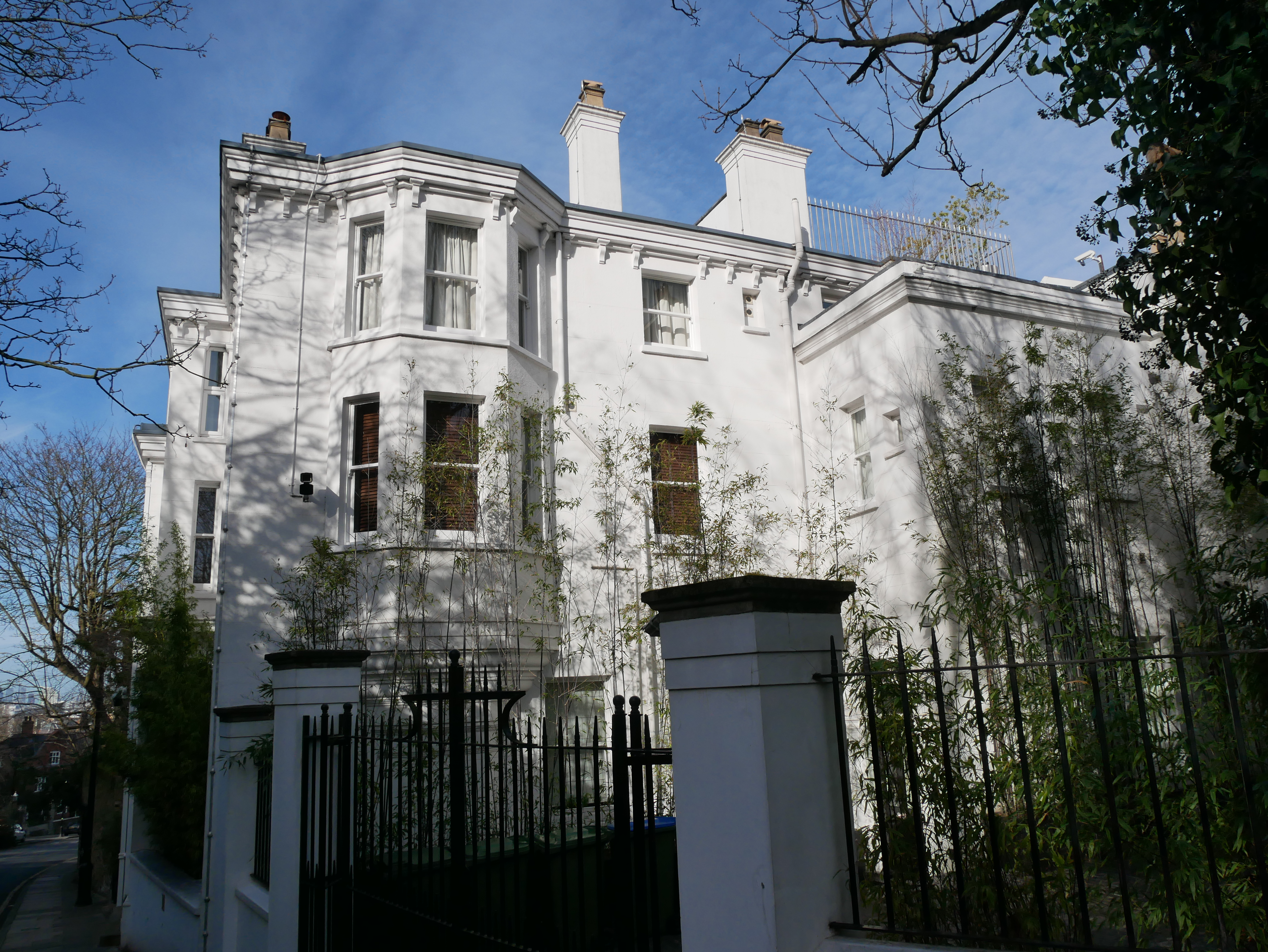
Hillside, Greenwich in 2023

In 2007, he bought a run-down four-storey Grade II listed hotel in Pembridge Square, Kensington, London for £18 million, and in 2009 was ordered to pay for low-cost council housing in exchange for planning permission for a £20 million remodelling including four underground levels and two swimming pools. In 2012, the local council again rejected his proposed plans for a 3,000 square metres home.

He also owns Hillside on Crooms Hill in Greenwich, London, opposite Jonathan Sumption, Lord Sumption, who successfully blocked Rokos' planning application.

He owns property in Wiltshire including Tottenham House, the Grade I-listed former home of the Earl of Cardigan, near Marlborough. In October 2024, it was reported that he could be liable to planning enforcement action if an application was not submitted and approved for "unlawful" work on the estate.

He bought an ocean-front mansion in Manalapan, Florida in 2017 for $40 million. It was listed for sale in February 2025 for $150 million, and sold in 2026 for about $81 million.
