= Cristina Penasco =

Spanish economist

Cristina Peñasco is a Spanish economist whose research focuses on climate and energy economics, innovation policy, and policy evaluation. She is a senior research economist at the Banque de France, an affiliated researcher at Sciences Po and the Bennett School for Public Policy at the University of Cambridge, a member of the Scientific Council of the Elcano Royal Institute, and an associate editor of Climate Policy.

== Education ==
Peñasco holds a PhD in economics from the Spanish National Research Council (CSIC) and Rey Juan Carlos University. She also holds an MPhil in research in economics and business from ICADE Business School in Spain.

== Career ==
Peñasco joined the Banque de France from the University of Cambridge, where she was a tenured associate professor in public policy in the Department of Politics and International Studies and director of the MPhil in Public Policy from 2020 to 2023. At the Banque de France, she is a senior research economist in climate economics in the General Directorate for Financial Stability and Operations, at the Centre for Climate and Nature (CCN), and contributes to coordinating the expert research network of the Network for Greening the Financial System.

She is also affiliated with Sciences Po through the Laboratory for Interdisciplinary Evaluation of Public Policies (LIEPP) and teaches in the School of Public Affairs. At Cambridge, she is a Fellow in Economics at Queens' College, Cambridge and remains affiliated as a researcher to the Bennett School for Public Policy, and the Centre for the Environment, Energy and Natural Resource Governance.

Peñasco is a member of the Scientific Council of the Elcano Royal Institute. She is also an associate editor of Climate Policy, a world-class peer-reviewed academic journal publishing research and analysis on climate policy.

She has also contributed to the Centre for Economic Policy Research (CEPR) through VoxEU, including a 2025 column on public trust, electricity systems, and Europe's energy transition.

== Public commentary and media ==
A 2021 profile in Lanza Digital described Peñasco's academic trajectory and research on sustainable economics and climate change at the University of Cambridge.

During COP26, she was interviewed in El Periódico in an article by Valentina Raffio on the first week of the Glasgow climate summit.

She also appeared on The Debate on France 24 on 3 November 2025 in a discussion on climate resilience and rising temperatures.

In 2024, she co-authored a Le Monde opinion piece on COP29 and green growth in France with Tanya Filer.

== Awards and recognition ==
In 2021, Peñasco received the Regional Studies, Regional Science Best Referee Award from the Regional Studies Association. In the same year, she received an Energy SSH Innovation Award for policy and practice engagement related to the Decarbonisation Policy Evaluation Tool (DPET).
