= Home Bargains =

British variety retailer

Coordinates: 53°27′51.6″N 2°53′57″W

T.J. Morris Limited
- Type: Private
- Industry: Retail
- Founded: Old Swan, Liverpool, England (1976; 50 years ago)
- Founder: Tom Morris
- Headquarters: Liverpool
- Number of locations: 600+ (2025)
- Area served: United Kingdom
- Key people: Tom Morris (Managing Director); Joe Morris (Operations Director); Paul Rowland (Finance Director)
- Products: Groceries, general merchandise
- Brands: Denby Pottery Company
- Revenue: ▲£2.5 billion (2019)
- Operating income: ▲£498.3 million (2016)
- Net income: ▲£184 million (2019)
- Owner: T J Morris Group Limited
- Website: Consumer website Corporate website

T.J. Morris Limited, trading as Home Bargains, is a British variety store and garden centre chain founded in 1976 by Tom Morris in Liverpool, England, as Home and Bargain (later stylised as Home + Bargain).

== History ==
The retailer was founded by owner Tom Morris in 1976 as a single store called Home and Bargain in Old Swan, Liverpool when he was aged 21. The name was changed to Home Bargains in 1995, but is still colloquially referred to by its original name in the Merseyside area.

Morris, who was reported to have still owned an 89% stake in the business as of 2013, operates the company with his brother Joe. The business has since grown to become one of the largest privately owned companies within the United Kingdom, selling a variety of household items including food, clothing and games.

Customer numbers were estimated to be in excess of three million in February 2013, with items sold typically consisting of 70% regular lines and the rest as one-off product lines. The retailer was ranked sixth in a Which? list of 100 Top Stores, making them the highest ranking retailer within the United Kingdom.

=== Growth ===
From 1977, annual growth was around 20–25%. They opened their first warehouse in Prescot in 1979. They then moved to the Rocket Warehouse in 1983. Then, in 1994, they moved to another warehouse, Fallows Way. The retailer gained approval in January 2008 to construct new headquarters in Merseyside, which it estimated would create seven hundred jobs at the Axis business park, Croxteth, as it constructed a ten-storey distribution centre and retail training facility.

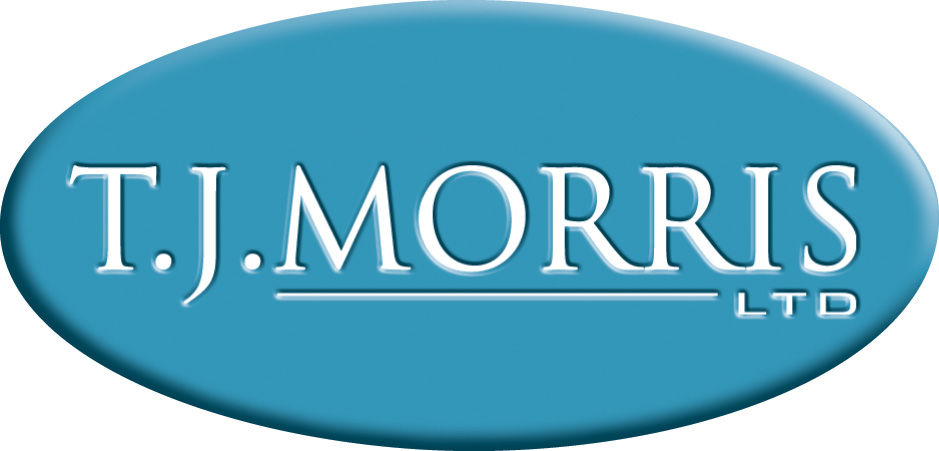
Corporate logo

A £70m distribution centre began construction in October 2013 in Wiltshire, England, as a duplicate of their 700,000 sq ft (65,000 m^{2}) facility that they had opened at its Liverpool headquarters some years prior, in order that their expansion plans could be maintained.

In January 2023, Home Bargains announced that the company had purchased rival discount retailer Quality Save for an undisclosed amount. The purchase came after Quality Save reported it had made a loss of more than £64,000 for the 12 months, compared to a prior £1.3m profit the year before despite having an increase of £3.7 million turnover, all Quality Save stores will convert to the Home Bargains name and brand.

In 25 August 2026, it was confirmed that the Denby Pottery Company brand was saved by an unidentified buyer from administration, confirmed to be Home Bargains.

== Business operations ==
=== Sales strategies ===
The strap line of the retailer is "Top Brands, Bottom Prices", with operations director Joe Morris explaining their business model of acquiring stock at the same cost price as the larger supermarkets, but selling them to the public at a cheaper price.

In August 2011, Home Bargains opened a website to enable customers to shop with them online.

=== Stores and branding ===
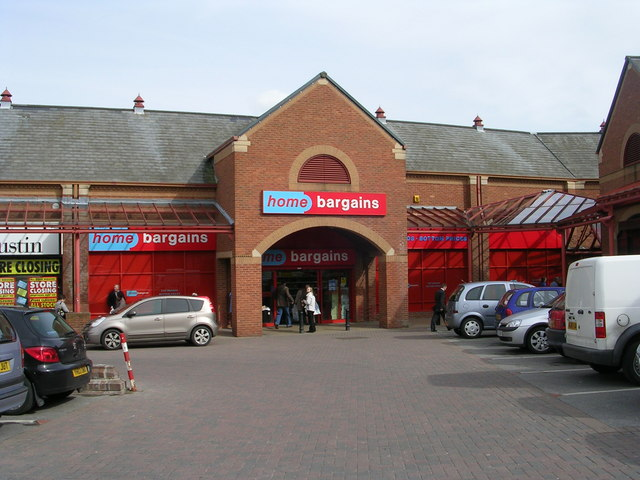
Home Bargains branch in Morley, West Yorkshire (2010)

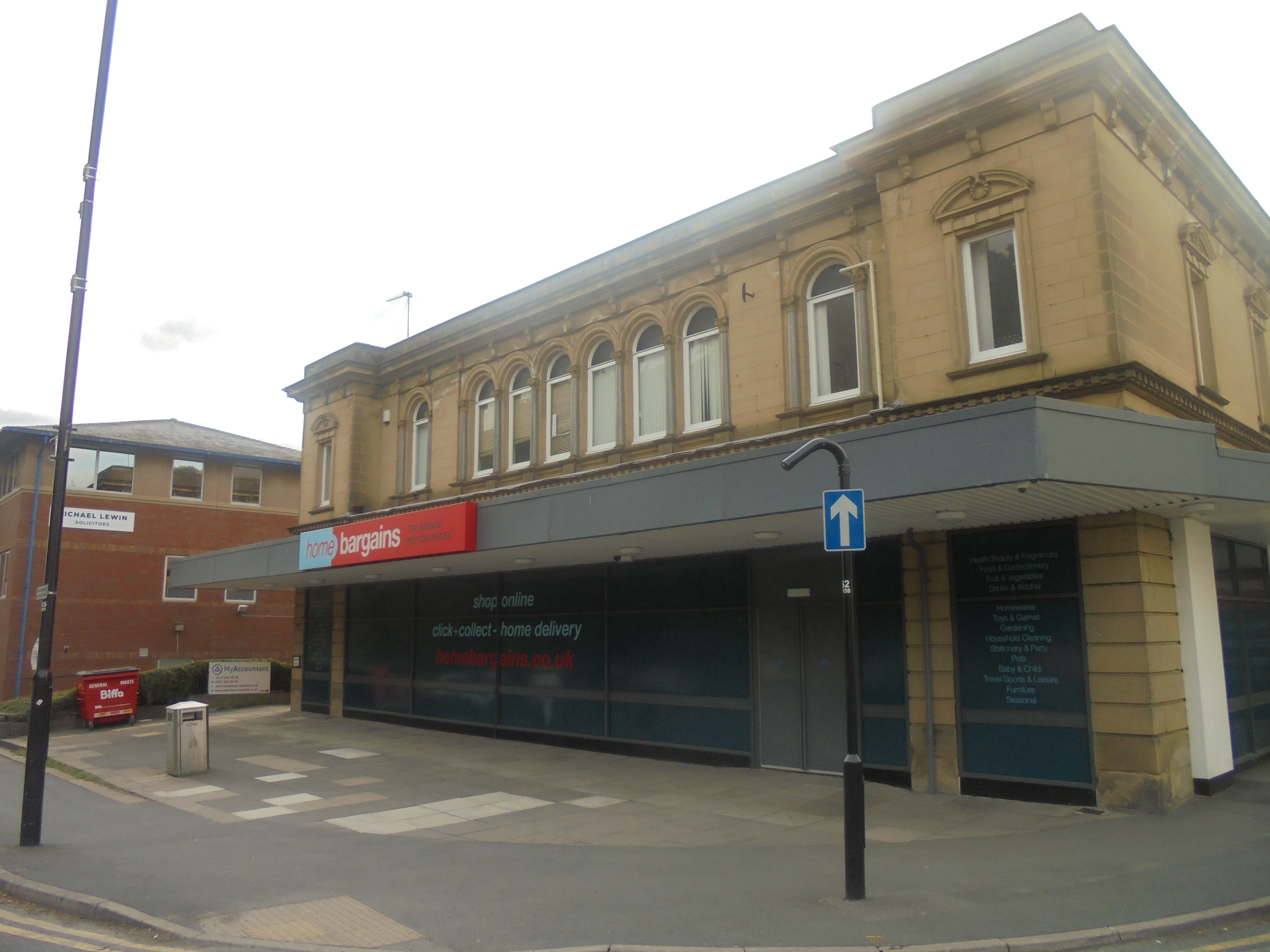
Home Bargains branch in Oakwood, Leeds. (2018)

Home Bargains stores have red and blue branding. Most are centrally located though several are in out of town retail parks. Stores range from small to medium outlets, with the retail park outlets being slightly larger. Store sizes in 2013 were typically between 10,000 sq ft (930 m^{2}) and 25,000 sq ft (2,300 m^{2}).

In January 2009, the retailer acquired fourteen former Woolworths stores from administrators. These stores include Cardiff and Port Talbot in Wales. In Fife, Scotland, two former Woolworths stores have been opened in shopping centres in Glenrothes and Kirkcaldy.

== Corporate affairs ==
=== National expansion ===
The retailer had aspirations to expand in countries outside of England and Wales in 2007, though owner Tom Morris was keen to ensure such expansion was controlled to avoid the risk of over expansion. The retailer announced in October 2008 that preparations are underway to expand into Scotland for the first time, opening their first store in Rutherglen in December 2008.

By March 2009, the company aimed to have six stores within the area of Glasgow, employing more than two hundred people. In February 2010, the company's £25 million Northern Ireland expansion plan was announced, with plans to have opened up to twenty five stores by 2015, to add to their then portfolio of 190 stores.

=== Financial performance ===
The retailer has seen strong sales growth over the past few years, with turnover more than doubling in a four-year period (2011 to 2015).

In 2009, the firm was aiming to be turning over £1bn a year by 2015, having grown the number of its stores to 350, with the potential for six hundred across the United Kingdom. Their turnover exceeded the £1billion mark in 2013, two years earlier than initially anticipated. The retailer aimed to reach the £2billion annual turnover mark by 2020, but reached this target during 2018.

Year ending	Turnover (£b)	Profit			
Year ending	Turnover (£b)	Gross (£b)	Operating (£m)	Pre-tax (£m)	Net (£m)
30 June 2009	0.481	0.136	43.5	42.6	29.8
30 June 2010	0.590	0.167	48.5	47.9	33.4
30 June 2011	0.721	0.208	59.8	59.5	42.5
30 June 2012	0.914	0.254	84.0	84.2	59.7
30 June 2013	1.058	0.313	110.4	110.9	82.6
30 June 2014	1.277	0.377	124.5	124.8	95.3
30 June 2015	1.472	0.445	146.7	147.1	115.1
30 June 2016	1.602	0.498	136.9	137.0	106.8
30 June 2017	1.869	0.578	168.0	168.2	133.0
30 June 2018	2.143	0.677	201.2	202.7	163.9
30 June 2019	2.470	0.777	230.9	233.3	184.4
30 June 2020	2.791	0.886	260.0	262.7	210.0
30 June 2021	3.338	1.086	394.3	396.7	315.7
30 June 2022	3.419	1.061	289.9	293.2	239.2
30 June 2023	3.774	1.555	320.6	332.4	256.7
30 June 2024	4.029	1.350	434.4	454.8	336.1

== Affiliates ==
Home Bargains was also the supplier of to its sister discount chain Quality Save, which had a similar logo (creating confusion among customers) whom it supplied all stock, shop fittings, trolleys and tills, until they closed in 2024. Most Quality Save stores are now known as Home Bargains instead, after the 2023 acquisition.

== Sporting ventures ==
From April 2013 until January 2016, Home Bargains were kit sponsors of League 2 side Tranmere Rovers in a "six figure" deal, replacing long-term sponsors Wirral Council. The sponsorship ended when the club signed a three-year sponsorship deal with B&M Waste Services. Since October 2019, they have been the kit sponsors of League One side Bolton Wanderers. In 2021, Home Bargains signed a three-year principal shirt partner deal with Super League club St Helens for the 2022–2024 seasons.

== Litigation ==
The retailer was fined over £20,000 in February 2017, after being caught selling phone chargers that risked exploding. The chargers had been imported from China yet had not undergone sufficient safety checks by the retailer, despite Trading Standards having carried out five failed safety checks on the product.

Despite being able to produce a Chinese test certificate indicating that a sample product was safety compliant, Home Bargains subsequently admitted to three offences of electrical safety through the sale of unsafe chargers during 2015.

== See also ==
- B&M
- Poundstretcher
- Bargain Buys
