= Massimo Ambrosetti =

Italian diplomat

- Education: University of Padua; University of Cambridge (M.St. in International Relations); Georgetown University (D.L.A.)
- Occupation: Diplomat
- Known for: Italian Ambassador to China; Former Ambassador to Panama and Eastern Caribbean
- Awards: Commander of the Order of Merit of the Italian Republic (2013)

Massimo Ambrosetti is an Italian diplomat serving, as of 2024, as the Italian Republic's ambassador to the People's Republic of China. He previously served as Italian ambassador to Panama and the Eastern Caribbean.

Ambrosetti was educated at the University of Padua and received a Master of Studies in international relations from the University of Cambridge and a Doctor of Liberal Arts from Georgetown University. In 2013, he was invested into the Order of Merit of the Italian Republic at the grade of Commander.
