= Rokos School of Government =

Department of the University of Cambridge

The Rokos School of Government is a planned academic department at the University of Cambridge scheduled to open in Autumn 2026.

The school was established with the support of a £190 million donation from Chris Rokos, described by the Financial Times in 2026 as "the biggest-ever gift to a UK university". According to the university, it will be housed in a new facility to be constructed in the Cambridge West Innovation District.

== See also ==
- Department of Politics and International Studies, University of Cambridge
