= Rokos Capital Management =

British investment manager

- Type: Private
- Industry: Investment management
- Founded: 2015; 11 years ago
- Founder: Chris Rokos
- Headquarters: 23 Savile Row, London
- AUM: $22 billion (October 2026)
- Website: www.rokoscapital.com

Rokos Capital Management LLP (RCM) is a British Alternative Investment Fund Manager (AIFM). RCM is headquartered in London, with offices in New York, Washington DC and Singapore. It is authorised and regulated by the UK Financial Conduct Authority (Reference number 679721). The firm has around 200 employees.

== History ==
RCM was founded in 2015 by Chris Rokos, a co-founder of hedge fund Brevan Howard, where he made $4 billion for the firm's investors from 2003 to 2012.

In October 2019, Rokos was taking responsibility for all individual allocations of capital. A spokesman was reported by the Financial Times as saying that the move would, “maximise the efficient deployment of capital”. They added, “The adjustment forms part of RCM’s ongoing efforts to manage fund capital as efficiently as possible in order to maximise returns for investors.”

According to the Financial Times, RCM “specializes in betting how broad economic trends will affect global markets, in areas such as interest rates, foreign exchange, equities, credit and commodities.”

RCM marked its first full calendar year of trading with a gain of approximately 20 per cent. RCM was one of a number of hedge funds which had wrongly predicted the 2016 UK referendum vote on EU membership. Despite the result, the firm gained more than 2.5 per cent in the days immediately after the vote. The New York Times commented, “His ability to make money even when caught flat-footed, his admirers say, is a sign of his nimbleness as a trader.”

The strong performance of RCM in 2016 was followed by two lacklustre years, reflecting a difficult trading period for macro hedge funds. Notwithstanding the market challenges, Rokos continued to build out the firm in readiness for the return of more favourable market conditions, and in 2019 RCM recorded a gain of 9.3%.

In April 2020, Bloomberg reported that RCM had posted its best monthly gain of 14% in March and had reopened the fund to new investors. 2020 proved to be a successful year, gaining 44%. 2021 though proved to be a more difficult market for RCM and other macro hedge funds. RCM eventually reported a loss for the year of 26%.

In 2022, RCM attracted $1 billion of new investment. Bloomberg's Mark Gilbert commented, “Handing $1 billion to a hedge fund manager who lost a record 26% last year might seem like the ultimate example of throwing good money after bad. But the customers bankrolling an expansion of the $12 billion firm run by billionaire, Chris Rokos, know exactly what they’re doing – backing an investor who swings for the fences in the expectation that the good years will overcompensate for the bad. That’s the point of the asset class.”

Gilbert continued, “Rokos, who was a founding partner of Brevan Howard Asset Management LLP, has a proven track record of making money in the past quarter of a century. Documents filed as part of a lawsuit he initiated in 2014 to annul restrictions on him setting up his own shop, revealed he generated $165 million for Goldman Sachs between 1995 and 1997. He then joined Credit Suisse, producing $340 million between 1999 and 2001. During his tenure at Brevan Howard, Rokos delivered almost $4 billion in profit.”

In June 2022, the Financial Times reported that high levels of inflation and supply chain bottlenecks had created the best conditions for hedge funds trading bonds and currency markets since the 2008 financial crisis. For the six months ending June 30, 2022, RCM reported gains of 12%.

In January 2023, Bloomberg reported that 2022 had proven to be the most successful year for Rokos Capital Management since its creation, returning a gain of 51%. It said that the firm was “tapping in to the rising demand for macro hedge funds” and that it was in talks with its investors to grow assets under management by as much as $3 billion. In 2024, RCM returned approximately 31%, followed by a 21% gain in 2025.

== Philanthropy ==
In September 2020, in reaction to the murder of George Floyd, RCM announced they would improve workplace diversity and support educational facilities. The firm provides financial support to a project in the London Borough of Haringey called Chrysalis East, aimed at maximising the educational outcomes of children, many of whom are from an ethnic minority background. RCM also worked with Amos Bursary, which provides support from the age of 16 until the time of leaving university to young men and women of African and Caribbean descent from schools all over London.
