= Law Kar Po =

Hong Kong billionaire businessman

- 羅家寶
- Born: 1947 or 1948 (age 77–78)
- Occupation: Businessman
- Title: Chairman, Park Hotel Group
- Children: 3, including Allen Law
- Relatives: Kenneth Lo (brother)

Law Kar Po (Chinese: 羅家寶; born 1947/1948) is a Hong Kong billionaire businessman, chairman of the Park Hotel Group.

Law Kar Po is the founder, retailer, and franchisor of the apparel brand Bossini—Kar-po where he grew his father’s textile empire and eventually shifted its focus into property and hotels.

He is the chairman of the Park Hotel and Park Capital Group. Park Hotel Group manages 12 hotels in eight cities and five countries in the Asia-Pacific region. His elder brother is fellow billionaire Kenneth Lo.

As of June 2021, Forbes estimated his net worth at US$6.1 billion.

He is the father of Allen Law, who is the chief executive officer (CEO) of Park Hotel Group.
