= Mark Coombs =

British businessman

- Born: Mark Langhorn Coombs; April 1960 (age 66)
- Education: Dulwich College; St John's College, Cambridge
- Occupations: CEO, Ashmore Group
- Spouse: Rebecca Coombs

Mark Langhorn Coombs (born April 1960) is a British billionaire businessman, CEO of the Ashmore Group.

== Early life ==
Mark Langhorn Coombs was born in April 1960, and was educated at Dulwich College and St John's College, Cambridge with a degree in law.

== Career ==
Coombs' first career job was in 1983 in the Latin American department at Grindlays Bank, which was later acquired by the Australia and New Zealand Banking Group. In 1998, he started Ashmore as a new division of the company. In 1999, Coombs led a management buyout, and took Ashmore public in 2006. He later bought the money manager Emerging Market Management. In 2007, he held 42.5% of the Ashmore Group.

In 2019, Coombs disposed of 10 million shares in Ashmore Group, which earned him £43.5 million. According to the Sunday Times Rich List in 2020, Coombs is worth £1.42 billion, a decrease of £88 million from 2019. In February 2026, Mark Coombs was listed on the Sunday Times Tax list with an estimated £19.3 million.

== Personal life ==
Coombs is reported to live with his wife Rebecca in Wimbledon, London.
