= International Workplace Group =

British holding company

International Workplace Group plc
- Type: Public
- Traded as: LSE: IWG; FTSE 250 component
- Industry: Industrial services
- Founded: 1989, Brussels, Belgium
- Founder: Mark Dixon
- Headquarters: Saint Helier, Jersey (registered office); Zug, Switzerland (head office)
- Number of locations: 4,000 locations
- Key people: Douglas Sutherland, Chairman; Mark Dixon, CEO
- Products: Serviced offices, coworking
- Revenue: ▲US$3,762 million (2025)
- Operating income: ▲US$143 million (2025)
- Net income: ▼US$15 million (2025)
- Number of employees: 10,000 (2026)
- Website: iwgplc.com

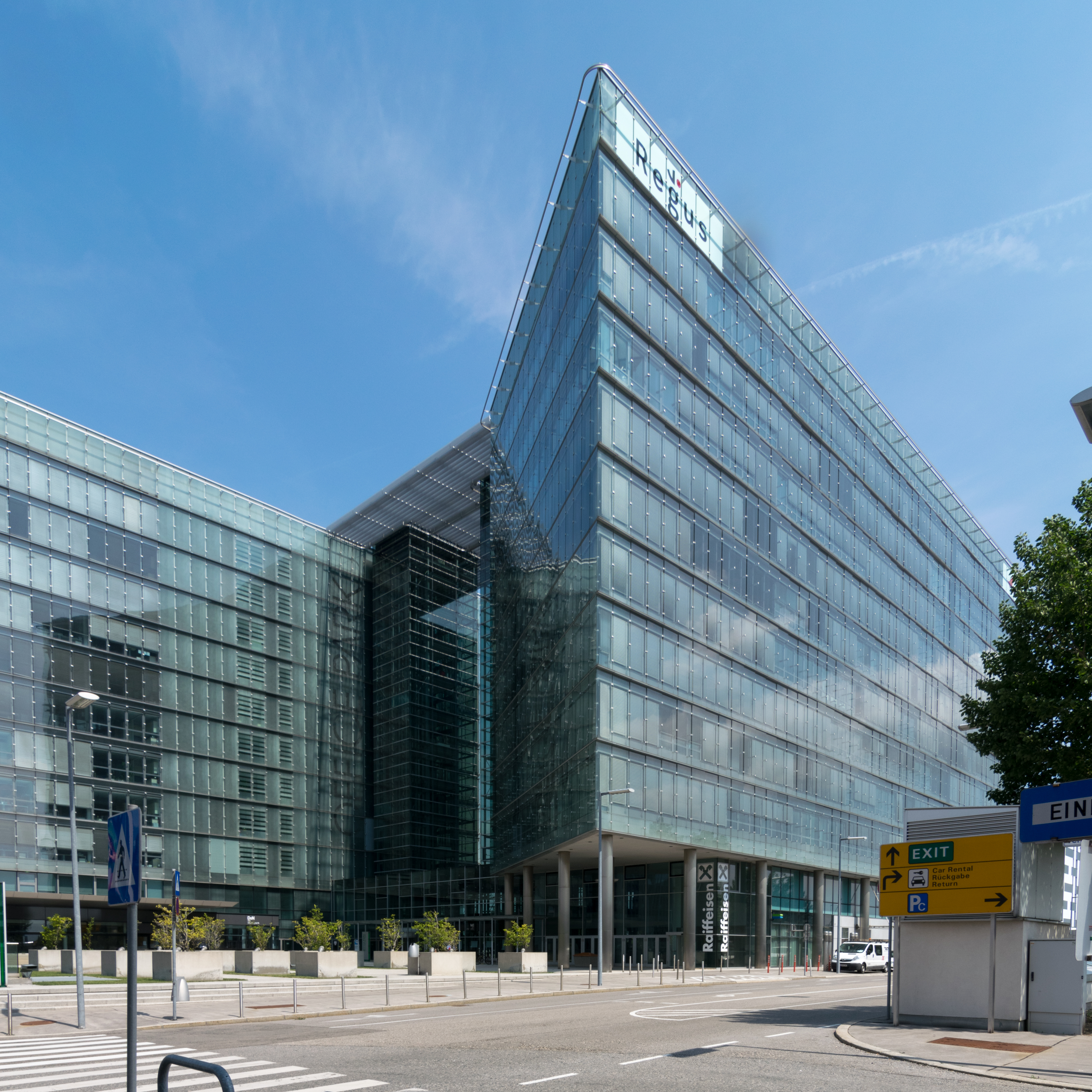
Regus Austria, Vienna

International Workplace Group plc, formerly Regus, is a Swiss-based company offering serviced offices and coworking. It provides serviced offices under several brand-names, including Regus. It was started in Brussels, Belgium, by Mark Dixon in 1989. It is registered in Saint Helier, Jersey, and has its head office in Zug, Switzerland. It is listed on the London Stock Exchange and is a constituent of the FTSE 250 Index.

== History ==
The company was founded as "Regus" by English entrepreneur Mark Dixon with the objective of providing flexible office space to customers in Brussels in 1989. In 1994, Regus entered Latin America with a centre in São Paulo and Asia with its first centre in Beijing.

=== 2000s ===
The company completed a successful IPO on the London Stock Exchange in 2000. In 2001, it acquired Stratis Business Centers, a U.S.-based network of franchised business centres. Five Regus employees died in the September 11 attacks, as Regus had a business centre on the 93rd floor of the South Tower. The company was criticised for a lack of response to the victims' families, though a Regus official said they had made "proactive outreach to every family of the team members who are missing."

In 2002, the company sold a controlling stake (58%) of its UK business to Rex 2002 Limited, a company created by the private equity firm Alchemy Partners. This move raised £51 million for the company, which had been facing severe financial difficulties. In 2003, Regus filed for Chapter 11 bankruptcy protection for its U.S. business, which had been struggling in the wake of the dot-com bubble. A year later, it took its U.S. business out of Chapter 11 after restructuring, financed by its share of the profitable UK business.

The company acquired HQ Global Workplaces, workplace provider based in the U.S. in 2004. It re-acquired the Regus UK business in 2006 for £88 million. The company went on to acquire Laptop Lane, a chain of American airport business centres, later that year. In 2006, the company entered partnerships with Air France-KLM and American Airlines for preferred access for business travellers and in 2007, it entered a partnership with American Express for preferred access for their Business Platinum cardholders. Also, in 2006, Regus established sites at Amsterdam Schiphol and Brussels Airport.

In 2007, Regus opened business centres in Bulgaria and the Middle East. In June 2008, Regus introduced Businessworld, a multi-level membership service for flexible access to its services in any of its locations. Effective 14 October 2008, Regus Group plc became Regus plc. Regus plc was created as a holding company for Regus Group plc, to establish the company's headquarters in Luxembourg and its registered office in Jersey. Regus has maintained a policy of expansion, opening new business centres. It has also renegotiated some leasing agreements with property owners in the UK to save money, warning owners that the vehicles holding the leases could go into administration (bankruptcy); this has angered the British property industry.

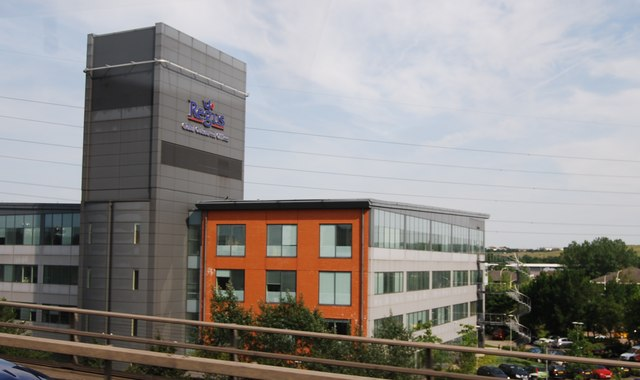
A Regus Hotel and Conference Centre near Dartford

A legal case involving Epcot Solutions Ltd and Regus, decided in the Court of Appeal in 2008, involved assessing whether the standard exclusion clause in Regus' terms and conditions could be justified. Epcot complained about Regus' failure to maintain air conditioning at its Stockley Park business centre in west London. The judge at first instance had ruled that Regus' exclusion clause was unreasonable but the Court of Appeal reversed this ruling.

=== 2010s ===
On 5 July 2012, UK Prime Minister David Cameron announced that Regus would provide 30,000 young entrepreneurs across England with access to its network of offices, complementing the Government's StartUp Loans scheme managed by James Caan. On 19 February 2013, the firm took control of MWB BE, a large UK-based serviced office provider with a £65.6m cash bid.

In 2015, Regus acquired Spaces – a coworking company founded in 2006 in the Netherlands. In the same year, Regus partnered with the Singapore Government to open facilities within their public libraries.

In December 2016, under a scheme of arrangement, the company established a new holding company IWG (International Workplace Group) and announced its intention to move its base outside the European Union referring to the "increasingly complex legislative environment". The new head office was established in Zug, Switzerland.

In 2019 IWG had approximately 3,000 coworking spaces in around 120 countries.

=== 2020 to present ===
In 2020, as a result of the COVID-19 pandemic, IWG experienced financial difficulties; over a few months it filed for Chapter 11 bankruptcy for 97 different entities connected to both Regus and its co-working brand Spaces. The rise of more localised working in the wake of the Coronavirus pandemic led to suburban locations becoming among the company's fastest-growing locations.

In February 2021, IWG acquired a majority stake in The Wing women's co-working network, which subsequently ceased operations on 30 August 2022.

In March 2022, IWG merged its digital business with The Instant Group. Digital assets included in the transaction included Easyoffices.com, Meetingo.com, Rovva and Worka.

IWG opened a location at Battersea Power Station, The Engine Room, within the Grade II-listed Boiler House, in June 2023. It is the first flexible workspace to open at the redeveloped London landmark.

In June 2024, IWG confirmed its name change to International Workplace Group plc. The name change was accompanied by the shifting of its reporting currency and the denomination of its shares from sterling to US dollars.
