= Kenneth Lo (businessman) =

Hong Kong billionaire and chairman of Crystal Group

Kenneth Lo Lok Fung
- Born: October 1938 (age 87)
- Citizenship: British
- Occupation: Businessman
- Title: Chairman, Crystal Group
- Spouse: Yvonne Lo
- Children: 4, including Andrew Lo
- Relatives: Law Kar Po (brother)

Kenneth Lo Lok Fung (Chinese: 羅樂風; born October 1938) is a Hong Kong billionaire businessman, chairman of the clothing manufacturer Crystal Group.

== Early life ==
Kenneth Lo was born in mainland China in October 1938, the oldest son of Hong Kong businessman Law Ting Pong, also in the textiles industry. Lo and his family moved to Hong Kong when he was young, initially living in a refugee camp, where they survived off of meal coupons from the United Nations. Lo began working in his parents' garment factory at age 14.

His younger brother is fellow billionaire Law Kar Po.

== Career ==
Lo's Crystal Group, which he established in 1970 with his wife, employs over 74,000 people in 20 locations, and an annual turnover of over US$2.5 billion. The company began as a small sweater factory, but now manufactures clothes for major brands such as H&M, Levi's, and Marks & Spencer. Lo stepped down from day-to-day operations in 2008, but remains involved with the company.

As of March 2022, Forbes estimated his net worth at US$1.0 billion.

== Personal life ==
Lo's wife is Yvonne Lo (Chinese: 羅蔡玉清), co-founder and vice chairman of Crystal Group. They have four children, and reside in Hong Kong. Their son, Andrew Lo, is CEO of Crystal Group.
