= Rohan Sajdeh =

Australian management consultant

Personal information
- Full name: Rohan Kewal Sajdeh
- Born: 13 August 1974 (age 52); Darwin, Northern Territory, Australia
- Batting: Right-handed
- Bowling: Right-arm leg break
- Role: All-rounder

Domestic team information
- Years: Team
- 1999: Cambridge University

Career statistics
| Competition | First-class |
|---|---|
| Matches | 1 |
| Runs scored | 12 |
| Batting average | 6.00 |
| 100s/50s | 0/0 |
| Top score | 12 |
| Balls bowled | 222 |
| Wickets | 0 |
| Bowling average | – |
| 5 wickets in innings | – |
| 10 wickets in match | – |
| Best bowling | – |
| Catches/stumpings | 0/– |
- Source: CricketArchive, 9 November 2012

Rohan Kewal Sajdeh (born 13 August 1974) is an Australian management consultant. He is currently a senior partner and managing director of the Boston Consulting Group (BCG), in their Chicago office.

Of Indian descent, and born in Darwin, Australia, Sajdeh attended the University of Technology, Sydney, graduating with a Bachelor of Business and the university medal. After a two-year stint at The Boston Consulting Group in Sydney, he obtained a Master of Management degree from the Kellogg School of Management at Northwestern University, before attending the University of Cambridge, where he received a Master of Philosophy degree, specializing in international relations. Whilst at Cambridge, he played for the Cambridge University Cricket Club at a first-class level, including playing in the coveted Oxford-Cambridge 50-over match. He also played field hockey for the university's First XI. While at BCG Rohan has become the business strategist and growth-creator for consumer-facing and sports businesses, working for clients across the globe. He is currently BCG's global topic leader in both the Customer-centricity and Sports areas. Sajdeh was a key participant in a BCG presentation to the International Cricket Council in 2009, which incorporated an overhaul of the current international programming system. Today, he is one of three independent Board Directors for US Cricket, a published author (Rocket - on Consumer marketing), a film Executive Producer (Doosra - a socio-sports film currently in production) and a Founder's Circle member for the America India Foundation.
