= Dora, Cyprus =

Dora Δορά
- Village
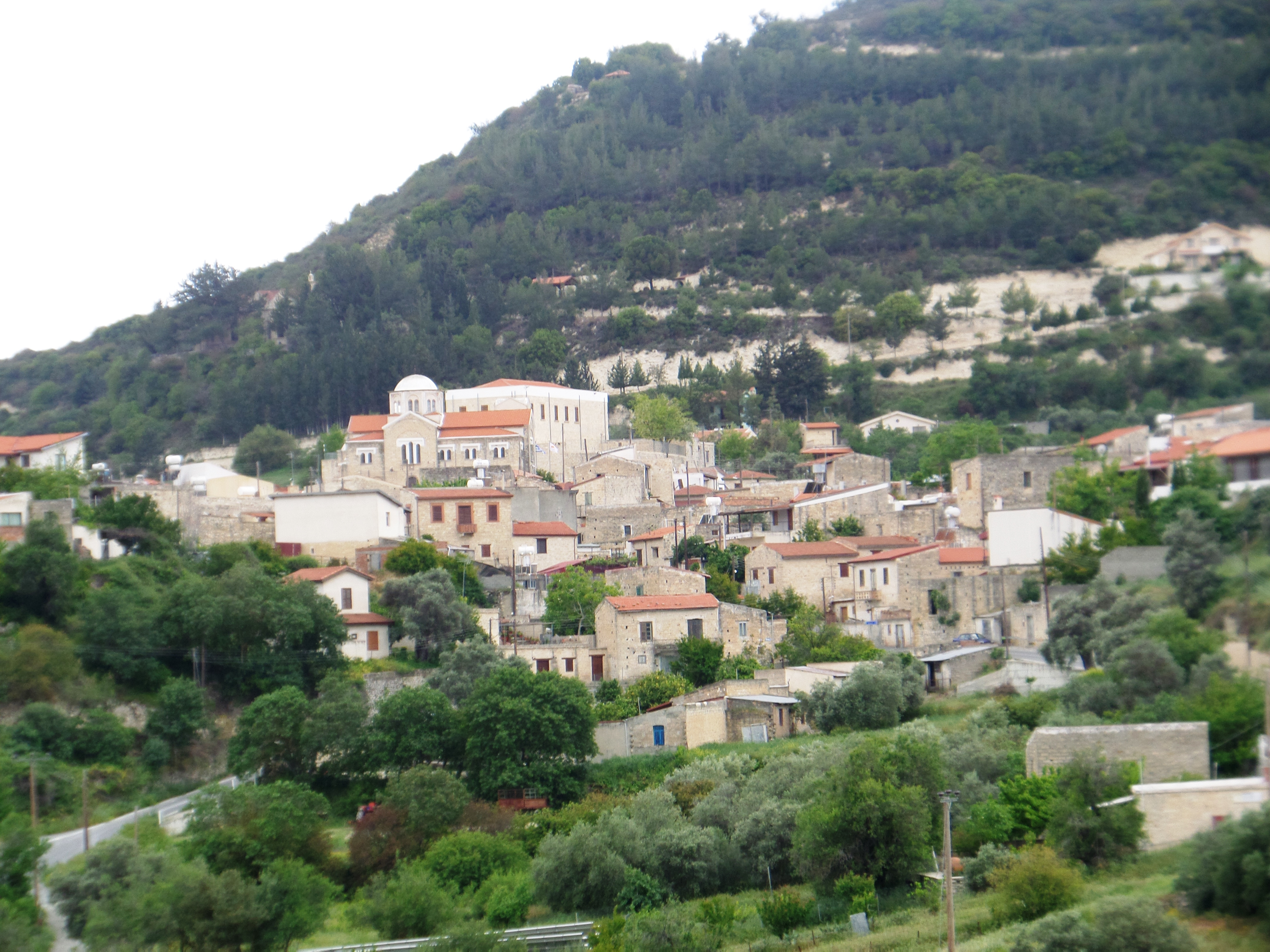

- Location in Cyprus
- Coordinates: 34°46′50″N 32°44′17″E
- Country: Cyprus
- District: Limassol District

Government
  - Body: Community Council of Dora
  - President: Christos Panagi
  - Vice President: Panicos Avgousti

Population (2001)
  - Total: 184
- Time zone: UTC+2 (EET)
  - Summer (DST): UTC+3 (EEST)
- Website: dora.org.cy

Dora (Greek: Δορά, Dhora) is a village in the Limassol District of Cyprus, located 6 km southwest of Malia. Built at an elevation of more than 600 meters, Dora "emerges" between two rivers, Ha and Dirizo. From the above, they predate the particular settlement before the consecutive blows of the Turks, the current village stretches at the foot of Mount Kordylas, said to resemble the hat worn by the ancient Carian, and perhaps synifasmenos to who were the first inhabitants of Dora, the Dorians who came to Cyprus through Caria of Asia Minor.

== Elevation ==
Dora is located 616 m above sea level. The Rok Dorá mountain located in the village has an elevation of 730 m.

== History ==
It is likely that the village was formed through the dissolution of other ancient settlements in the wider area, the remains of which have been identified at various locations. The earliest written references to the village in historical sources date to the period of Frankish rule. According to Louis de Mas Latrie, Dóra constituted a royal estate, which was granted by James II to the nobleman Gabriel Gentile, who served as his personal physician. Following Gentile’s death, the village was granted to Philip Podocataro by Queen Catherine Cornaro.

== Bibliography ==
- Καρούζης, Γιώργος (2001). Περιδιαβάζοντας την Κύπρο: Λεμεσός (πόλη και επαρχία) (πρώτη ed.). Λευκωσία: ΣΕΛΑΣ Κέντρο Μελετών, Ερευνών & Εκδόσεων. p. 107-109. ISBN 9963-566-67-7.
