= Brevan Howard =

European hedge fund company

- Type: Private
- Industry: Investment management
- Founded: 2002; 24 years ago
- Founder: Alan Howard
- Headquarters: Jersey
- Key people: Aron Landy, CEO
- Products: Hedge funds
- AUM: US$ 35-40 billion (as of July 2023)
- Website: brevanhoward.com

Brevan Howard (officially Brevan Howard Asset Management LLP) is a European hedge fund management company based in Jersey with its funds domiciled in the Cayman Islands. Brevan Howard was founded in 2002 by Alan Howard, alongside four other co-founders including Chris Rokos, and is widely considered to be one of the top global macro hedge funds.

Brevan Howard has also been described as one of the largest "macro hedge funds" in the world with assets under management (AUM) having peaked at $40 billion in October 2013 before downsizing to $18 billion in 2016 following a period of suppressed volatility as a result of central bank quantitative easing. By 2020, Brevan Howard was managing around $10 billion in investor assets across its six offices globally where it returned 99%, the best recorded year for the firm amid the COVID-19 global pandemic. Following a resurgence in returns and fresh investor capital, as of October 2022, the fund now manages around $26 billion in assets.

Brevan Howard is known to employ traders from major investment banks, portfolio managers from competing hedge funds, and advanced quantitative analysts. According to one of the company's founding partners, "high turnover is part of the business model" and traders are "cut" if they do not perform up to the company's standards for success. According to one investment consultant, Brevan Howard's standards for success in trading are so high that some traders who have been dismissed from Brevan Howard "have become stars at other firms."

== History ==
On 29 October 2019, Brevan Howard announced that Aron Landy, the chief risk officer since 2003, would replace Alan Howard as CEO. Howard is continuing to be an investment manager with the firm that he co-founded in 2002 with fellow Credit Suisse traders Jean-Philippe Blochet, Chris Rokos, James Vernon, and Trifon Natsis. The company name was created by utilizing portions of the last names of the co-founders. Blochet took a "sabbatical" in 2008, returned and left the firm again in November 2009. Vernon left his position as chief executive officer (CEO) in 2011 but returned to the company as group chief operating officer (COO) in September 2013. Another co-founder, Rokos, retired from the company in 2012. The company received $2 billion to manage in the global macro fund from Credit Suisse Private Bank. Under the leadership of Brevan Howard's founding partner, assets grew to $10.5 billion in 2006. The company generated a 25% return in 2007 and returns from its global macro fund continued to perform well during the Great Recession.

In 2010, the company moved its headquarters from London to Geneva. In July 2012, the firm opened an affiliate firm in New York called Brevan Howard U.S. Investment Management LP which had about $800 million in assets under management. By 2013 the company had established Brevan Howard Capital Management LP on the island of Jersey. As of June 2013 it was reported to be the largest European hedge fund management firm based on its total AUM. An April 2013 article in the Financial News described the company as "the biggest and best-performing [hedge fund management] firm in Europe". In 2015, The company reduced its workforce by about 10% due to reduced management assets and diminishing returns. The fund had further losses in 2014 and 2015 and had only $14.5 billion in assets as of October 2016. By 2016, the firm had reduced its assets under management (AUM) from $41 billion spread across nine funds in 2013 to an $18 billion AUM spread over three funds.

== Investment funds ==
=== History ===
In 2012, a founding partner said the firm's overall strategy is focusing on "near-term opportunities" and establishing investment positions that are maintained for one to six months. As a macro hedge fund, in 2013, the company aspires to profit as a result of "broad economic trends" and trades many types of assets including commodities and currencies.

The firm set up 11 funds including the Brevan Howard Master Fund (BHMF) 2003, Brevan Howard Multi-Strategy Master Fund Limited (BHMS) 2008, Brevan Howard Emerging Markets Strategies Master Fund Limited (BHEMS) 2007, Brevan Howard Credit Catalysts Master Fund Limited (BHCC) 2009, the Brevan Howard Asia Master Fund Limited (BHA) 2004, the Brevan Howard Emerging Markets Local Fixed Income Fund (BHEML), Brevan Howard Credit Catalysts Master Fund Limited ("BHCC"), Brevan Howard Commodities Strategies Master Fund Limited ("BHCS"), Brevan Howard Systematic Trading Master Fund Limited ("BHST"), Brevan Howard Credit Value Master Fund Limited ("BHCV"), Brevan Howard CMBS Master Fund Limited ("BHCMBS"), Brevan Howard Investment Fund II - Macro FX Fund Limited ("BHMFX"), The company also manages three closed-ended feeder funds, listed on the London Stock Exchange. They are: BH Global Limited (BHMG), BH Macro Limited (BHGG) and Brevan Howard Credit Catalysts Limited (BHCC).

Its flagship fund, the Brevan Howard Master Fund Ltd. was capped at $25 billion AUM and closed to new investors in 2012. It had a $28 billion AUM as of October 2013 and was reported to be the 11th most popular hedge fund among institutional investors in the U.S. As of 2013, the Master Fund had averaged a 12 percent annual gain since its inception in 2003. After 10 years the fund reported its first annual loss of 0.8% in 2014. In April 2020, the fund had its best month ever, gaining 17% in March amid the ongoing market turmoil caused by the COVID-19 pandemic.

=== Current ===
As of 2019, the company operates a number of funds, including two publicly-available closed-end funds, BH Global (LSE: BHGG) and BH Macro (LSE: BHMG).

== Corporate affairs ==
Brevan Howard describes itself as a "global alternative asset manager" and maintains offices in London, Geneva, St. Helier, Hong Kong, Singapore, Abu Dhabi, Austin and New York. The company employs more than 1000 people worldwide and more than 40 employees at its offices located on the island of Jersey. Eighty of its employees are traders that receive commissions equal to "11% to 17% of gains." This segment of the employee base includes 15 traders who work at the company's Ramat Gan, Israel office with 38 traders being added to the "global team" of employees in 2012. Geraldine Sundstrom, joined the company in 2007 and was the portfolio manager for the Brevan Howard Emerging Markets Strategies Master Fund Limited. Sundstrom left the company in 2014 when the fund she managed was shut down.

The company operated offices in Singapore from 2007 to 2014.

Brevan Howard has made a variety of philanthropic contributions to the Imperial College Business School (ICBS). The company donated £20.1m over eight years to fund a financial economics research centre. As of 2013 the firm had donated £1.5m to ICBS's, Alan Howard Scholarships for Energy Futures. In 2012, BrevanHoward pledged a £250,000 donation to the ARK Bentworth PrimaryAcademy.
