= Alchemy Partners =

British private equity firm

- Company type: Private
- Industry: Private equity
- Founded: 1997; 29 years ago
- Headquarters: London, United Kingdom
- Key people: Dominic Slade (Managing partner); Ian Cash (partner); Alex Dupée (partner); Alex Leicester (partner); John Rowland (partner, CFO & CFO); Toby Westcott (partner)
- Products: Investments, private equity funds
- AUM: £2.2 billion (2024)
- Number of employees: +40
- Website: www.alchemypartners.co.uk

Alchemy Partners is a British private equity firm, which specialises in investing in distressed and undervalued or underperforming businesses and other special situations through debt and equity throughout Europe.

Alchemy was founded in 1997 by Martin Bolland, Robert Barnes and Jon Moulton. Before launching dedicated distressed vehicles, it invested in other transactions. Notable transactions included Four Seasons Health Care, Alcentra and Phoenix IT.

Alchemy came to public notice in 1999, when it was negotiating to buy Rover Group from BMW; its advisory board members included former Rover MD Kevin Morley. After public protests, the discussions were abandoned when the government imposed additional conditions to the transaction.

Alchemy launched its first distressed debt fund, Alchemy Special Opportunities, in 2006 with a final close of £300m.

Moulton resigned from Alchemy in September 2009, saying that he disagreed with plans by other partners to turn Alchemy into a specialist financial services firm.

Alchemy raised £500m for the second distressed debt fund in 2010 and £600m for Alchemy Special Opportunities Fund III in March 2014. A fourth fund was announced in August 2017, with a final close of $1.2bn in October 2018.

The Funds invest in the debt and equity of public and private companies in the UK and continental Europe. Funding is provided by a large number of blue-chip investors including major banks, pension funds, fund-of-funds, university endowments and high-net-worth individuals. Today the firm manages over £1.5bn.

Alchemy is structured as an advisory business based in London, Alchemy Partners LLP, which advises a fund manager based in Guernsey, Alchemy Partners (Guernsey) Ltd.

== Investments ==
In 2006, Alchemy acquired a majority stake of Revolution Bars Group for a sum of £42.5m.

In November 2011, Alchemy, together with Ashmore, invested $6.43m in Seed Infotech. In May 2014, Alchemy invested in Hampshire Trust Bank. In November 2014, Alchemy, together with American Davidson Kempner Capital Management, invested in French casino operators and online sports betting platform JOA Groupe, acquiring a majority stake.

In January 2015, Alchemy supported London-based Incisive Media in their debt-for-equity restructuring, acquiring a majority stake. In November 2016, Alchemy invested an undisclosed amount in M2 Subsea, the Aberdeen and Houston based provider of remotely operated vehicles for the oil and gas industry. In October 2017, Alchemy sold its stake in JOA Groupe to Blackstone Tactical Opportunities and Kings Park Capital.

In June 2021, Alchemy invested £100m in London-based payment service provider DNA Payments. In October 2021, Alchemy invested $90m in Apollo Group Holdings, an independent Lloyd's specialist insurance and reinsurance group, based in London.
