= Ashmore Group =

British investment management company

Ashmore Group plc

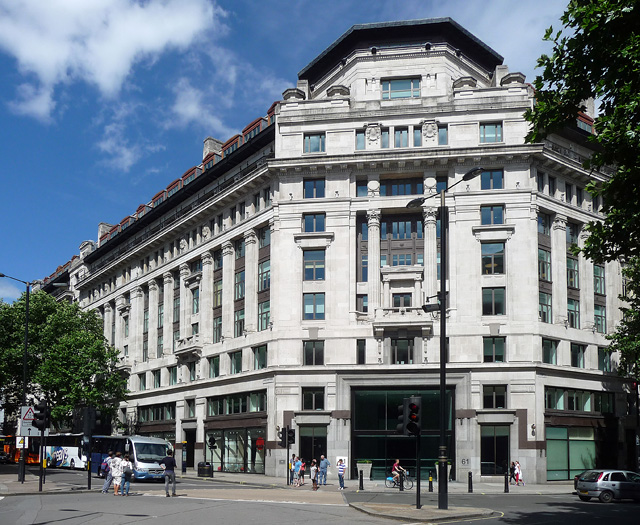
- Headquarters at 61 Aldwych
- Type: Public
- Traded as: LSE: ASHM; FTSE 250 Component; OTC Pink: AJMPF
- Industry: Asset management
- Founded: 1992; 34 years ago
- Headquarters: London, United Kingdom
- Key people: Clive Adamson (chairman); Mark Coombs (CEO)
- Revenue: ▼£140.5 million (2026)
- Operating income: ▲£71.7 million (2026)
- Net income: ▲£107.3 million (2026)
- AUM: ▲£54.0 billion (2026)
- Total assets: ▲£1,070.9 million (2026)
- Total equity: ▲£809.7 million (2026)
- Website: www.ashmoregroup.com

Ashmore Group plc is a large British investment manager dedicated to the emerging markets. Headquartered in London, it is listed on the London Stock Exchange and is a constituent of the FTSE 250 Index.

== History ==
The business, which was established by the Australia and New Zealand Banking Group ('ANZ') to manage the ANZ Emerging Markets Liquid Investment Portfolio in 1992, was bought out from ANZ by its management team in 1999. It was the subject of an Initial public offering on the London Stock Exchange in 2006 and it acquired the Virginia-based firm, Emerging Markets Management L.L.C., in 2011.

== Operations ==
The company, which specialises in emerging market investments, had $47.6 billion under management as at 30 June 2025.
