= Duncan Bell (historian) =

British academic

Professor Duncan Bell FBA
- Born: 31 December 1976 (age 49); Birmingham, England
- Education: King's College London (B.A.); Jesus College, Cambridge (M.Phil, PhD)
- Occupation: Academic

Duncan Bell (born 31 December 1976) is professor of Political Thought and International Relations at the University of Cambridge, and a Fellow of Christ's College, Cambridge.

== Biography ==
Bell's first degree was a BA in War Studies from King's College London (1995–1998). He was awarded an M.Phil. in International Relations (1999) and a PhD in History (2004) from the University of Cambridge, where he was a student at Jesus College. During the academic year 2000–2001 he was a Fulbright Scholar in the Department of Political Science at Columbia University. After a Junior Research Fellowship at Christ's College, Cambridge (2004–2008), and a Leverhulme Early Career Fellowship (2008–2010), Bell was appointed to a Lectureship in the Department of Politics and International Studies (POLIS). He was promoted to a professorship in 2019. He has held visiting positions at Harvard, Darmstadt and the FU Berlin. He is Co-Director of the Cambridge Centre for Political Thought.

In 2021 he was elected a Fellow of the British Academy (FBA).

== Books ==
- The Idea of Greater Britain: Empire and the Future of World Order, 1860–1900 (Princeton University Press, 2007)
- Reordering the World: Essays on Liberalism and Empire (Princeton University Press, 2016)
- Dreamworlds of Race: Empire and the Utopian Destiny of Anglo-America (Princeton University Press, 2020)
- (ed.), Political Theory and Architecture (with Bernardo Zacka). (Bloomsbury, 2020)
- (ed.), Empire, Race, and Global Justice (Cambridge University Press, 2019)
- (ed.), Uncertain Empire: American History and the Idea of the Cold War (with Joel Isaac). (Oxford University Press, 2012)
- (ed.), Ethics and World Politics (Oxford University Press, 2010)
- (ed.), Political Thought and International Relations: Variations on a Realist Theme (Oxford University Press, 2008)
- (ed.), Victorian Visions of Global Order: Empire and International Relations in Nineteenth Century British Political Thought (Cambridge University Press, 2007)
- (ed.), Memory, Trauma, and World Politics: Reflections on the Relationship Between Past and Present (Palgrave Macmillan, 2006)
