= Alan Howard (hedge fund manager) =

British hedge fund manager

- Born: 1964 or 1965 (age 61–62); England
- Education: Hasmonean Grammar School
- Alma mater: Imperial College London
- Occupation: Hedge fund manager
- Known for: Co-founder of Brevan Howard
- Spouses: Sabine Howard (div. 2015) Caroline Byron (m. 2020)
- Children: 6

Alan Howard (born 1964 or 1965) is a British billionaire hedge fund manager and co-founder of Brevan Howard Asset Management LLP. In 2025, the Sunday Times Rich List estimated his net worth as £2.5 billion.

== Early life ==
He was born in England to a Jewish family, Howard attended Hasmonean Grammar School, Hendon London. After graduating from Imperial College London with a master's degree in engineering, he began his financial career at Salomon Brothers and worked in the ECU eurobond market.

== Career ==
Howard served on the New York Federal Reserve's investor advisory committee on financial markets and is one of a group of financial managers, who on occasion, advised New York Federal Reserve officials on economic policy.

In 2019, Howard stepped down as the CEO of Brevan Howard. He was replaced by then chief risk officer, Aron Landy.

In 2020, Howard backed hedge fund One River Digital Asset Management in their purchase of more than $600 million worth of Bitcoin and Ethereum. The fund has commitments that will bring its total holdings of the cryptocurrencies to approximately $1 billion in 2021.

In 2020, Howard was named in the 50 Most Influential (Bloomberg ranking) People Who Changed Global Business.

== Personal life ==
He was married to Sabine Howard, who is French, and they have four children. They divorced in 2015. He married Caroline Byron in January 2020 and they have two children.

In 2010, Howard moved from London to Geneva, Switzerland. Five years later, he purchased a $14.5 million condo in Miami, Florida. In 2017, he returned to London. In December 2025, it was reported that Howard moved back to Switzerland.

Howard has been active in the United Kingdom's Conservative Party circles. Since 2019, he has donated £1.6 million to the party, including a one-off donation of £1 million in the spring of 2023.

Howard founded the Alan Howard Charitable Foundation which until closing in 2010 contributed to charities that focused on Israel, Holocaust education and the homeless. Howard continues to support homeless charities.

In 2014, Howard started The Alan Howard Foundation/JW3 Speaker Series, which is a collection of conversations, talks, and entertainment by leaders and experts in their respective fields. Each event is intended to raise money for the JW3 centre in London.

In December 2019, Reuters reviewed documents of the Cypriot government which show that Howard requested Cypriot citizenship in 2018.

Lady Gaga performed at his wedding to Caroline Byron.

=== Wealth ===
In February 2013, Forbes listed him as one of the 40 highest-earning hedge fund managers. In 2014, he was ranked 53rd on the UK's Sunday Times Rich List. According to Forbes, as of 2019, Howard's net worth is $1.6 billion.
