= List of most popular Android apps =

The following are lists of the top 50 most popular Android apps in the United States according to Similarweb, broken down by top free apps, top paid apps, and top grossing apps.

== Top Free Android Apps ==
App	Publisher	Category	Similarweb top 50 apps ranking (As of September 2026)
Google Chrome	Google LLC	Communication	-
Google Messages	Google LLC	Communication	-
Google	Google LLC	Tools	-
Facebook	Meta Platforms, Inc.	Social	-
Samsung One UI Home	Samsung Electronics Co., Ltd.	Personalization	-
Gmail	Google LLC	Communication	-
YouTube	Google LLC	Video Players & Editors	-
Messenger	Meta Platforms, Inc.	Communication	-
Samsung Clock	Samsung Electronics Co., Ltd.	Tools	-
Instagram	Instagram	Social	-
Google Maps	Google LLC	Travel & Local	-
Amazon Shopping	Amazon Mobile LLC	Shopping	-
Google Play services	Google LLC	Tools	-
Google Photos	Google LLC	Photography	-
TikTok	TikTok Pte. Ltd.	Social	-
Google Phone	Google LLC	Tools	▲1
Samsung Calendar	Samsung Electronics Co., Ltd.	Productivity	▼1
WhatsApp	WhatsApp LLC	Communication	-
Samsung Clock	Google LLC	Tools	-
Cash App	Block, Inc.	Finance	▲1
Samsung Calculator	Samsung Electronics Co., Ltd.	Tools	▼1
Discord	Discord Inc.	Communication	-
Snapchat	Snap Inc	Communication	-
Spotify	Spotify AB	Music & Audio	▲1
Yahoo! Mail	Yahoo	Communication	▼1
YouTube Music	Google LLC	Music & Audio	-
Microsoft Outlook	Microsoft Corporation	Productivity	-
Telegram	Telegram FZ-LLC	Communication	-
Walmart Shopping & Grocery	Walmart	Shopping	▲1
Samsung Internet Browser	Samsung Electronics Co., Ltd.	Communication	▲1
Google Calendar	Google LLC	Productivity	▼2
X (Formerly Twitter)	X Corp.	News & Magazines	-
Reddit	reddit Inc.	Social	-
ChatGPT	OpenAI	Productivity	-
NewsBreak	Particle Media Inc.	News & Magazines	-
Google Calculator	Google LLC	Tools	-
Pinterest	Pinterest	Lifestyle	-
Google Drive	Google LLC	Productivity	-
Temu	Temu	Shopping	-
Life360	Life360	Lifestyle	▲2
Contacts	Google LLC	Communication	▼1
Samsung Notes	Samsung Electronics Co., Ltd.	Productivity	▼1
Moto Camera 3	Motorola Mobility LLC.	Photography	▼1
Google Meet	Google LLC	Communication	▼1
Google Wallet	Google LLC	Finance	▼1
Chase Mobile	JPMorgan Chase	Finance	▼1
Venmo	PayPal Mobile	Finance	▲2
Pixel Camera	Google LLC	Photography	▲3
TextNow	TextNow, Inc.	Communication	▲3
Threads	Instagram	Social	▼2

== Top Paid Android Apps ==
App	Publisher	Category	Similarweb top 50 apps ranking (As of September 2026)
HotSchedules	Fourth Enterprises, LLC	Productivity	-
RadarScope	Telvent DTN, LLC	Weather	-
MyRadar Weather Radar Pro	ACME AtronOmatic LLC	Weather	▲1
Simple Gallery Pro	Simple Mobile Tool	Photography	▼1
NOAA Weather Unofficial (Pro)	Granite Apps	Weather	-
Simple Calendar Pro	Simple Mobile Tool	Productivity	▲1
ReadEra Premium – ebook reader	READERA LLC	Books & Reference	▲5
aCalendar+ Calendar & Tasks	Tapir Apps GmbH	Productivity	▲5
jetAudio+ Hi-Res Music Player	Team Jet	Music & Audio	▼3
TuneIn Radio Pro - Live Radio	TuneIn Inc	Music & Audio	▲4
1DM+: Browser & Video Download	Vicky Bonick	Tools	▼3
TonalEnergy Tuner & Metronome	TonalEnergy, Inc	Music & Audio	▼1
FL Studio Mobile	Image-Line	Music & Audio	▼4
Moon+ Reader Pro	Moon+	Books & Reference	▲3
Tasker	joaomgcd	Tools	-
aWallet Cloud Password Manager	Synpet	Productivity	▼6
Pulsar Music Player Pro	Rhythm Software	Music & Audio	▲10
AppMgr Pro III (App 2 SD)	AZSoft Technology Inc.	Tools	▲4
RadarOmega: Doppler Radar App	SDS Weather INC	Weather	▼1
µTorrent® Pro - Torrent App	bittorrent.com	Video Players & Editors	▲1
RealCalc Plus	Quartic Software	Productivity	▼2
Photo Studio PRO: photo editor	KVADGroup App Studio	Photography	▲6
Threema. The Secure Messenger	Threema AG	Communication	▼7
BlackPlayer EX	FifthSource	Music & Audio	▲1
White Noise	TMSOFT	Health & Fitness	▼1
Flud+	Delphi softwares	Video Players & Editors	▲3
BuzzKill Notification Manager	Sam Ruston	Tools	▼4
PlayerPro Music Player (Pro)	BlastOn SA	Music & Audio	▲2
Business Calendar Pro	Appgenix Software	Productivity	▲3
Music Player Plus	Leopard V7	Music & Audio	▲5
e-Sword: Bible Study to Go	Rick Meyers	Books & Reference	▼11
CalenGoo - Calendar and Tasks	Gunia UG (haftungsbeschränkt)	Productivity	▲1
Easy Voice Recorder Pro	Digipom	Productivity	▼2
DW Contacts & Phone & SMS	DWP	Business	▲8
iReal Pro	Technimo	Music & Audio	▼9
Listen Audiobook Player	acme-android.com	Music & Audio	▲1
Geek Security: Anti Hack & Spy	HiddenEye Apps	Tools	▲6
Torque Pro (OBD 2 & Car)	Ian Hawkins	Communication	▲1
HiPER Calc Pro	HiPER Labs	Tools	▼1
Battery HD Pro	smallte.ch	Tools	▲6
FBReader Premium	FBReader.ORG Limited	Books & Reference	▼1
Camera ZOOM FX Premium	androidslide	Photography	▼8
LED Blinker Notification Light	Mario Ostwald	Personalization	▲1
MiXplorer Silver File Manager	Hootan Parsa	Productivity	▼8
OfficeSuite Pro + PDF	MobiSystems	Business	▲4
ibis Paint	ibis inc.	Art & Design	▲2
MINIMAA: Minimalist Launcher	Bract Studio	Personalization	▲7
Librera PRO - Book reader	Librera	Books & Reference	▼1
1Tap Cleaner Pro (clear cache)	AZSoft Technology Inc.	Tools	▲4
Money Manager (Remove Ads)	Realbyte Inc.	Finance	-

== Top Grossing Android Apps ==
App	Publisher	Category	Similarweb top 50 apps ranking (As of September 2026)
Google One	Google LLC	Productivity	-
TikTok	TikTok Pte. Ltd.	Social	-
ChatGPT	OpenAI	Productivity	-
MONOPOLY GO!	Scopely	Games / Board	-
Amazon Shopping	Amazon Mobile LLC	Shopping	-
Pokémon Go	Scopely Explore, Inc.	Games / Adventure	-
Roblox	Roblox Corporation	Games / Adventure	-
Peacock TV: Stream TV & Movies	Peacock TV LLC	Entertainment	▲1
Spotify	Spotify AB	Music & Audio	▲1
Candy Crush Saga	King	Games / Casual	▼2
Gossip Harbor: Merge & Story	Microfun Limited	Games / Puzzle	▲1
Royal Match	Dream Games, Ltd.	Games / Puzzle	▼1
Crunchyroll	Crunchyroll, LLC	Entertainment	▲1
Coin Master	Moon Active	Games / Casual	▲1
Kingshot	Century Games PTE. LTD.	Games / Strategy	▼2
HBO Max	WarnerMedia Global Digital Services, LLC	Entertainment	-
Paramount+	CBS Interactive, Inc.	Entertainment	-
Evony: The King's Return	TG Inc.	Games / Strategy	▲1
Township	Playrix	Games / Casual	▼1
Whiteout Survival	Century Games PTE. LTD.	Games / Strategy	-
Tinder Dating App: Chat & Date	Tinder LLC	Dating	▲1
Pocket FM	PocketFM	Music & Audio	▼1
Pandora - Music & Podcasts	Pandora	Music & Audio	-
Royal Kingdom	Dream Games, Ltd.	Games / Puzzle	-
Disney+	Disney	Entertainment	▲1
Last War: Survival Game	FUNFLY PTE. LTD.	Games / Strategy	▼1
Life360	Life360	Lifestyle	-
Claude by Anthropic	Anthropic PBC	Productivity	▲2
Grok	SpaceXAI	Productivity	▼1
Toon Blast	Peak	Games / Puzzle	▼1
LinkedIn	LinkedIn	Business	-
Twitch: Live Streaming	Twitch Interactive, Inc.	Entertainment	-
Hinge Dating App: Match & Date	Hinge, Inc.	Dating	▲1
Last Z: Survival Shooter	Omnilojo Pte Ltd	Games / Strategy	▼1
NFL	NFL Enterprises LLC	Sports	▲1
Discord	Discord Inc.	Communication	▼1
Jackpot Party Casino Slots	SciPlay	Games / Casino	▲1
Total Battle: War Strategy	Scorewarrior	Games / Strategy	▼1
Bumble Dating App: Meet & Date	Bumble Holding Limited	Dating	-
Gardenscapes	Playrix	Games / Casual	▲1
Cashman Casino Slots Games	Product Madness	Games / Casino	▼1
Telegram	Telegram FZ-LLC	Communication	-
Snapchat	Snap Inc	Communication	-
CapCut - Video Editor	Bytedance Pte. Ltd.	Video Players & Editors	▲4
Match Factory!	Peak	Games / Puzzle	▼1
Duolingo: Language Lessons	Duolingo	Education	▼1
onX Hunt: Offline Hunting Maps	onXmaps	Sports	▼1
DramaBox - Stream Drama Shorts	STORYMATRIX	Entertainment	▼1
Lightning Link Casino Slots	Product Madness	Games / Casino	▲8
Bingo Blitz™️ - Bingo Games	Playtika Santa Monica	Games / Board	▲6

== See also ==
- List of most-downloaded Google Play applications
- List of most downloaded iOS applications
