= You Bet Your Life =

American radio and television comedy quiz game show

- Logo for the 2021 revival
- Also known as: The Groucho Show (1960–1961)
- Genre: Comedy; Quiz show
- Created by: John Guedel
- Directed by: Robert Dwan; Bernie Smith
- Presented by: Groucho Marx; Buddy Hackett; Bill Cosby; Jay Leno
- Announcer: Jack Slattery; George Fenneman; Ron Husmann; Robbi Chong; Kevin Eubanks
- Composers: Jerry Fielding (1947–1952); Jack Meakin (1952–1961)
- Country of origin: United States
- No. of seasons: 14
- No. of episodes: 529 + 1 unaired

Production
- Producer: John Guedel (1950–1961)
- Production locations: NBC Studios Burbank; Hollywood, CA (1980–1981); WHYY-TV, Philadelphia (1992–1993); Fox Television Center Los Angeles (2021–2023)
- Running time: 24–25 minutes
- Production companies: John Guedel Productions (1950–1961); Otter Creek Productions (2021–2023); Big Dog Productions (2021–2023); Fox First Run (2021-2023)

Original release
- Network: ABC Radio (1947–1949); CBS Radio (1949–1950); NBC Radio (1950–1960); NBC-TV (1950–1961); First-run syndication (1980–1981, 1992–1993, 2021–2023)
- Release: October 27, 1947 – May 26, 2023

You Bet Your Life is an American comedy quiz series that has aired on both radio and television. The original version was hosted by Groucho Marx of the Marx Brothers, with announcer and sidekick George Fenneman. The show debuted on ABC Radio on October 27, 1947, moved to CBS Radio debuting October 5, 1949, and went to NBC-TV and NBC Radio on October 4, 1950. Because of its simple format, it was possible to broadcast the show on both radio and television but not simultaneously. Many of the laughs on the television show were evoked by Groucho's facial reactions and other visual gimmicks, so the two versions were slightly different. The last episode in a radio format aired on June 10, 1960. The series continued on television for another year, recording the last season, beginning on September 22, 1960, with a new title, The Groucho Show.

You Bet Your Life has been revived three times since the original series ended, the most recent being a version hosted by Jay Leno that aired in first-run syndication from 2021 to 2023.

== History ==
During the mid-1940s, Groucho Marx was experiencing a lull in his career; the Marx Brothers had retired from films in 1941 and his radio show Blue Ribbon Town, sponsored by Pabst Blue Ribbon beer, had begun in March 1943 and had failed to catch on. A proposed radio series, The Flotsam Family created for Groucho by screenwriter Irving Brecher was unable to find a sponsor; after the program had been revamped and retitled The Life of Riley starring William Bendix, it became a hit. During this period, Groucho reluctantly returned to the screen in two films with brothers Chico and Harpo Marx, A Night in Casablanca (1946) and Love Happy (1949).

Title card from Groucho Marx era (seen on The Best of Groucho reruns)

During a radio appearance with Bob Hope in March 1947, Marx ad-libbed his annoyance at having to wait in the Green room for 40 minutes before going live on the air. Groucho continued his ad libs for most of the remainder of the program and the audience was in stitches. John Guedel, the producer of Hope program, formed an idea for a quiz show and approached Marx about the subject.

After initial reluctance on Marx's part, Guedel was able to convince him to host the program once Marx realized the quiz would be only a backdrop for his contestant interviews and the storm of ad-libbing that they would elicit. Guedel also convinced Marx to invest in 50% of the show, in part by saying that he was "untouchable" at ad-libbing, but not at following a script.

As Marx and the contestants were ad-libbing, Guedel insisted that each show be filmed and edited before release to remove both the risqué and the less interesting material. The show for the studio audience ran longer than the broadcast version so some parts could be omitted.

On December 28, 1949, episode #49-13 was filmed as a visual test in preparation for the show to be broadcast on television. The president of Film Craft Productions, Regina Lindenbaum (who did the subsequent filming), cited it as the first television show filmed before a live audience. Most television histories incorrectly credit I Love Lucy with that achievement, but Lucy premiered a year after Marx's first filmed season. While filming both shows did indeed allow for greater control in post-production editing, the principal reason they were filmed was so that they could be produced in Hollywood before the advent of the "coaxial cable" that allowed live coast-to-coast broadcasts. They also produced clearer images for the West Coast than the fuzzy kinescope recordings that dominated network programming there in television's early days.

== Gameplay ==
Gameplay on each episode of You Bet Your Life was generally secondary to Marx's comedic interplay with contestants and often with George Fenneman. Contestant teams usually consisted of one male and one female, most of whom were selected from the studio audience. Occasionally, famous or otherwise interesting figures were invited to play (e.g., a Korean-American contestant who was a veteran and had been a prisoner of war during the Korean War), or noteworthy sports figures like Joe Louis, Kenny Washington, Rocky Marciano, Don Drysdale, and Coach Red Sanders, among others.

Each episode began with the introduction "And now, here he is: the one, the only..." by Fenneman, who would pause, inviting the audience to finish the sentence by shouting in unison "GROUCHO!" The show's band would then play a portion of the tune "Hooray for Captain Spaulding", Marx's signature song. Marx next would be introduced to the first two contestants and engage in humorous conversations in which he would improvise his responses or employ prepared lines written by the show's writers after conducting pre-show interviews. In this way, some of Marx's supposed ad-libs were actually written ahead of time. The total number of contestants in each episode varied depending on the length of Marx's conversations and the time taken for gameplay in each segment. Generally, the 30-minute format of the televised show provided time for two or three two-person teams to play in each episode.

Suspense depended on whether a contestant would say the "secret word", a common word revealed to the audience at the outset of each episode. If one of the contestants said the word, a toy duck resembling Marx—with eyeglasses and a mustache—descended from the ceiling to bring a $100 prize. It would then be divided equally between that segment's two-person team. A cartoon of a duck with a cigar was also used in the opening title sequence. The duck was occasionally replaced with various other things, for example a wooden Indian figure, carrying the required $100 prize to the lucky team. In one episode, Groucho's brother, Harpo, came down instead of the duck, and in another a female model attired in a tight bodice and very short skirt came down in a birdcage with the money. In his conversations with contestants, Marx would at times direct their exchanges in ways to increase the likelihood that someone would say the secret word.

In November 1955, Marx announced on the air that he had noticed the success of big-money quiz programs (referring to, but not naming, The $64,000 Challenge) and declared that You Bet Your Life was itself going to raise its "Secret Word" bonus: from $100 to $101. This gimmick lasted until the end of the year.

=== Formats ===
==== Main game ====
After the contestants' introduction and interview, the actual game began. Couples were allowed to choose from a list of 20 available categories before the show; then they tried to answer a series of questions within that category. From 1947 to 1956, couples were asked four questions.

- 1947–1953 – Each couple began with $20, wagering part or all of their bankroll for each question.
- 1953–1954 – Each couple now began with $0, but selected values from $10 to $100 (going up in $10 increments). A correct answer added the value of the question to their bankroll, while an incorrect answer did nothing. According to co-director Robert Dwan in his book As Long As They're Laughing, Guedel changed the scoring format because too many couples were betting, and losing, most or all of their money.
- 1954–1956 – The format was slightly altered to start each couple with $100. Incorrect answers now cut their bankroll to that point in half.
- 1956–1959 – Two couples (reduced from three) answered questions until they either gave two consecutive incorrect responses or answered four consecutive questions correctly for a prize of $1,000.
- 1959–1961 – For the last two seasons, couples picked four questions worth $100, $200, or $300 each, potentially winning up to $1,200. Winning at least $500 qualified the team to go for the jackpot question.

From 1947 to 1956, if a couple ended their quiz with $25 or less, Marx would ask a very easy question so they could receive consolation money of $25 (later $100), which did not count toward the scores. The question was often patently obvious so there was virtually no chance that departing contestants would answer it incorrectly. Some examples include the following: "Who is buried in Grant's Tomb?", "When did the War of 1812 start?", "How long do you cook a three-minute egg?", and "What color is an orange?" The question about Grant's Tomb became such a staple of the show that both Marx and Fenneman were shocked when one man got the question "wrong" by answering "No one". As the contestant then pointed out, Grant's Tomb is an above-ground mausoleum. On another occasion, Marx and Fenneman were dumbfounded when a contestant answered "Me" when asked who was buried in Grant's tomb.

==== Jackpot question ====
In all formats, one of the two players on the team could keep their half of the winnings while the other risked their half. In this case, all amounts being played for were divided in half.

- 1947–1956 – The highest-scoring couple was given one final question for the jackpot, which began at $1,000 and increased by $500 each week until won. In the event of a tie, the tied couples wrote their answers on paper and all couples who answered correctly split the jackpot.
- 1956–1957 – For a brief period following the format change, couples who won the front game could wager half on another question worth $2,000.
- 1957–1959 – Winning couples now faced a wheel with numbers from 1–10, selecting one number for $10,000. If the number selected was spun, a correct answer to the jackpot question augmented the team's total winnings to that amount; otherwise, the question was worth a total of $2,000.
- 1959–1961 – For the last two seasons, the format was slightly altered to eliminate the risk and add a second number for $5,000.

== Nielsen ratings ==
Seasonal Nielsen ratings covered the period between October and April of the following year. The rating number represents the percentage of homes tuned into that program.

Season	Rating/Share	Place
1950–51	36.0	17th
1951–52	42.1	10th
1952–53	41.6	9th
1953–54	43.6	3rd
1954–55	41.0	4th
1955–56	35.4	7th
1956–57	31.1	17th
1957–58	30.6	10th
1958–59	N/A	Below the top 30
1959–60	N/A	Below the top 30
1960–61	N/A	Below the top 30

Nielsen also measured the radio version at tenth among radio shows in 1955.

Despite not being involved with the quiz show scandals, the show's popularity waned and You Bet Your Life fell out of the top 25. NBC stopped making the show in 1961.

== Sponsorship ==
The radio program was sponsored by Allen Gellman, president of Elgin American, maker of watch cases and compacts, during its first two and a half seasons. Later, seasons of the television show (as well as the radio show, after January 1950) were sponsored by Chrysler, with advertisements for DeSoto automobiles incorporated into the opening credits and the show itself. Each show would end with Marx sticking his head through a hole in the DeSoto logo and saying, "Friends...go in to see your DeSoto-Plymouth dealer tomorrow. And when you do, tell 'em Groucho sent you." Still later sponsors included the Toni Company (Prom home permanent, White Rain shampoo) with commercials featuring Harpo and Chico Marx, Lever Brothers (Lux liquid, Wisk detergent), Pharmaceuticals, Inc. (Geritol), and Lorillard Tobacco Co. (Old Gold cigarettes).

In 1953 the show became embroiled in controversy when its musical director, Jerry Fielding, was called to appear before the House Un-American Activities Committee (HUAC) and refused to testify, citing his rights under the Fifth Amendment. The show's sponsor, the DeSoto-Plymouth Dealers of America, demanded that Marx fire Fielding, and he complied. Fielding later accused HUAC of calling him up to testify because they wanted him to name Marx as a Communist sympathizer, and Marx himself later wrote, "That I bowed to sponsors' demands is one of the greatest regrets of my life."

== Contestants ==
The interviews were sometimes so memorable that the contestants became celebrities; "nature boy" health advocate Gypsy Boots, entertainer Pedro Gonzalez-Gonzalez, comedians Phyllis Diller and Ronnie Schell, author Ray Bradbury, virtuoso cellist Ennio Bolognini, blues singer and pianist Gladys Bentley, strongmen Jack LaLanne and Paul Anderson, and actor John Barbour all appeared as contestants while working on the fringes of the entertainment industry.

Harland Sanders, who talked about his "finger-lickin'" recipe for fried chicken that he parlayed into the Kentucky Fried Chicken chain of restaurants, once appeared as a contestant. A guest purporting to be a wealthy Arabian prince was really writer William Peter Blatty; Groucho saw through the disguise, stating, "It was pretty obvious to me that you weren't an Arabian prince; I used to have an Arabian horse and I know what they look like." Blatty won $10,000 and used the money, after quitting his job, to support himself while he focused on establishing a career as a writer. He would later go on to write The Exorcist in 1971. No one in the audience knew the identity of contestant Daws Butler until he began speaking in the voice of cartoon character Huckleberry Hound. He and his partner in the episode went on to win the top prize of $10,000. Cajun politician Dudley J. LeBlanc, a Louisiana state senator and medicine showman, demonstrated his winning style at giving campaign speeches in French, also confessing (in a rare moment of candor) the truth about his signature nostrum, Hadacol: when asked what Hadacol was good for, LeBlanc admitted "about five million dollars for me last year." General Omar Bradley was teamed with an army private, and Marx goaded the private into telling Bradley everything that was wrong with the army. Professional wrestler Wild Red Berry admitted that the outcomes of matches were determined in advance, but that the injuries were real; he revealed a long list of injuries he had sustained.

Other celebrities, already famous, occasionally teamed up with their relatives to win money for themselves or for charities. On February 6, 1958, silent-film star Francis X. Bushman and his wife Iva Millicient Richardson appeared on the show and won $1,000 by successfully answering questions in a geography quiz. Arthur Godfrey's mother Kathryn was a contestant on another episode and held her own with Marx. Edgar Bergen and his then 11-year-old daughter Candice also teamed up with Marx and his daughter Melinda to win $1,000 for the Girl Scouts of the USA, with Fenneman taking on the role of quizmaster for that segment.

Other celebrity guests included Jayne Mansfield, Edith Head, Mickey Walker, Howard Hill, General Clarence A. Shoop, Louise Beavers, Irwin Allen, Frankie Avalon, Lord Buckley, Sammy Cahn, Ray Corrigan, Sam Coslow, Don Drysdale, Kenny Washington, Hoot Gibson, physicist and host of Exploring Albert Hibbs, Tor Johnson, Ward Kimball, Ernie Kovacs, Laura La Plante, Liberace, Joe Louis, Bob Mathias, Irish McCalla, screenwriter and author Mary Eunice McCarthy, Harry Ruby, Max Shulman, Fay Spain, Colonel John Paul Stapp, National Champion Football Coach Red Sanders, John Charles Thomas, Pinky Tomlin, Rocky Marciano and his mother, Charles Goren, and Johnny Weissmuller. In 1961 Marx's brother Harpo appeared to promote his just-published autobiography, Harpo Speaks.

=== Cigar incident ===
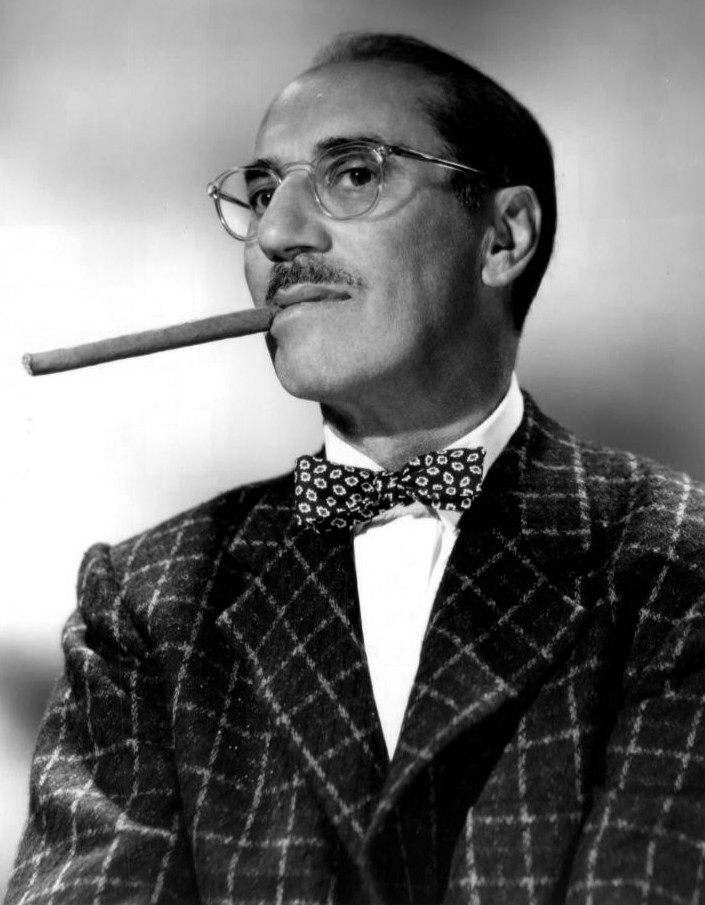
Original host Groucho Marx

The show's most notorious remark supposedly occurred as Marx was interviewing Charlotte Story, who had borne 20 children (the exact number varies in tellings of the urban legend). When Marx asked why she had chosen to raise such a large family, Mrs. Story is said to have replied, "I love my husband"; to which Marx responded, "I love my cigar, but I take it out of my mouth once in awhile." The remark was judged too risqué to be aired, according to the anecdote, and was edited out before broadcast.

Marion and Charlotte Story were indeed parents of 20 children and had appeared as contestants on the radio version of the show in 1950. Audio recordings of the interview exist, and a reference to cigars is made ("With each new kid, do you go around passing out cigars?"), but there is no evidence of the infamous line. Marx and Fenneman both denied that the incident took place. "I get credit all the time for things I never said," Marx told Roger Ebert, in 1972. "You know that line in You Bet Your Life? The guy says he has seventeen kids and I say, 'I smoke a cigar, but I take it out of my mouth occasionally'? I never said that." Marx's 1976 memoir recounts the episode as fact, but co-writer Hector Arce relied mostly on sources other than Marx himself—who was then 85 years old and suffering from cognitive and physical ailments—and was probably unaware that Marx had specifically denied speaking the legendary line. Snopes surmised the line may have been conflated with another exchange with a girl who had 16 siblings; in that episode, Marx asked the girl how her father felt about having 17 children. She replied "my daddy loves children," and Marx responded "Well, I like pancakes, but I haven't got a closet full of them!"

== Success in reruns ==
It was customary practice, established in radio, for a successful network series to take the summer months off and return in the fall. A summer-replacement series, usually a musical or comedy half-hour, would fill the established time slot for 13 weeks until the parent program returned. You Bet Your Life was the first network TV series to continue into the summer months, with reruns of some of the previous season's better episodes. To inform the public that these summer broadcasts were repeats and not new programs, the summer show was titled The Best of Groucho, and 13 reruns were selected each year, beginning in 1952.

Toward the end of You Bet Your Life's network run in 1961, NBC's syndication department was already preparing new versions of the 1954-1961 shows, with all mentions of the original sponsor removed or cropped out of the picture, and a bright light superimposed on Marx's microphone to obscure the NBC call letters. This is why some shots in the syndicated versions appear grainy and less focused. By deleting the sponsor's logo, the image zoomed in on what remained on the screen, sometimes cropping out a contestant while the screen showed only Marx.

Of the 529 filmed half-hours, NBC packaged 250 for syndication. Because the reruns had already been established as The Best of Groucho, the syndicated version took that title, and was an immediate hit: in September 1961 NBC Films announced that 40 major markets had already bought the show, and predicted that more than 150 stations would follow. Most stations opted to air The Best of Groucho on weekdays, five times a week. Stations across America broadcast the show mornings, afternoons, evenings, and late nights. WPIX in New York programmed it at 11:00 p.m., and sponsors bought up all the commercial time before the show was even broadcast.

Gradually the show fell out of fashion, as faster-paced game shows videotaped in color forced the old, leisurely black-and-white show off the air. Stations that had signed contracts for the series in 1961 allowed them to lapse by 1968. Only three cities in America still carried the show: Spokane, Washington (the last time this series was sold to a station — KHQ-TV in July 1967); Great Falls, Montana, and Austin, Texas. The last outpost for The Best of Groucho was Sydney, Australia, where it was last seen in January 1969. The show then faded into memory, until Groucho Marx himself took a hand in its revival.

In 1973, while Marx was hosting a party for show business friends, an employee at an NBC warehouse called and reported that the network was discarding its inventory of You Bet Your Life film prints to make room for newer series. The network was willing to give the reels back to Marx at no cost. Although Marx was uninterested in the physical film prints, those present at the party convinced him to take them so they would not be destroyed. Once the hundreds of film cans arrived, Marx, dismayed at the sheer volume of the library, called John Guedel. Guedel, anxious to see if there was still a market for the show, sold it on a trial basis to Los Angeles television station KTLA for less than $50 for each night. It was programmed at 11:00 p.m., coincidentally following the successful WPIX model when the show was first syndicated. The show became an instant success, prompting Guedel to send the reruns into nationwide syndication almost immediately.

== Legacy ==
Seven months after You Bet Your Life ended its 11-season run at NBC, Marx hosted another game show in prime time, Tell It to Groucho. It aired on CBS during the winter months of 1961 and the spring months of 1962. The game involved each of three celebrity pictures being flashed on a screen, each for a quarter of a second. The couple won $500 for each picture they identified. If the couple could not identify any of the three pictures, they were shown one picture and won $100 for a correct guess. As in You Bet Your Life, the focus of the show was on Marx's interviews with the contestants before they played the game. Replacing George Fenneman were two teenaged sidekicks, Jackson Wheeler and Patti Harmon. Both had appeared on You Bet Your Life as contestants during its final season (Harmon under her given name of Joy Harmon).

You Bet Your Life was parodied on a live April 1955 episode of The Jack Benny Program. Benny pretends to be someone else (Ronald Forsythe) to get on the quiz show (competing with a female contestant played by Irene Tedrow), and continues to divulge information during an effort to say the secret word. In the skit, Benny is unable to answer the final question, which Marx asks with a knowing chuckle, simply because it asks his real age; as part of his comic persona, Benny would never give his age voluntarily, even for something he valued as much as money. After the sketch Marx asked him why he opted out of the $3,000 prize. Benny then gave away his age, indirectly, by saying "Where else could I buy 22 years for three thousand dollars?" After Marx's death this film appeared in the Unknown Marx Brothers documentary on DVD. A brief clip of the episode appeared in the 2009 PBS special Make 'Em Laugh: The Funny Business of America.

A British version of the show aired on Southern Television in 1981 called Under Manning, hosted by Bernard Manning.

The title of the show was parodied in the 1989 UHF, on the U62 Fall Schedule as You Bet Your Pink Slip.

A Bugs Bunny cartoon entitled Wideo Wabbit has a scene in which Bugs impersonates Marx to Elmer Fudd for the game show You Beat Your Wife, a takeoff on the name You Bet Your Life.

An episode of Animaniacs hs a segment called "You Risk Your Life" where, if a contestant says the secret word, Wakko would hit that contestant on the head with a mallet. The contestants were Mrs. Myra Puntridge and Aristotle. The secret word is "yes," and Aristotle says it three times.

An episode of In Living Color had a skit called "You Bet Your Career". Jamie Foxx plays Bill Cosby, and it features washed-up celebrities competing for a walk-on role in sitcoms.

== Revivals ==
=== 1980–1981: Buddy Hackett ===
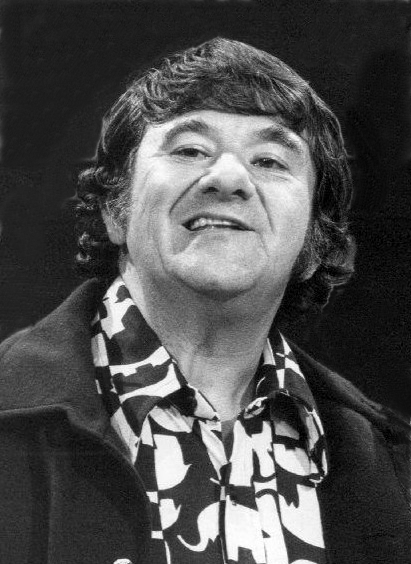
Buddy Hackett, host of 1980–81 version

In 1980, Buddy Hackett hosted a new version produced by Hill-Eubanks Productions, and syndicated by MCA, who licensed the format and IP from NBC. Fenneman's announcer/sidekick role was taken over by nightclub entertainer Ron Husmann.

The show would begin with Hackett performing a brief stand up routine followed by a brief chat with Husmann. Three individual contestants appeared on each episode, one at a time. The contestants were interviewed by Hackett and then played a true or false quiz of five questions in a particular category. The first correct answer to a question earned $25, and the amount doubled with each subsequent correct answer. After the fifth question, the contestant could opt to try to correctly answer a sixth question to triple their winnings; however, if the contestant was incorrect, their earnings were cut in half. Additionally, the secret word was still worth $100, and if anyone said it, each contestant on that episode won $100.

The contestant with the most money returned at the end of the show to meet "Leonard", the prize duck (If there was a tie, they would be asked a question with a numeric answer, which they wrote down, and whoever was closest without going over won). The contestant then stopped a rotating device, causing a plastic egg to drop out which concealed the name of a bonus prize, one of which was a car.

Some episodes had celebrities, including George Fenneman, Phil Harris, and Greg Evigan appear as contestants; each played for a member of the studio audience.

=== 1992–1993: Bill Cosby ===
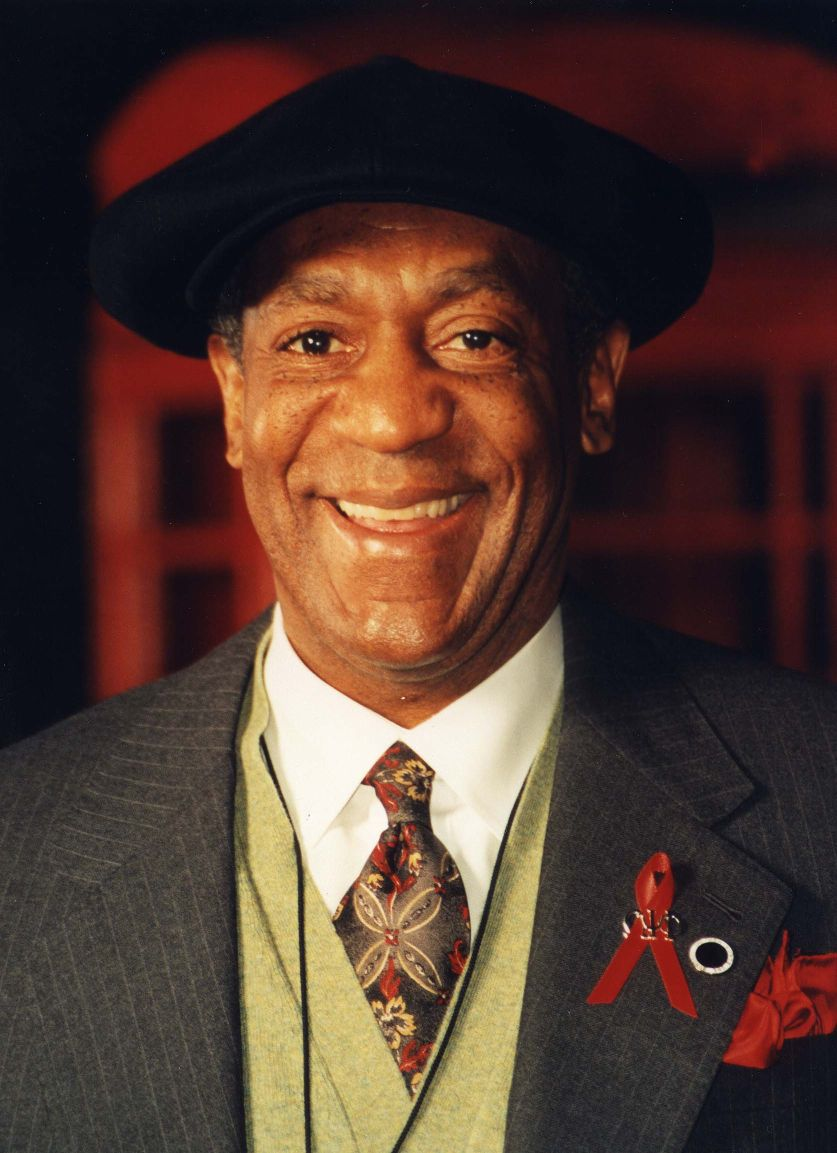
Bill Cosby, host of 1992–93 version

Another version hosted by Bill Cosby aired from September 7, 1992, to June 4, 1993 (with repeats airing until September 3 of that year), in syndication. Carsey-Werner syndicated the series, the first show they distributed themselves. Carsey-Werner had bought out the IP and format of the series from NBC in 1991. Cosby was joined on this show by a female announcer and sidekick, Robbi Chong, who was referred to as "Renfield". Organist Shirley Scott contributed the jazzy theme music, and the program was taped in Philadelphia at the studios of public television station WHYY-TV.

Three couples competed, with each couple playing the game individually. After the couple was introduced, they spent time talking with Cosby. When the interview was done, the game began. Each couple was staked with $750 and were then asked three questions within a category presented at the start of the game. Before each question, the couple made a wager, which would be added to their winnings if they were correct or subtracted if they were incorrect. The secret word in this version, worth $500, was delivered by a stuffed toy black goose dressed in a sweatshirt from Temple University, Cosby's alma mater. If one couple said it, a new word was chosen when the next couple was introduced.

The couple with the most money (independent of any secret word bonuses) advanced to the bonus round, in which they were asked one last question in the same category they had previously played. A correct answer won a choice of three cards, which at different times were all attached to the goose or laid out on a table. Two of the cards displayed the goose's face and would double the couple's money, while the third awarded an additional $10,000.

As the 1992–93 season progressed, many stations carrying the show either moved it to overnight time slots or dropped it entirely due to low ratings.

=== 2021–2023: Jay Leno ===
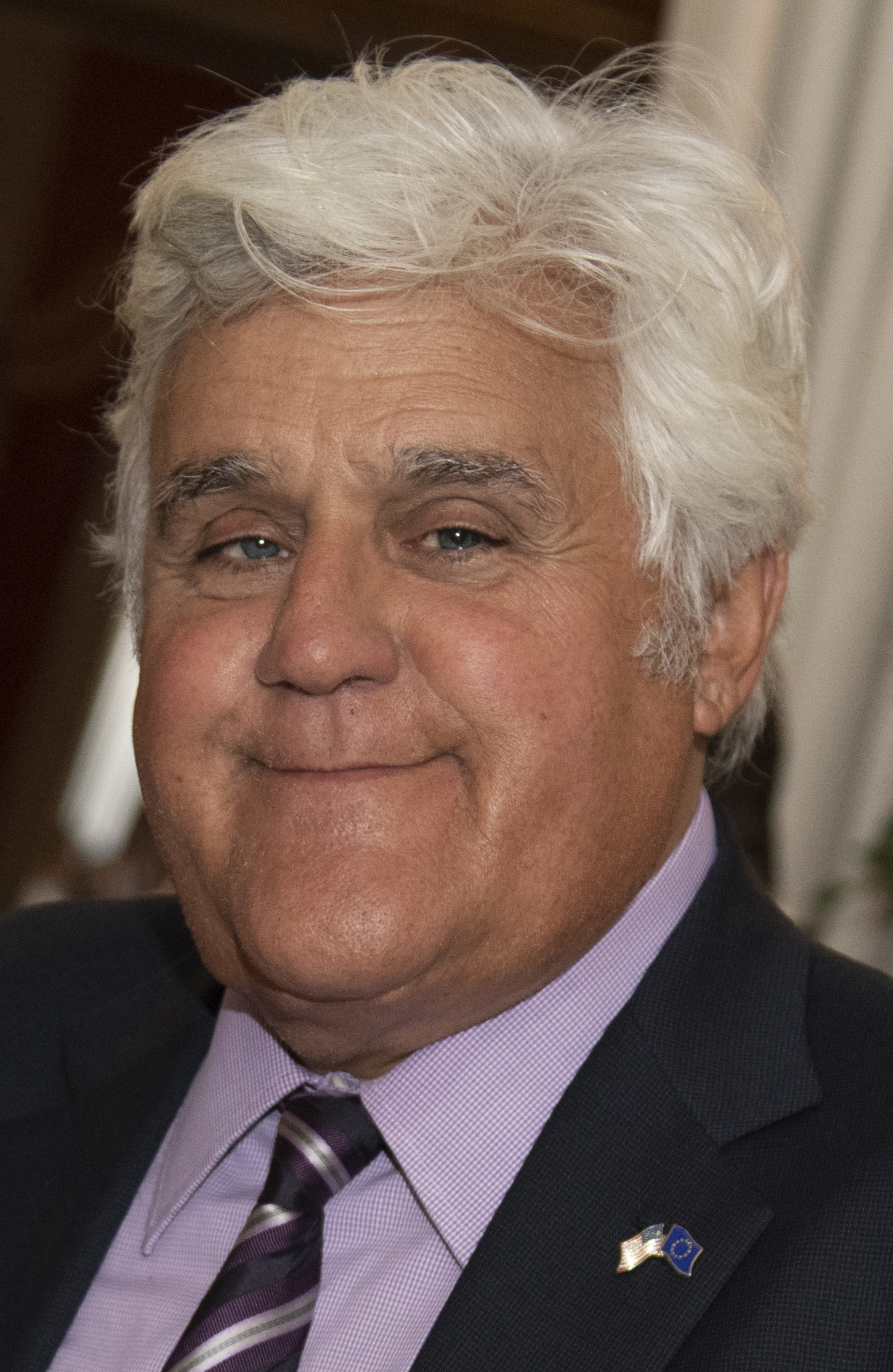
Jay Leno, host of 2021–23 version

In September 2020, it was announced that Fox First Run would reboot the show in syndication, which premiered on September 13, 2021, with Jay Leno as host. Carsey-Werner's Tom Werner will return as executive producer. It was stated that the revival would also include bits carried over from Leno's tenure on The Tonight Show and The Jay Leno Show, such as Headlines, and that Kevin Eubanks, who had been Leno's bandleader on The Tonight Show from 1995 to 2009 and for a brief time in 2010, and The Jay Leno Show (as the Primetime band) and comic foil for much of his run on The Tonight Show, would serve as sidekick; Leno plans on avoiding any political or topical humor to keep the show evergreen.

In this format, two teams of two contestants per show answer four questions in one category; some are multiple-choice, while others are open-ended. The first question is worth $250, and the value increases by $250 per question to a maximum of $1,000. After the fourth question, each member of the team may either end the game and keep their share of the winnings, or play a fifth question; a correct answer doubles their total, while a miss forfeits it. The secret word (sponsored by CarGurus in the first season and Bingo Blitz and Slotomania in the second season), awards a $500 bonus as in the 1992-93 revival. Starting in the second season, if the contestants answer a random question correctly, a follow-up bonus question was asked where if answered correctly, the contestants are awarded a $1,000 bonus. A team can win up to $6,500 by answering all five questions correctly, answering the bonus question correctly, and saying the secret word. If time permits at the end of an episode, one audience member is asked a question and can win a prize for giving the correct answer.

The opening comedy segments, including Headlines, were removed at the end of the first season; starting with the second season, the program begins with Leno chatting with first set of contestants.

Production of a planned third season was suspended after Writers Guild of America members went on strike in May 2023, as Leno refused to cross the picket line in solidarity. Instead of continuing to air reruns into the 2023–24 season, stations that carried the program replaced it with other syndicated fare in the interim, with Fox First Run offering two other syndicated game shows, Person, Place or Thing (which entered national syndication that season following a six-week test run in the Summer of 2022 on selected Fox-owned stations) and Who the Bleep Is That (which was alternately offered to selected Fox O&Os as a substitute, following an initial six-week test run on Fox O&Os the previous Spring), to fill its vacated timeslots. As a result of the strike, the show was cancelled in August 2023.

== Episode status ==
Most of the episodes still exist, with 1954–61 episodes syndicated by NBC as The Best Of Groucho. Also existing is the unaired pilot episode (TV version), which was produced for CBS on December 5, 1949. A handful of audio recordings from the radio show also exist dating as far back as 1947, as do a number of one-hour, uncut audio recordings, which were edited to create the radio version, mostly from spring 1949 and fall 1953.

Unlike most pre-1973 NBC in-house productions, it was not part of the package of series sold to National Telefilm Associates. Producer John Guedel explained why the You Bet Your Life shows were excluded: "They were slow and in black-and-white and old-fashioned. When NBC sold its library to NTA and went out of the syndication business, NTA had no interest in Groucho." Marx's grandson, Andy Marx, confirmed the story.

With Guedel having "made a royalty deal with NBC to syndicate" the old shows himself, NBC still held ancillary rights of this version, thus distribution began with NBC Enterprises from 2001 to 2004. Since September 2004, NBCUniversal Syndication Studios handles syndication rights to the Marx (non-public domain) and Hackett versions.

In the United States, public domain and official releases were distributed on home video by the following companies:

- NBC Home Video (1984–85)
- Ambrose Video (1988–98)
- Brentwood Home Video (1998–2001)
- Alpha Video Classics (2001–11)
- Goodtimes DVD (2000–02)
- Passion Productions (2005–present)
- Brentwood Communications (2005–08)
- BCI Navarre (2011–present)

Additionally, two official DVD compilations were released by Shout! Factory and Sony Music Entertainment; the first was You Bet Your Life: The Lost Episodes, released in 2003, which contained 18 classic episodes not seen since the original broadcasts (many from network prints, as originally broadcast by NBC with sponsor mentions intact) as well as numerous bonus features, including outtakes, a behind-the-scenes piece, and rare audio clips. A second release, You Bet Your Life: The Best Episodes, followed in 2004 and included another assortment of 18 original episodes, as well as three game show pilots featuring Marx among its bonus features. Both of the DVD presentations in both of SHOUT! Factory/Sony Music Entertainment's DVD releases of Groucho Marx’s You Bet Your Life were presented uncut and unedited, remastered and restored from the original kinescopes and in its original NBC broadcast presentation.

The Carsey-Werner Company owns the Cosby version, as it produced that revival with Cosby.
