= Appcharge =

Mobile gaming company based in Israel

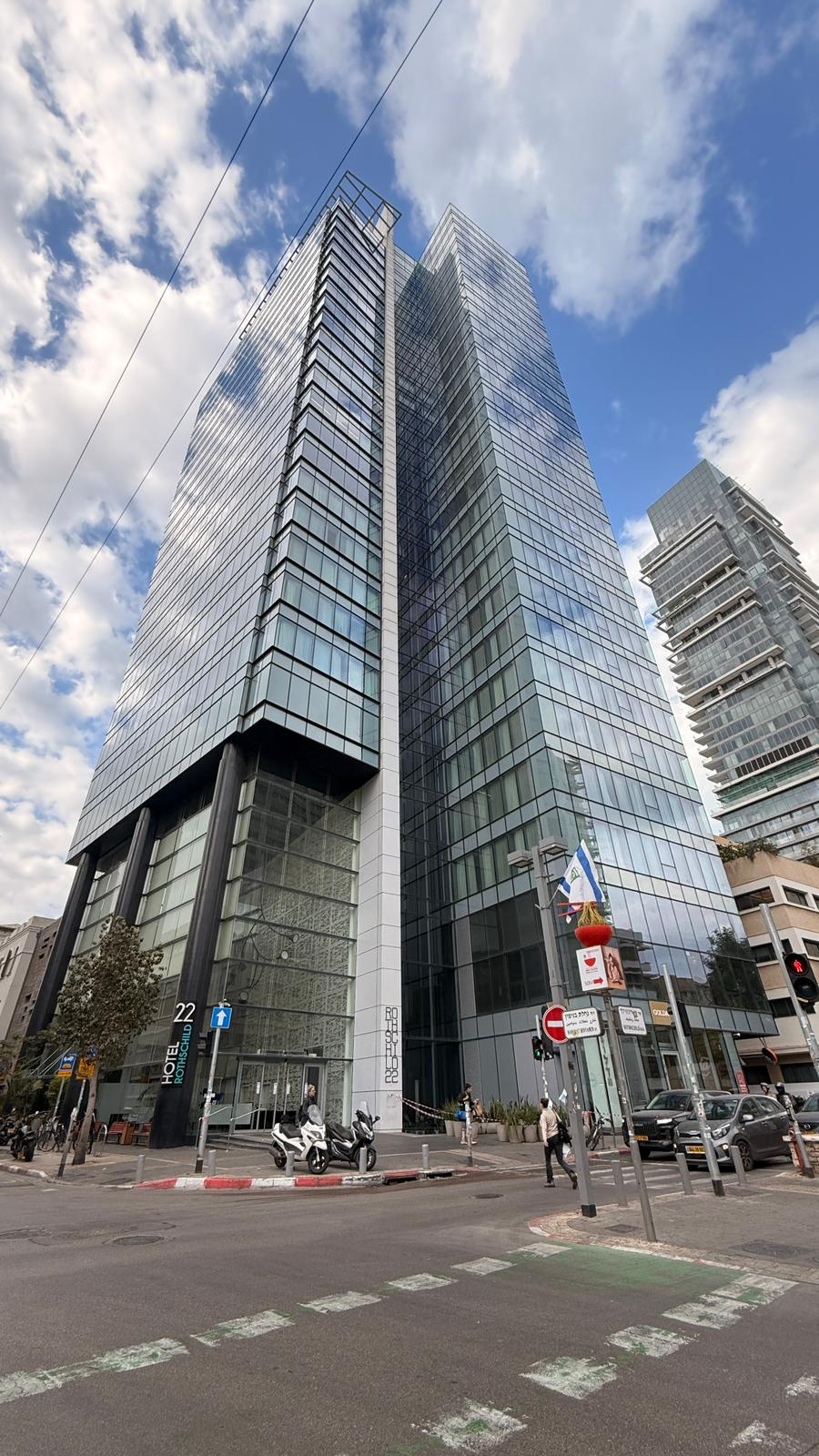
- Appcharge headquarters at Tel Aviv, Israel in 2026
- Type: Private
- Industry: Mobile gaming
- Founded: 2022
- Founder: Maor Sason and Roei Barassi
- Headquarters: Tel Aviv, Israel
- Products: Direct-to-consumer (DTC) platforms for mobile game publishers
- Number of employees: 140
- Website: appcharge.com

Appcharge is a global payment and commerce platform for mobile game publishers, headquartered in Tel Aviv, Israel, with offices in Helsinki, London, Seoul, California, Beijing, and Istanbul. The company provides software and APIs that allow publishers to operate direct-to-consumer (DTC) storefronts and alternative in-app billing. Appcharge reports serving more than 150 games and processing in excess of US$1 billion in DTC transactions each year.

== History ==
Appcharge was founded in 2022 by Maor Sason and Roei Barassi. Sason previously sold the mobile gaming ad company Appush to Israeli software pioneer Magic Software Enterprise.

Appcharge's expansion in 2024 was supported by Creandum, Play Ventures, Bitkraft, Supercell, Glilot Capital Partners, IVP, and other companies.

In August 2025, Appcharge, which by then was employing over 100 people, raised $58 million in a Series B funding round led by IVP, with participation from Playrix, Smilegate Ventures, and all previous investors. This brought the total amount of Appcharge's historical financial backing to $89 million.

== Overview ==
Appcharge develops software and infrastructure that allow mobile game publishers to operate direct-to-consumer (DTC) commerce outside traditional app-store billing systems. The platform includes tools for web-based storefronts and alternative billing for in-app purchase flows that bypass default payment providers.

Following U.S. court rulings in May 2025 requiring Apple to permit external billing, developers gained the ability to use third-party payments for iOS in-app transactions. After Google expanded support for third-party billing and external payment flows on Android, Appcharge introduced Android Payment Links, which mirrors this functionality for Android developers. The company's checkout SDK is also used by Android games distributed through sideloading or alternative app stores.

== See also ==
- Moon Active
- Playtika
