= Distrust (video game) =

2017 survival video game

- Developer: Cheerdealers
- Publisher: Alawar
- Engine: Unity
- Platforms: Microsoft Windows; Xbox One; PlayStation 4; iOS; Nintendo Switch
- Release: Microsoft Windows: WW: August 23, 2017; Xbox One: WW: August 24, 2018; PlayStation 4: WW: November 15, 2018; iOS: WW: February 18, 2019; Nintendo Switch: WW: July 16, 2019
- Genres: Strategy, survival
- Modes: Single-player, multiplayer

Distrust is a survival game developed by Cheerdealers and published by Alawar. The player controls a team who, after surviving a helicopter crash at an arctic base, must scrounge for supplies. It is available for Microsoft Windows, Xbox One, PlayStation 4, iOS, and Nintendo Switch.

== Gameplay ==
The gameplay is inspired by The Thing, a 1982 horror film by John Carpenter. After a helicopter crash, the survivors take refuge at an abandoned arctic base. Initially, players choose two out of a roster of three characters. The roster can be expanded by unlocking up to fifteen characters, each of whom have special abilities to aid in their survival. The base's map is randomly generated. While scrounging for supplies, the characters must satisfy basic needs: sleep, heat, and hunger. Sleeping risks drawing the attention of aliens known as "anomalies", which can kill characters or set back progress. Failure to satisfy their needs can cause madness, which brings on random status effects, such as quoting Shakespeare or consuming more food. After solving a randomized puzzle, players unlock a new zone, and another random map is generated. The game concludes once six zones have been completed.

== Release ==
Distrust was released for Microsoft Windows on August 23, 2017.

== Reception ==
On Metacritic, the PC version of Distrust has a rating of 75/100 based on five reviews, indicating "generally favorable reviews". Leif Johnson of GameSpot rated it 7/10 stars and wrote that the game's roguelike gameplay, which depends heavily on random chance, keeps replays fresh. However, he said this randomization can also make it "maddeningly tough". Ted Hentschke of Dread Central rated it 2.5/5 stars, criticizing how little inspiration the game took from The Thing, its trivially-overcome challenges, and the pointlessness of many of the randomized gameplay elements. Reviewing the game for Bloody Disgusting, Jim Hargreaves rated it 3/5 stars and wrote that the game's unpredictability and rushed micromanagement may frustrate some players, who find themselves overwhelmed. In comparing it to Don't Starve, Alec Meer of Rock, Paper, Shotgun called it "a neat and tense survive 'em up".
