= They Always Run =

- Developer(s): Alawar
- Publisher(s): PID Games (console)
- Platform(s): Windows, PlayStation 4, Xbox One, Switch
- Release: Windows: WW: October 20, 2021; PS4, XOne, Switch: WW: May 19, 2022
- Genre(s): Platform
- Mode(s): Single-player

They Always Run is a platformer video game by Alawar. It was released for Windows by PID Games in 2021 and published for console in 2022. Described by the developer as a "story-driven action scroller", the game is a science-fiction and Western themed action-platformer. The player is Aiden, a three-armed bounty hunter tasked to take down bounties across linear two-dimensional stages.

Upon release, They Always Run received average reviews, with critics praising the detail in the game's visual presentation and animation and combat mechanics, whilst raising mixed views on the controls and integration of the use of the player's third arm in and outside of combat sections of the game.

== Gameplay ==
Gameplay in They Always Run involves locating and defeating bounties in two-dimensional linear stages.

Players progress through linear stages, running, jumping and climbing across platforms and vaulting over obstacles. Combat is engaged with a three-hit combo, parry and dodge. The player also has a third arm providing a special directional attack that can break enemy shields or holds and shoot weapons. Use of the arm is limited to charges that are built from the player successfully parrying enemy attacks. Players have a health system that is replenished with stimpacks, which can be found throughout levels and saved in finite amounts. As a bounty hunter, players can activate a radar that alerts them to the presence of a bounty, usually a stronger enemy, which provides rewards when defeated. Players can approach the collection of the bounties in several ways, including attempting to capture the bounty alive at greater difficulty or killing the target for a reduced bounty. Rewards and collection of upgrades scattered throughout the level allow the player to increase their health level, powers usable by the third arm, and slots for healing items.

== Plot ==
Aidan is a three-armed bounty hunter who travels across interstellar planets to collect bounties on the most dangerous criminals in the galaxy. Becoming involved in a conspiracy that concerns his past, Aidan and his partner John takes on a series of bounties to uncover the truth.

== Development ==
They Always Run was created by Russian developer Alawar, with a team of between 10 and 13 staff that had worked on previous titles including Distrust and I Am Not A Monster: First Contact. The studio created a contest to propose and bid on pitches and prototypes for production from staff, with They Always Run derived from designer Artemy Naimushin's winning proposal to create "a game about a space hunter". Producer and lead artist Stepan Komarov stated that the development team aimed to create a unique and picturesque visual style based on the "classical art education" of its art team, adopting a labor-intensive approach to frame-by-frame animation inspired by cartoon animation. The space western science-fiction tone of the game was inspired by television series including Firefly and Cowboy Bebop, seeking to capture "the feeling of a space adventure with a team on a ship". They Always Run was announced by the studio on April 12, 2021, and was showcased at the E3 PC Gaming Show. The game was released on October 20, 2021, for Windows, with a port for the PlayStation 4, Xbox One, Switch published by PID Games on May 19, 2022.

== Reception ==
Reception

Aggregate score
Aggregator	Score
Metacritic	73%

Review scores
Publication	Score
Eurogamer	8/10
NME	4/5 stars
Vandal	7.5/10

They Always Run received "average" reviews, according to review aggregator Metacritic. The Verge cited the game as one of the best titles from the 2021 E3 PC Gaming Show.

Reviewers were generally positive about the game's combat and gameplay. NME described the combat as "immediately endearing" in its simplicity due to the "casual looseness to its hit-boxes" and the use of the third arm as an integral combat mechanic, although expressed disappointment the arm was not integrated into platforming. PC Gamer enjoyed the "relative simplicity" of combat and noted the third arm offered slightly more gameplay variety, but "expected more" from the mechanic and found its controls "awkward and noodly". Vandal faulted the game's controls, citing the "lack of fluidity" to combat and the "crude and unrewarding" skill progression system, and the lack of prominence of using the third arm in combat.

Critics praised the visual presentation and animation of the game. NME noted the quality and convincing detail of the game's animation and its use of parallax layering and dynamic lighting. Rock Paper Shotgun highlighted the "painterly detail" of "handcrafted" environments and "incredibly satisfying" player animations. Describing the game as "good-looking", PC Gamer also commended the "stylish" animation and the "love for detail" in its backgrounds. Vandal wrote that the game's "unusual" and "comic" appearance was "magnificent" and stood out compared to other games, highlighting the game's lighting system and "exuberant" animations.

Reviewers of They Always Run were also generally positive about the narrative and writing. Rock Paper Shotgun commended the game's "brilliant pacing" and incremental structure of levels that each progress to a "larger, overarching story", highlighting the dialogue as "endearing" and "lighter-hearted". NME characterized the expansiveness of the plot and the "gleeful abandon" on its pace, highlighting the writing as "genuinely pretty funny". PC Gamer found the game's use of "hard-boiled" Western tropes to be humorous in their over-reliance on genre stereotypes. Vandal expressed that the game did not have particularly good writing nor an interesting story, but provided greater structure to the game.
