= Youda Games =

Dutch gaming developer

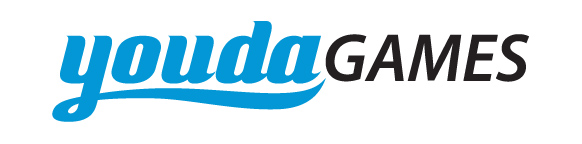
- Industry: Video games
- Founded: 2002; 24 years ago
- Headquarters: Amsterdam, Netherlands
- Products: Online games, Mobile games
- Website: youdagames.com

Youda Games is a Dutch video-game studio and publisher focused on creating casual time management and strategy games. The company has been developing games since 2002, but has remained largely dormant since 2016.

Youda Games primarily released their games on PC, Mac and Mobile devices, whilst also providing Flash-based online games and demos through their own online game portal and Facebook. Third-party games were also hosted on their website for users to play, similarly to other casual gaming companies at the time like Miniclip or Big Fish Games.

In 2023, Azerion announced an agreement to sell their ownership of the Youda Games portfolio to Playtika for between $89.4 million and $165 million, which was completed in the following weeks. As of 2024, the company still maintains the Governor of Poker games originally developed by Youda.

== Games ==
=== Governor of Poker ===
Governor of Poker is a series of wild west-themed poker games developed by Youda Games, first released on PC in 2009. Each game is set in Texas where poker has been outlawed, and the player must work their way through a number of towns and compete in tournaments to become the new governor and restore the card game to its former glory. Players can spend their earnings to purchase real estate in each town and build their reputation.

The game received a sequel in 2010, and a third game was announced in 2014. A version of the game for Facebook, titled Governor of Poker: Texas Tycoon and featuring online play between friends, was also available.

In 2014, Polish studio Teyon ported the original game to the Nintendo 3DS eShop; however, the title has since been delisted. This version of the game received negative reviews from critics, who found the core gameplay tedious and poorly optimized for the system.

=== Youda Farmer ===
Youda Farmer is a tycoon-styled simulation game first released for PC on February 26, 2009. The player runs a farm in which they must collect different kinds of produce, as dictated by tickets which are displayed at the bottom of the screen. The player is given a set number of items to collect for each level, as well as a minimum amount of items that must be collected to pass. Once a ticket appears, the player can click on it to drive their truck to that part of the farm and then drag their produce into crates for pickup. Tickets start to count down after appearing, requiring the player to manage their time effectively and choose which orders to prioritise. If the player reaches their collection target, they will then drive into the town to deliver their produce to various store vendors who in turn provide payment and may process some items into meals or goods. Upgrades to the truck and farm can be purchased between levels, unlocking new kinds of produce or increasing the efficiency of the farm.

A sequel, titled Youda Farmer 2: Save the Village, released on November 7, 2010. A third game, Youda Farmer 3: Seasons, released on June 22, 2011. The game was ported to Nintendo DS by Purple Hills.

=== Youda Survivor ===
Youda Survivor is a survival simulation game first released for PC in 2010. The player is a castaway who has washed up on a tropical island and must collect various resources to survive each day. The player starts each level by digging holes into the sand, which fills with water from the rain and in turn attracts seagulls which drop eggs. The player must also maintain their water and health meters in order to survive, which can drain due to the weather or taking damage from enemies. Each level contains a resource goal which must be met to progress, sometimes requiring items to be further refined. Players can upgrade the facilities on their island between levels, such new shovels to improve digging speeds or a better storeroom to increase the amount of items that can be held. Resources can also be used as ingredients to create potions to further assist in gameplay.

A sequel, Youda Survivor 2, released in 2011. Both games were published on mobile by G5 Entertainment.

List of games developed by Youda Games
Game	Year	Genre	Platforms
Rails of War	2007	Strategy	Windows
Skies of War	2007	Strategy	Windows
Kindergarten	2008	Strategy	Windows, Mac
Baby Blimp	2008	Simulation	Windows
Youda Camper	2008	Simulation	Windows, Mac, iOS, Android
Youda Farmer	2009	Simulation	Windows, Mac, iOS, Android, Nintendo DS
Governor of Poker	2009	Card	Windows, Mac, iOS, Android, Nintendo 3DS
Youda Marina	2009	Simulation	Windows, Mac, iOS, Android
Youda Legend: The Curse of the Amsterdam Diamond	2009	Hidden object	Windows, Mac, iOS, Android, Nintendo DS
Youda Sushi Chef	2009	Simulation	Windows, Mac, iOS, Android
Youda Legend: The Golden Bird of Paradise	2010	Hidden object	Windows, Mac, iOS, Android, Nintendo DS
Youda Fairy	2010	Action	Windows, Mac, iOS, Android
Youda Safari	2010	Simulation	Windows, Mac, iOS, Android, Nintendo DS
Governor of Poker 2	2010	Card	Windows, iOS, Android
Youda Survivor	2010	Survival	Windows, Mac, iOS, Android
Youda Farmer 2: Save the Village	2010	Simulation	Windows, Mac, iOS, Android
Youda Survivor 2	2011	Survival	Windows, Mac, iOS, Android
Youda Farmer 3: Seasons	2011	Simulation	Windows, Mac, iOS, Android
Youda Fisherman	2011	Simulation	Windows, Mac, iOS, Android
Youda Mystery: The Stanwick Legacy	2011	Point-and-click	Windows, Mac, iOS, Android
Youda Beaver	2011	Simulation	iOS, Android
Youda Jewel Shop	2012	Simulation	Windows, Mac, iOS, Android
Legacy Tales: Mercy of the Shadows	2013	Point-and-click	Windows, Mac, iOS, Android
Lost Oddies	2014	Puzzle	iOS, Android
Youda Sushi Chef 2	2014	Simulation	Windows, Mac, iOS, Android
Texas Hold'Em Poker Pro	2014	Card	iOS, Android
Stratego	2015	Strategy	iOS, Android
Governor of Poker 3	2016	Card	Windows, iOS, Android
