= Alawar =

Russian video game company

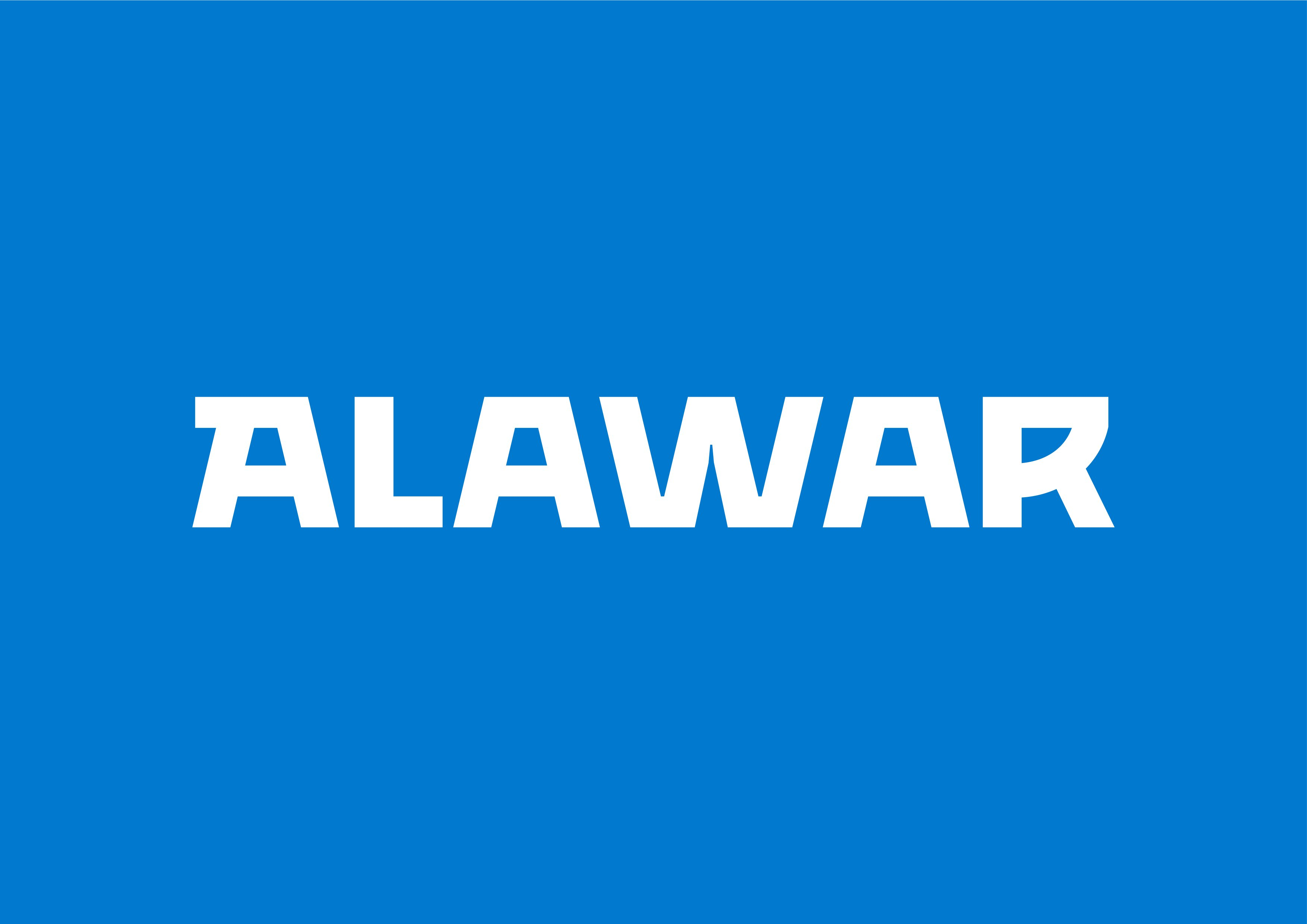
- Type: Private
- Industry: Video games
- Founded: 1999; 27 years ago in Novosibirsk, Russia
- Founders: Sergey Zanin; Alexander Lyskovsky
- Headquarters: Lewes, Delaware, U.S.
- Area served: Worldwide
- Key people: Sergey Zanin (CEO)
- Number of employees: 50+ (2021)
- Website: company.alawar.com

Alawar Entertainment is a Russian international developer and publisher of video games. Founded in Novosibirsk, Russia, it is based in Lewes, Delaware, United States. Its main areas of activity are free-to-play games. The company's games have sold more than 200 million copies.

== History ==
The company was founded in 1999 by Novosibirsk State University students Alexander Lyskovsky and Sergey Zanin. Game development was the first department of the company. Alawar released two games: Puzzle Rally and Bubble Bobble Nostalgie.

In 2001, the company released Magic Ball, a 3D Arkanoid-style game developed by Dream Dale in Irkutsk. Magic Ball was ported to PlayStation consoles and iOS. In 2006, Alawar became one of the first companies to support SMS payments in Russia for its products.

In 2008, the first games in the Farm Frenzy and The Treasures of Montezuma franchises were released. In August 2009, Alawar and Oleg Kuvaev signed a cooperation agreement that gave Alawar exclusive rights to use the Masyanya brand in games until 2014. In 2010, Alawar released around 15 projects for the iPhone and iPad. The Treasures of Montezuma was released on iOS.

In 2019, Alawar developed and published the free-to-play battle royale shooter Watchers (servers shut down in August 2021), as well as Space Robinson, an action game with rogue-like elements. In 2021, Alawar published a 2D narrative detective Song of Farca. Later this year, the company released a 2D action platformer They Always Run by its own production.

In 2022, Alawar released the third chapter of the Beholder saga. In April, the company announced the development of Necrosmith, a rogue-like Necromancer simulator that was released on 13 July 2022 and has sold over 200,000 copies on Steam. On 6 March 2023, Alawar announced the development of Necrosmith 2. On 5 April 2023, Wall World, a mining and tower defense game by Alawar, was released on Steam and sold 200,000 copies in 2 months.

Alawar has a distribution network through its website and affiliate program. On June 1, 2023, Alawar closed its game storefronts.

== Awards ==
- 2008 – Farm Frenzy was named the best casual game at the 2008 Game Developers Conference
- 2008 – Alawar won the Runet Prize 2008
- 2012 – Alawar was named best publisher at the Game Developers Conference
- 2016 – Beholder won the Excellence in Game Design and Best Indie Game categories at the DevGamm Independent Games Conference
- 2017 – Do Not Feed The Monkeys received several awards: Best Narrative (DevGamm Conference, Minsk), Most Innovative (3DWire, Segovia), Best Indie Game (FEFFS, Strasbourg), DevGamm Choice (Get It! Conference, Odessa), Media Choice (Indiecade Europe, Paris)
- 2019 – Do Not Feed The Monkeys was a finalist at the Independent Games Festival (IGF) in several categories: Innovative Game, Best Design and Grand Prix
- 2023 – Beholder 3 won the Best Serious Game category at the German Computer Games Awards 2023.

== Games developed ==
Year	Title	Platform(s)
2016	Beholder	Microsoft Windows, Linux, macOS, PlayStation 4, Xbox One, Nintendo Switch, iOS, Android
2017	Distrust	Microsoft Windows, macOS, PlayStation 4, Xbox One, Nintendo Switch
2017	Beholder – Blissful Sleep	Microsoft Windows, Linux, macOS, PlayStation 4, Xbox One, Nintendo Switch, iOS, Android
2018	I am not a Monster: First Contact	Microsoft Windows
2018	Beholder 2	Microsoft Windows, Linux, macOS, PlayStation 4, Xbox One, Nintendo Switch, iOS, Android
2021	They Always Run	Microsoft Windows
2022	Necrosmith	Microsoft Windows, Nintendo Switch
2023	Wall World	Microsoft Windows
2024	Necrosmith 2	Microsoft Windows
2025	Beholder - Conductor	Microsoft Windows
2026	The Last Gas Station	Microsoft Windows
TBA	Wall World: Deep Threat	Microsoft Windows
TBA	Richat Structure	Microsoft Windows

== Games published ==
Year	Title	Developer(s)	Platform(s)
2004	Roads of Fantasy	Gamemaster's Group	Microsoft Windows
2007	Turtix	In Images	Microsoft Windows, macOS
2017	Displaced	Gamexy	Microsoft Windows, macOS
2018	Do Not Feed the Monkeys	Fictiorama Studios, BadLand Games Publishing	Microsoft Windows, Linux, macOS, PlayStation 4, Xbox One, Nintendo Switch, iOS, Android
2019	Space Robinson	Luxorix Games	Microsoft Windows, Linux, macOS
2021	Song of Farca	Wooden Monkeys	Microsoft Windows, Linux, macOS
2021	A Tale for Anna	Far Mills	Microsoft Windows, macOS
2021	Looking for Aliens	Yustas Games Studio	Microsoft Windows
2022	Beholder 3	Paintbucket Games	Microsoft Windows
2024	Technotopia	Yustas	Microsoft Windows
2024	Kingsgrave	Egg or Chicken Games	Microsoft Windows, Xbox One, Xbox Series X/S
2026	Haunted Lands	alevgor	Microsoft Windows
