= Toy Defense =

2012 video game

Toy Defense (Russian: Солдатики) is a tower defense game developed by Melesta Games. The first release of the game took place on October 17, 2012. The first two games in the series are dedicated to the World Wars, while the third takes place in a fictional location.

== Overview ==
Since 2015, Wargaming has entered into a strategic partnership with Melesta Games and has worked together to develop the subsequent games in the series. Toy Defense 2, as well as Wargaming games, is dedicated to the World War II theme.

The games consist of a single-player mission mode, as well as tournament and arena modes. single-player mode during which the player completes missions. Each mission successfully completed brings awards (such as stars in Toy Defense 2), the number of which depends on the success of its mission. Playing in the tournaments or arenas allows for players to compete with others online, and can receive additional rewards.

== Toy Defense 2 ==
Toy Defense 2 was a sequel to the previous game and was released on October 8, 2015. The game received updated graphics and an improved interface, as well as enhanced upgrades for units and commanders. The players are given four World War II nations (USSR, UK, US and France). Single-player missions are devoted to the most famous battles (Battle of Stalingrad, Operation Crusader and Operation Overlord, Battle of Iwo Jima, etc.).

== Toy Defense 3: Fantasy ==
Toy Defense Fantasy was released in 2014. The basic principle of the game remained the same. However, the events unfold in a fantasy world in the spirit of the Middle Ages. Archers, castles, dragons, magicians and more are used instead of soldiers, planes and tanks.

In 2016, after the strategic partnership agreement was concluded and the company management changed, the game was significantly updated.

In 2018, it was named the best game in its genre by the Google Play edition.

On Metacritic, the game received 68 points out of 100.
