= Farm Frenzy =

- Genre: Time management
- Developers: Melesta; HeroCraft
- Publisher: Alawar Entertainment
- Platforms: Windows; Mac iPhone; Android; Nintendo DS; Windows Phone; J2ME; PlayStation Store (PSP/PS3)
- First release: Farm Frenzy; December 2007
- Latest release: Farm Frenzy: Refreshed; January 2021

Farm Frenzy (Russian: Весёлая ферма) is a series of downloadable casual games developed by Melesta Games and published by Alawar Entertainment. The Android version of the game was developed by HeroCraft. The series utilizes a point-and-click arcade gameplay model that enables the player to manage the production processes on a farm using a mouse. Most of its success came on mobile platforms. It debuted in December 2007 on Windows.

Some games of the series became available to download as PlayStation Minis through the PlayStation Store. They could be played on both the PlayStation Portable (PSP) and the PlayStation 3 (PS3). The games available were: Farm Frenzy, Farm Frenzy 2, Farm Frenzy: Pizza Party, and Farm Frenzy 3.

== Games ==
- Farm Frenzy (December 2, 2007)
- Farm Frenzy 2 (August 27, 2008)
- Farm Frenzy 3 (September 11, 2009)
- Farm Frenzy 3: American Pie (February 15, 2010)
- Farm Frenzy Pack (February 19, 2010, Compilation includes 5 games which are the first 3 games plus American Pie and Pizza Party)
- Farm Frenzy 3: Russian Roulette (May 26, 2010)
- Farm Frenzy 3: Madagascar (August 18, 2010)
- Farm Frenzy 3: Ice Domain (August 27, 2010, Also known as Farm Frenzy: Ice Age)
- Farm Frenzy: Animal Country (September 28, 2010)
- Farm Frenzy: Gone Fishing (September 30, 2010)
- Farm Frenzy: Ancient Rome (April 5, 2011)
- Farm Frenzy: Pizza Party (May 9, 2011)
- Crop Busters (June 2, 2011)
- Farm Frenzy: Viking Heroes (November 2, 2011)
- Farm Frenzy Teil 1-3 (October 15, 2012, This compilation includes Farm Frenzy 1, 2 and 3)
- Farm Frenzy 4 (April 29, 2014)
- Alawar Farm Frenzy Bundle (September 9, 2014, This compilation includes Farm Frenzy 1, 2, 3 and Pizza Party)
- Farm Frenzy: Hurricane Season (July 3, 2015)
- Farm Frenzy: Collection (August 21, 2015, Includes all previous games)
- Farm Frenzy: Heave Ho (August 26, 2015)
- Farm Frenzy: Refreshed (January 27, 2021)

== Reception ==
Farm Frenzy was voted Best Casual Game of 2008 at GDC 2008. Farm Frenzy 2 was awarded the iParenting Media Award in 2009, in recognition of its suitability for families and children.
