= Similarweb =

Provider of website rankings and analytics

Similarweb Ltd.

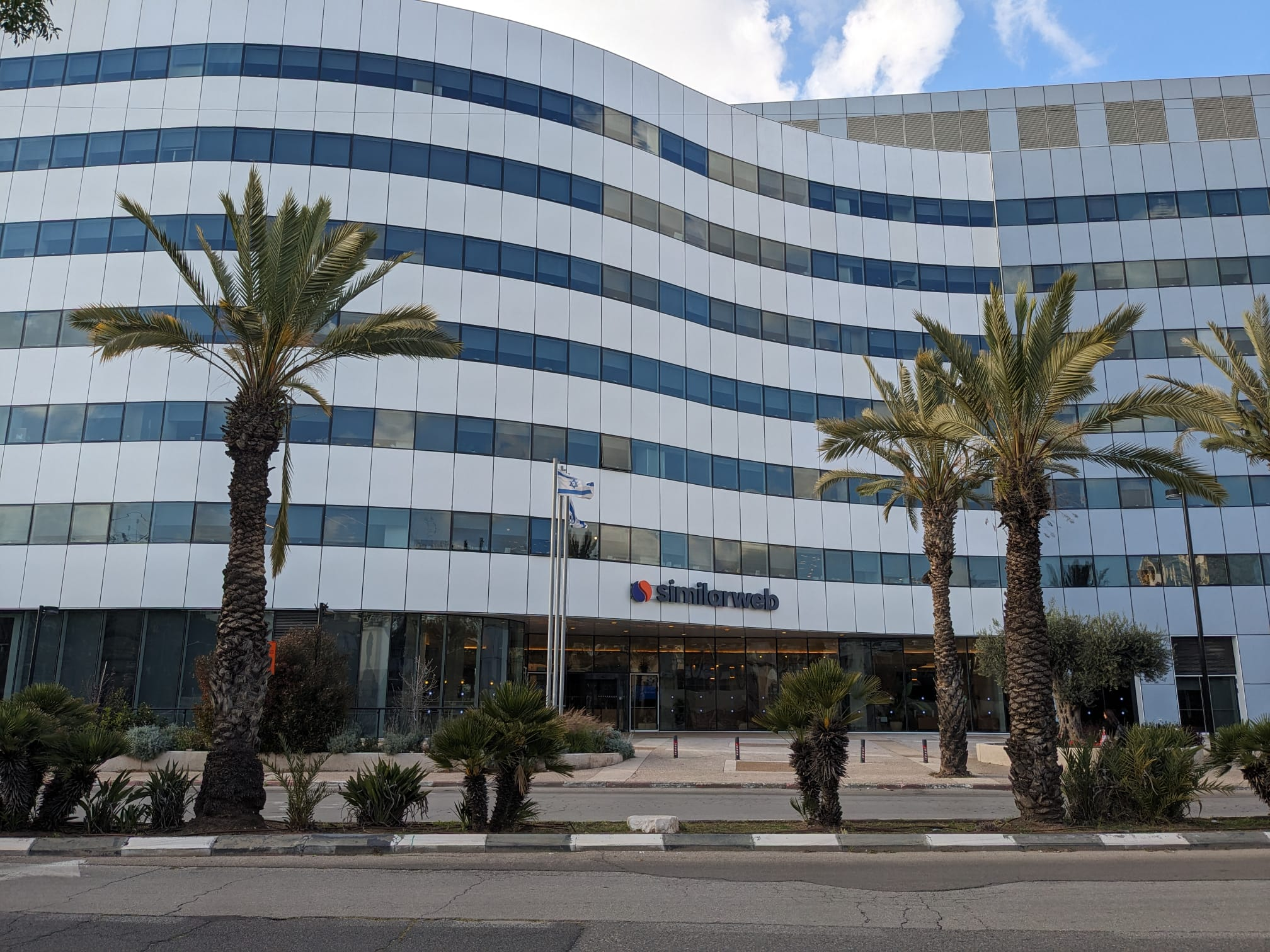
- Website type: Public
- Traded as: NYSE: SMWB
- Founded: 2007; 19 years ago
- Headquarters: New York City, US; Givatayim, Israel; London, UK
- Area served: Worldwide
- Founder: Or Offer
- Chairperson: Or Offer
- CEO: Michael Akkerman
- Key people: Or Offer (CEO)
- Industry: Market intelligence
- Services: Web analytics, web traffic and ranking
- Revenue: ▲$282.6 million (2025)
- Net income: ▼ −US$32.9 million (2025)
- Employees: 1,288
- Website: similarweb.com
- Launched: 2007
- Current status: Online

Similarweb Ltd. is a global software development and data aggregation company specializing in mobile app and web analytics, web traffic, digital performance, SEO tools and generative engine optimization tools. Founded in Israel, the company has 12 offices worldwide (as of 2021). Similarweb went public on the New York Stock Exchange in May 2021.

== History ==
The company was founded in 2007 by Or Offer in Tel Aviv, Israel. While trying to scale up a jewelry business, Offer built a web analytics tool that would help him learn about the competition, which led to SimilarWeb's development. By 2009, Similarweb won the first Israeli SeedCamp, attracting the attention of international media and investors. The company was described as a competitor to Alexa.

On February 24, 2014, Naspers invested $18 million into Similarweb and leading their Series C round. Within a month, Similarweb used a part of the capital for the acquisition of Israeli early-stage company TapDog for a few million dollars in shares and cash, less than a year after TapDog was founded.

In May 2021, Similarweb made its public debut on the NYSE at a $1.6 billion valuation.

Effective November 2026, Michael Akkerman will be Chief Executive Officer.

== Technology ==
Similarweb develops tools that enable the analysis of the traffic and behavior of users on websites and apps. The service provides datasets and a platform marketed for individuals, teams, or companies requiring data for marketing, sales, and market research. The data is collected from a number of different sources that provide information about the internet and app usage of users, including various information partners, and anonymous data from users of the various dedicated browser addons that the company distributes.

== Ranking ==
Similarweb ranks websites and apps based on traffic and engagement metrics. Its ranking is calculated according to the collected datasets and is updated on a monthly basis with new data. Also, The ranking system covers 210 categories of websites and apps in 190 countries and was designed to be an estimate of a website's popularity and growth potential. The company ranks websites based on traffic and engagement data, and ranks apps in the App Store (iOS/iPadOS) and Google Play Store based on downloads, installs and active user data.

== Acquisitions ==
Since its founding, Similarweb has made several acquisitions:

- 2015 – Swayy (personalized content discovery platform developer).
- 2015 – Quettra, (mobile data insights/analytics provider).
- 2021 – Embee (mobile data insights provider).
- 2022 – RankRanger (provides keyword rank tracking services and advanced APIs, that have been added to Similarweb's existing SEO tools).
- 2024 – Admetricks and 42matters (ad and app intelligence).
- 2025 – The Search Monitor (paid search, affiliate marketing solutions).

== See also ==
- List of most-visited websites
- List of most-popular Android apps
