= Moon Active =

Israeli video game company

- Native name: מון אקטיב בע"מ
- Type: Private
- Industry: Video game
- Founded: 2011
- Founder: Samuel Albin
- Headquarters: Tel Aviv, Israel
- Products: Coin Master
- Number of employees: 1,300 (October 2021)

Moon Active (Hebrew: מון אקטיב בע"מ) is a private Israeli company that develops online games.

== History ==
The company was founded in 2011 by Samuel Albin and is engaged in the development of online games. The company's headquarters is located in Tel Aviv, where approximately 800 employees were working as of October 2021. Additionally, around 500 employees are based in Europe, including a development center in Kyiv and an office in London.

Since its founding in 2011, the company has raised only $10 million. The company's main investors are: Guy Gamzo, Gigi Levy-Weiss, David Alliance, Or Offer, Jonathan Colbert and the Insight Partners.

In its early years, the company developed four games, none of which were successful. In January 2016, the company released Coin Master for smartphones on the iOS and Android operating systems, which became a major success in revenue, the game's gross revenue (including commissions to Apple and Google) reached $100 million in 2018, $550 million in 2019, and $1.25 billion in 2020. The game features a slot machine that grants coins to players, who must then build villages and raid the villages of other players. While the game is free-to-play, frequent gameplay often requires in-app purchases. The game has been criticized for luring young players into spending real-life currency.

At the beginning of 2020, the venture capital Insight Partners purchased 10% of the company's shares for $125 million, turning the company into a unicorn.

In December 2020, the company acquired Melsoft, a Cyprus-based company with a development center in Belarus, known for developing network games such as Family Island and My Cafe.

In November 2021, the company conducted a secondary fundraising round, during which existing shareholders, including employees and investors, sold shares totaling $300 million, based on a company valuation of $5 billion.

In August 2024, Moon Active hit a $6 billion milestone with Coin Master.

In January 2025, the company announced layoffs. At the time, Coin Master was its largest title, and Travel Town was its second largest, with 56 million lifetime downloads and $500 million in lifetime spending.

In June 2026, Moon Active signed a 10-year lease for 22,000 square meters across 10 floors in the Beyond Towers skyscraper in Givatayim, at a total annual cost of approximately NIS 33 million.

== See also ==
- Appcharge, Israel-based game distributor
