= Beholder (video game) =

2016 video game

- Developer: Warm Lamp Games
- Publisher: Alawar Entertainment
- Producer: Evgeny Sister
- Designer: Kseniya Zheyda
- Artist: Ivan Chuchuyko
- Writer: Valeria Khong
- Engine: Unity
- Platforms: Linux, macOS, Windows, Android, iOS, PlayStation 4, Xbox One, Nintendo Switch
- Release: WW: November 9, 2016
- Genres: Adventure, Strategy
- Mode: Single-player

Beholder is a adventure video game about life in a totalitarian police state, in which privacy does not exist: everything is controlled by the state. The game was developed by Warm Lamp Games and published by Alawar Entertainment on November 9, 2016. The game is supported on Windows, macOS, Linux, Android, iPadOS and iOS.

== Story ==
Gameplay screenshot

The main figure is Carl: a government-installed landlord in a totalitarian police state. The state appoints Carl to spy on the tenants and gather as much information as possible about them over time. The player can bug apartments while tenants are not in them, search their belongings for whatever can threaten the authority of the state, and profile them. The state requires the player to report anyone capable of violating the law or plotting subversive activities.

The game offers the player the choice of either following the commands of the government or siding with the people who suffer from the oppressive directives.

Each game character has its personality, circumstances, and issues. Every decision that a player makes, affects the way the story unfolds. The game has multiple endings, each of them being the direct result of decisions made by the player.

== Development ==
Beholder was developed by the Russian team at Warm Lamp Games, located in Barnaul. The team was created based on the Barnaul division of Alawar Stargaze. The Work on the project began in October 2015. The prototype of Beholder contained elements of the economic game, which were expressed in the fact that the residents of the house paid rent to the main character for housing, and the player had to improve his living conditions, Later the creators decided to remove them. On April 26, 2016, the game appeared on the Kickstarter crowdfunding platform, where the developers requested $25,000 to fund the game's creation. During the development, this amount was never needed, and the decision was made to close the funding before the deadline. The game was also introduced on Steam Greenlight and, on May 9, reached 10th place among the projects submitted for approval by the community. During game creation, developers focused on games like Papers, Please and This War of Mine, as well as the works of George Orwell and Aldous Huxley.

== Release and DLC ==
On October 6, 2016, a demo of Beholder appeared on the Steam store.

The game was released for Windows, MacOS and Linux on November 9, 2016. On May 17, 2017, the game was released for iOS and Android operating systems. On January 16 and 19, 2018, it was released for PlayStation 4 and Xbox One respectively.

On May 18, 2017, Steam released a DLC called Beholder - Blissful Sleep. In it, the government issues a bill which exposes all citizens who have reached the age of 85 to euthanasia. Hector Medina, the landlord succeeded by Carl Stein, is about 65 years old, but due to an error, Hector's age has been corrected to "85 years old". The player has to choose to either submit to fate and fall asleep with a "Blissful sleep" or to avoid euthanasia by various methods. Unlike in the base game, the protagonist has no family, except for a cat and his 30-year-old son, who works on the construction of a railway to the north.

== Reception ==
Reception

Aggregate score
Aggregator	Score
Metacritic	PC: 75/100 iOS: 80/100; PS4: 63/100; XONE: 74/100; NS: 58/100

Review scores
Publication	Score
Eurogamer	PC: 8/10
GameSpot	PC: 5/10
Push Square	PS4: 7/10
TouchArcade	iOS: 5/5

Beholder received positive reviews from most critics for the PC and iOS versions.

While praising the controls, Eurogamer's Mateusz Zdanowicz said, "Gameplay will prove uncomplicated for everyone who has ever dealt with classic adventure games." He called the game "an interesting and quite unusual title, although in terms of mechanics it offers nothing extraordinary." He then said "An interesting plot setting combined with the need to make difficult decisions determine the strength of this independent production."

Tasos Lazarides of TouchArcade also praised the controls saying, "Controlling your character is pretty easy even on smaller phone screens, with the contextual icons helping you navigate your environments without much trouble." He also praised the game's art style and music stating, "With great art and music and plenty of choices, which lead to different endings, Beholder is definitely a game you should be playing." On the other hand, James O'Conner of GameSpot gave the game a mixed review, praising the game's concept, though being mixed the game's repetitive gameplay stating: "Beholder is based on a strong concept, and it has moments that land well, but it's also held back by repetition and an unexciting script".

The console ports of the game received mixed reviews. Gabriella Petty of Push Square wrote, "Beholder: Complete Edition is a fun strategy game. Its gorgeous yet subtle dystopian aesthetic illustrates a totalitarian world on the brink of revolution, with an interesting set of characters and soundtrack to boot." She then said "But while it's geared towards player agency, it can feel like you're under the thumb of the state more often than not, and that means you may feel forced to walk a path you didn't necessarily choose."

=== Awards ===
Beholder has been nominated and won several conference awards:

- Excellence in Game Design and Best Indie Game awards at the Minsk DevGAMM Conference 2016.
- Best Adventure Game @ IGN Russia
- Winner in Entertainment Category @ GDWC, 2016
- Best in Play @ Game Developers Conference, GDC Play 2017
- Most Creative & Original Game, Best Indie Game @ Game Connection America, 2017

== Sequel ==
A sequel to the game, Beholder 2, was released for Windows, macOS, and Linux on December 4, 2018, for Android and iOS on August 16, 2019, for Nintendo Switch and PlayStation 4 on October 22, 2019, and for Xbox One on April 9, 2020.

A third game, Beholder 3, was released for Windows on March 3, 2022, and PlayStation 4 and 5, Xbox One and Xbox Series X|S on December 15, 2022.

A spin-off titled Beholder: Conductor released April 23, 2025.

== Short film ==
External videos
- Beholder short live-action film

Russian filmmakers Nikita Ordynskiy and Liliya Tkach released a live-action short film for Beholder, with Russian actor Evgeniy Stychkin playing the role of Carl. The film was uploaded to YouTube on February 1, 2019.
