= Melsoft Games =

Lithuanian video game developer

- Type: Private
- Industry: Mobile games
- Founded: 2007
- Headquarters: Cyprus
- Number of employees: 240 (2020)
- Parent: Moon Active Ltd.
- Website: www.melsoft-games.com

Melsoft Games (formerly Melesta Games) is a Belarusian video game developer focusing on casual mobile games. The company was founded in Belarus in 2007 and later opened offices in Cyprus and Lithuania. It was acquired by Israeli mobile video game developer Moon Active in December 2020.

== History ==
Melsoft was founded in Minsk in 2007 as Melesta Games, and it released its first game, Farm Frenzy, the same year. In 2012, it switched its focus to mobile gaming. It signed a partnership with UK game developer Wargaming in 2016. Melesta Games changed its name to Melsoft Games.

Melsoft was acquired by Israeli mobile video game developer Moon Active in December 2020.

== List of Games ==
- Dream Farm
- Family Island
- Farm Frenzy (PC, iOS, Android, DS)
- Farm Frenzy: Refreshed
- Farm Frenzy 2
- Green City
- Green City 2
- Island Realms
- Jo's Dream: Organic Coffee
- Jo's Dream: Organic Coffee 2
- Kingdom's Heyday
- Monster Mutiny
- My Cafe
- Rolling Idols
- Rolling Idols: Lost City
- Space Roadkill
- Spooky Mall
- Snow Globe: Farm World
- Toy Defense (PC, iOS, Android, 3DS)
- Toy Defense 2
- Toy Defense 3: Fantasy
- Toy Monsters
- Virtual Farm
- Virtual Farm 2
- Zuba
