= Or Offer =

Israeli entrepreneur and investor

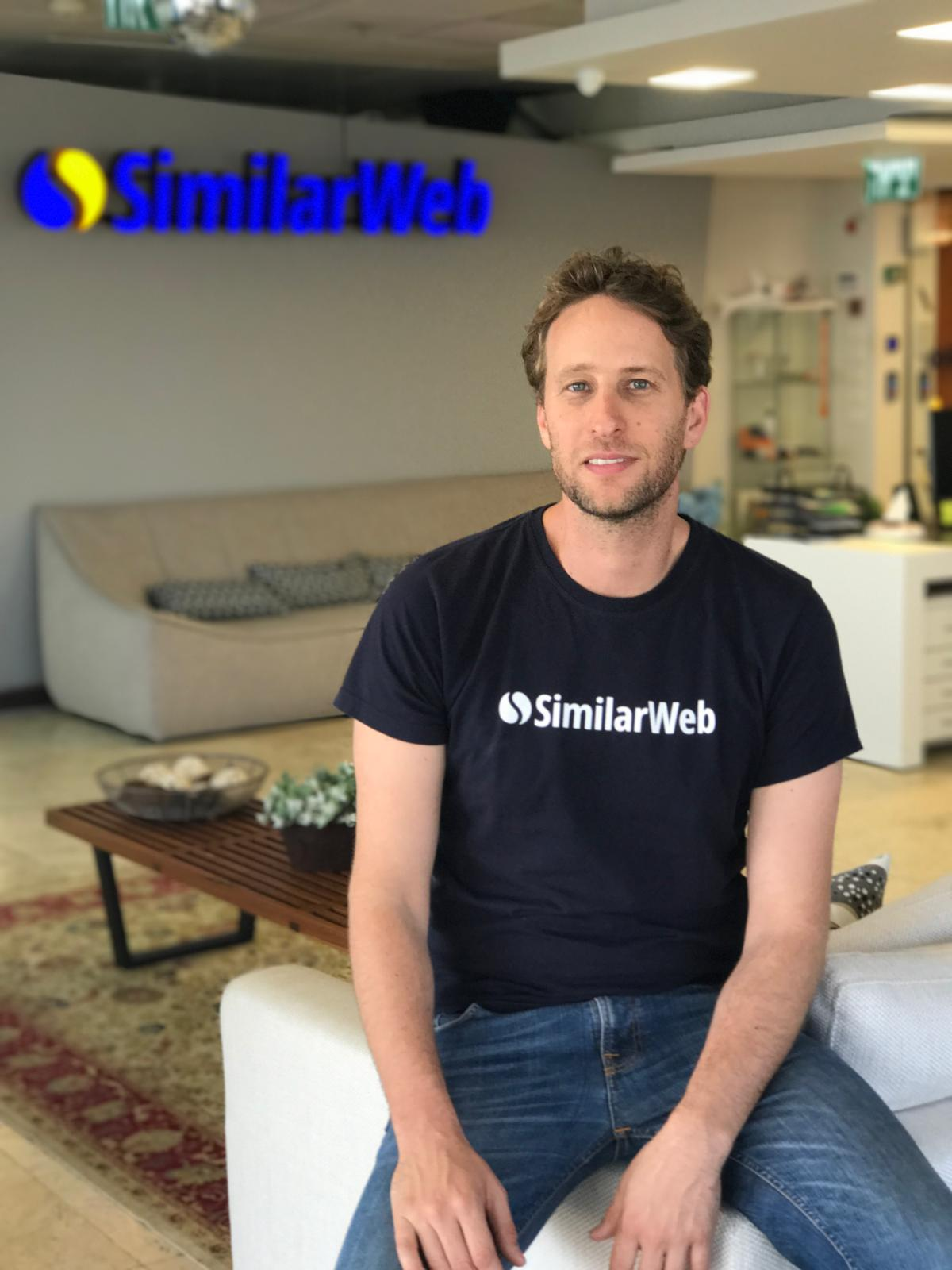
- Born: 1983 (age 42–43); Israel
- Education: Reichman University (B.A. in Business Administration, 2008)
- Occupations: Entrepreneur, investor
- Known for: CEO and Founder of Similarweb
- Spouse: Married
- Children: 3

Or Offer (born: 1983; Hebrew: אור עופר) is an Israeli entrepreneur and investor. He is the founder and chief executive officer (CEO) of Similarweb, a digital market intelligence company that was listed on the NYSE in 2021 at a valuation of $1.6 billion.

== Early life and education ==
Offer was raised in Tzur Hadassah, near Jerusalem, in a family of artists and jewellery designers. He attended Boyar High School in Jerusalem and served in the Israel Defense Forces as a fighter and dog operator in the Oketz (canine) unit.

Following his military service, he studied at the Interdisciplinary Center Herzliya (now Reichman University) and received his B.A. in Business Administration in 2008.

== Career ==
=== Similarweb ===
After completing his military service, Offer founded a jewellery chain with physical and online stores. During market research, he identified the difficulty of finding similar websites online, which led him to develop a browser extension in 2007 that became the foundation of Similarweb. Offer has served as the company’s CEO since then.

In 2011, Offer directed the company’s shift from a consumer-oriented browser tool to a digital market analysis platform for businesses and investors. Under his leadership, Similarweb grew to over 1,200 employees across 12 offices. In May 2021, the company completed its initial public offering (IPO) on the NYSE with a valuation of approximately $1.6 billion.

In May 2026 Offer announced that he will be stepping down from his position as CEO within a year.

Offer is described as one of the few "sole founders" in the Israeli technology sector. His background in a combat unit, rather than in a military intelligence division (which is common among Israeli tech founders), has also been noted as distinctive.

=== Other Ventures and Investments ===
Offer was a founding partner at AfterDownload, which was later acquired by IronSource. He is also an active angel investor and serves on advisory boards of several startups, including Moon Active, OpenWeb, Reco, and GrowthSpace. In addition, he is a member of the General Assembly at Reichman University.

== Recognition ==
Offer has been featured in TheMarker (2015), Globes (2017), and Ice (2021) lists of promising young leaders under the age of 40. He was also included in the list of Top 100 Influencers in the Israeli High Tech, Geektime (2015).

== Personal life ==
Offer lives in Kfar Shmaryahu with his wife and three children.
