= Slotomania =

2011 mobile video game

- Developer: Playtika
- Publisher: Playtika
- Platforms: iOS, Android, Windows Phone
- Release: 2011
- Genre: Casual mobile game
- Mode: Single-player

Slotomania is a free casual mobile game developed by the Israeli studio Playtika in 2011.

The game can be played on both the iPhone and iPad, as well as on the Android and Windows Phone platforms.

== History ==
Slotomania was first released in September 2011, one year after Playtika was founded in 2010. Playtika went public in January 2021 and was bought by Caesars Entertainment Corporation in May 2021.

Nearly half of all users are from the United States, with the remaining players based in diverse countries. There were more than 2 million daily active users in April 2021, and over 70 million cumulative downloads. Slotomania was among the most popular iPhone and iPad mobile games in the US in 2021.

The first slot machine title released on Slotomania was Farm Fortune, which is still one of the most popular slot machines available in the app.

== Gameplay ==
Slotomania follows a "freemium" model where registration and basic gameplay is free. The app also offers in-game purchases to enhance gameplay, but players can pay to buy coins and upgrade their game experience. The game features a highly interactive story progression. Slotomania players can interact with each other, and there are also live tournaments.

As a social video slots game, Slotomania has over 160 different free slots games. The game allows players to buy coins, as well as send free gifts to friends. A range of meta features that are unique to the game include Slotostories, the only narrative-driven slot with story progression, and features like Quest Saga, Ballinko, Snakes & Ladders, hidden object games, among others. Slotomania players can interact with each other, play live tournaments, chat with their "SlotoClans", send and receive SlotoCards and free gifts. Free gifts contain 500 Slotomania coins each.

=== Status tiers ===
The game features the following status tiers:

- Bronze
- Silver
- Gold
- Platinum
- Diamond
- Royal diamond
- Black diamond

As players progress, they receive increasing amounts of free coins, bigger multipliers, better bonuses and more. New slot machines and casinos are also unlocked as players level up.

=== Bonus coins ===
Users receive a Welcome Bonus of 1 million coins when they first sign up for Slotomania. Free Special Bonuses are offered every 3 hours, and other additional bonuses such as the Mega Bonus, Lotto Bonus and Store Bonus are available.

=== Collectible albums ===
Players can also access collectible albums of SlotoCards, each of which have a different theme and storyline. When an Album is completed, players receive large coin prizes and additional in-game benefits.

SlotoCards Albums are available all year round. An example of an Album is the Enchanted Forest Album, which features in-game characters such as Mighty Gorilla, Silver Lion and Despicable Wolf. There are also Clan Albums that are released sporadically throughout the year where all members of a Clan can complete the album together. If one player earns a card, all players in the Clan receive it too. SlotoCards albums also include The Shiny Show mini-feature, where players can test their luck to win additional prizes.

=== SlotoClans ===
In early 2019, Slotomania introduced a new feature called SlotoClans, which enables players to form groups together inside the game to earn more bonuses and help each other progress through the various challenges. Each week, players are encouraged to earn enough points to earn the key to open a chest full of free prizes. Players can also enjoy an extra bonus whenever a fellow Clan member wins a Jackpot or makes a purchase.

== See also ==
- Fishdom
- Coin Master
