= Insight Partners =

American investment manager

Insight Venture Management, LLC
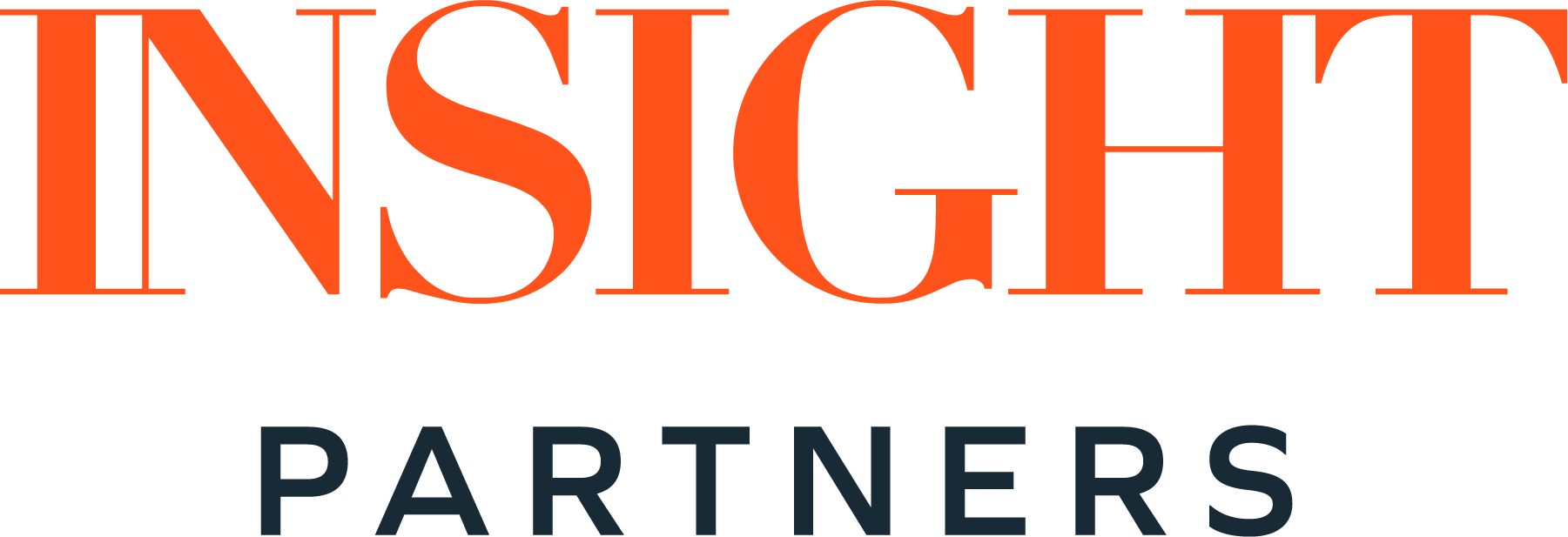
- Type: Private
- Industry: Private Equity
- Founded: 1995; 31 years ago
- Founders: Jeff Horing; Jerry Murdock
- Headquarters: New York City, New York, U.S.
- AUM: US$90 billion (2025)
- Number of employees: 600+ (2025)
- Website: insightpartners.com

Insight Venture Management, LLC (commonly referred to as Insight Partners and previously Insight Venture Partners) is a global venture capital and private equity firm that invests in software and internet businesses. The company is headquartered in New York City, also has offices in London, Tel Aviv, and Palo Alto. As of April 2025, the firm has approximately $90 billion in assets under management.

== History ==
Insight Partners was founded in 1995 by Jeff Horing and Jerry Murdock.

In April 2021, Insight Partners raised $1.56 billion for the Insight Partners Opportunities Fund I LP, a separate fund from its primary growth-investment vehicles. Also in 2021, Insight Partners put $15 million of its capital into a new fund, the Vision Capital 2020 LP Fund, which supports minority-led firms raising early-stage funds. In May 2021, the company raised a US$75 million Series C round led by Insight Partners, with participation from Zeev Ventures, Emerge, F2 Venture Capital, 01 Advisors, Dynamic Loop Capital, Fort Ross Ventures and Vintage Investment Partners, bringing its total funding to approximately US$127 million.

In February 2022, the company announced it had raised $20 billion for its twelfth flagship fund, more than doubling the size of its previous flagship fund. In July 2022, Insight Partners established the Enterprise Technology Exchange (ETX), an advisory group responsible for helping emerging IT companies navigate uncertain markets.

In September 2024, Mastercard acquired cybersecurity company Recorded Future for $2.65 billion from Insight Partners.

On October 25, 2024, Insight Partners experienced a ransomware breach, affecting over 12,000 users in what was described as a "sophisticated social engineering attack." This breach compromised sensitive data, including banking, tax, personal information of employees, and details related to limited partners and portfolio companies. The breach was resolved on January 16, 2025, and victims were notified of the breach in September 2025.

In January 2025, Insight announced that it raised $12.5 billion across its thirteenth flagship fund and a separate structured‑equity vehicle.

In December 2025, Insight Partners appointed General Timothy D. Haugh, USAF (Ret.), former Director of the National Security Agency and Commander of U.S. Cyber Command, to its Government Advisory Board.

In January 2026, it was reported that Kate Lowry, a former vice president at Insight Partners, was suing the firm and alleging disability discrimination, gender discrimination, and wrongful termination.

In January 2026, Insight Partners acquired Venn, a quantitative investment analytics tool, from Two Sigma for an undisclosed amount. Insight Partners plans to merge Venn with its own portfolio management and analytics tool, Solovis.

=== Portfolio ===
Insight has stated that it has invested in over 875 companies as of June 30, 2025. The list of portfolio companies includes: OpenAI, Databricks, Wiz Inc., Anthropic, Udemy, Lightricks, Hootsuite, Monday.Com, SentinelOne, Shopify, Moon Active and many others.

== Operations ==
Media coverage has described Insight's sourcing approach as heavily outbound, supported by an analyst program that identifies software companies, and by an internal "Onsite" team that provides portfolio support.
