= Playtika =

Gaming company

Playtika Holding Corp.
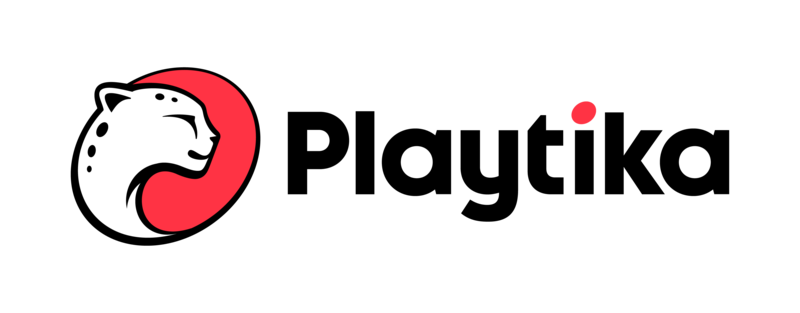

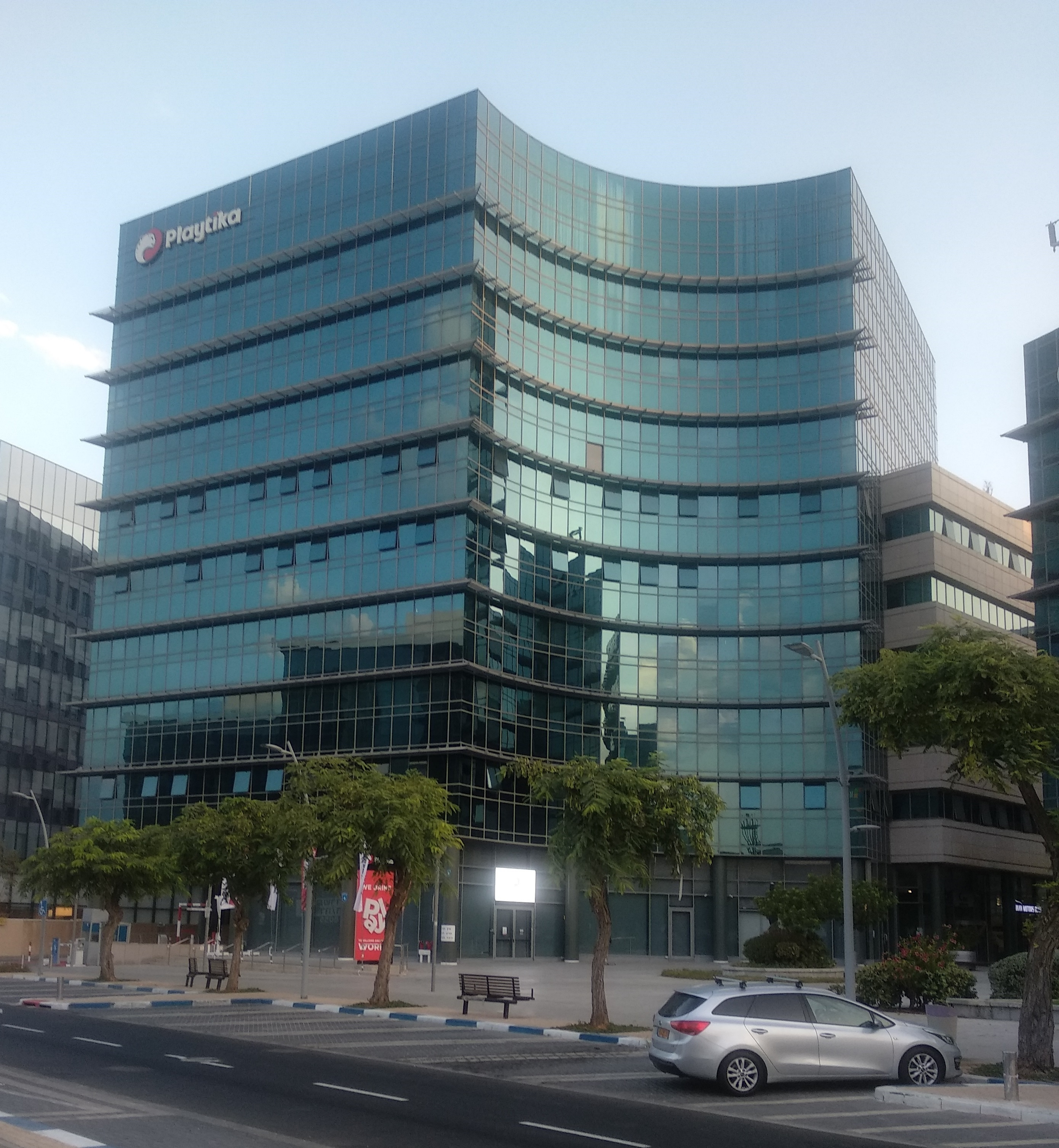
- Type: Public
- Traded as: Nasdaq: PLTK; Russell 1000 component
- Industry: Video games
- Founded: 2010; 16 years ago
- Founders: Robert Antokol; Uri Shahak
- Headquarters: Herzliya, Israel
- Number of locations: 15 (2025)
- Key people: Robert Antokol
- Products: Online games, Mobile games
- Revenue: ▼US$2.55 billion (2024)
- Net income: ▼US$162 million (2024)
- Owner: Alpha Frontier (52%)
- Number of employees: 3,500 (31 December 2024)
- Website: playtika.com

Playtika Holding Corp. is an Israeli digital entertainment company specializing in the development and publication of mobile games. In 2021, Playtika had over 35 million monthly active users.

== History ==
The company was founded in 2010 by Robert Antokol and Uri Shahak (son of former Chief of Staff of the Israel Defense Forces and Israeli Minister Amnon Lipkin-Shahak). In May 2011, the company was bought by Caesars Entertainment Corporation. Antokol remained the CEO of Playtika, and the company remained an independent unit within Caesars.

In July 2016, the company's operations were acquired by a Chinese consortium led by Shi Yuzhu's Giant, valued at 4.4 billion dollars.

Headquartered in Herzliya, Israel, the company has over three thousand employees in offices worldwide including Tel-Aviv, Belarus, Ukraine and Canada.

Playtika started off in the casino-style genre of "Social Casino Games". This genre uses the central elements of popular casino games but players cannot use real cash within the gameplay, nor can they win real money.

At January 2018, Playtika set up a $400 million Israel investment fund. The fund plans to invest in Israeli mobile and Internet digital entertainment and consumer product companies.

In October 2017, Playtika entered the casual games niche with its acquisition of the Israeli-based games studio, Jelly Button. In December 2018, the company took another step in its new diversification strategy with the acquisition of Berlin-based casual games studio, Wooga. In January 2019, the company acquired a Vienna-based casual games studio, Super treat.

In May 2019, the company launched an independent division dedicated to the creation and rapid development of casual games which plans to launch several new games every year.

The announcement introducing the new independent division was made at the company's Global Summit in Ibiza, where over 2,500 employees from Playtika's then 16 locations around the world gathered for a company event.

In August 2019, Playtika acquired Finnish mobile game company Seriously, publisher of Best Fiends, a cartoon-style mobile game that launched in 2014.

In March 2020, Playtika donated its catered meals and food to local communities to provide relief for the COVID-19 pandemic.

In January 2021, Playtika filed for an IPO. On 20 January 2021, Playtika completed its initial public offering of approximately 80M shares of common stock at $27 per share. Alpha Frontier's holding was reduced to 77% with the IPO.

In March 2022, Playtika announced the company had acquired the Israel-based, online building and shooting simulator software development company JustPlay.LOL, most known for creating the multiplayer game 1V1.LOL. On 12 December 2022, Playtika announced it would undergo a 15% reduction in staff, amounting to 615 employees being laid off.

In January 2023, Playtika offered a proposal to acquire the Finland-based, mobile game developer Rovio Entertainment, most known for creating the Angry Birds series of games and media for $736 million US ($9.84 per share). Rovio later publicly responded on 20 January that their board of directors were unaware of the offer and that shareholder and regulatory approvals would be needed. The discussions between Playtika and Rovio ultimately concluded without an agreement on 22 March 2023.

In August 2023, Playtika announced its definitive agreement to pay $89.4 million to $165 million to acquire Azerion‘s Youda Games portfolio of games. In the subsequent weeks, Playtika completed the purchase of Youda Games' portfolio of games from Azerion.

In September 2023, it was announced that Playtika would acquire the Tel Aviv-headquartered mobile games studio Innplay Labs for an upfront fee of $80 million and as much as $300 million. Shortly thereafter, Playtika announced that it acquired Innplay Labs. In January 2024, Playtika reduced its headcount by 10%, amounting to 300-400 layoffs. Those affected were workers located outside of Israel. In November 2025, Playtika announced plans to lay off about 20% of its workforce (approximately 700-800 employees) beginning in December. The layoffs would affect the development teams of Best Friends and Redecor.

== Games ==
The company operates the following games, among others:

- 1V1.LOL – Third person shooter
- Best Fiends – puzzle video game
- Best Fiends Star – puzzle video game
- Bingo Blitz – bingo
- Board Kings – casual game / board game style
- Caesars Slots – slot machines
- House of Fun – slot machines
- June's Journey – hidden object game
- Pearls Peril – hidden object game
- Pirate Kings
- Poker Heat – Texas hold 'em online poker
- Redecor – home design game
- Slotomania – slot machines
- Solitaire Grand Harvest – solitaire card game
- Vegas Downtown Slots – slot machines
- World Series of Poker – Texas hold 'em online poker based on the TV series of the same name

== See also ==
- Economy of Israel
