= Coin Master =

2016 mobile video game

- Developer: Moon Active
- Publisher: Moon Active
- Platforms: Android iOS iPadOS
- Release: 2016
- Genre: Casual mobile game
- Mode: Single-player

Coin Master is a free-to-play strategy luck and skill based resource management casual mobile game in the Adventure genre that allows players to build virtual villages in a variety of themed levels after accumulating virtual coins through a virtual spin game. The game was developed by Tel Aviv, Israel-based company Moon Active.

Coin Master has been downloaded over 300 million times worldwide. It was also in the top-grossing mobile games in the UK (since February 2019) and Germany (since June 2019).

== Gameplay ==
The objective of Coin Master is to win coins using strategy, skill and luck to upgrade items in order to build up villages and progress through the levels. Coin Master can be found under the 'Adventure Game' category in the app stores.

The main focus of the game is to use strategy luck and skill to build and improve villages, with every village being an individual level. Coin Master is about merging luck with clever strategies. In order to build villages or attack the villages of other players, users must spin a simple simulated slot to win coins. The number of hourly spins are limited to five (but it gets extended as level progress), but additional attempts and items can be purchased through in-app purchases. Some free spins are gifted by Coin Master through links on their social channels and by subscribing to their email newsletter and by completing in-game events. Successful players are distinguished from less successful ones by their ability to manage their resources strategically, allowing them to build more villages and progress through the game quicker.

Coins are acquired by spinning and winning, attacking another player's village, or raiding another player's fortune, completing villages or completing in-game tasks. A maximum of five shields, as well as the pet Rhino, can be used to defend villages. When a player's village is attacked, the game also allows "revenge" so a player can launch a counterattack.

The player needs to upgrade 5-6 items in every village in order to progress to the next level.

As of March 2026, there are 605 levels in the game. Each village has its own unique theme. Coins are used to upgrade village items and when players upgrade all items in the village, the game will progress to the next level with a new village.

=== Star XP ===
Stars are earned from advancing up in villages, collecting cards and receiving emotes. The star XP shows the progress of the players in the game (in addition to the village progress), the higher the XP the higher the progress.

=== Card collecting ===
Another feature in the game is the 'Card Collection'. Cards can be collected to complete card sets, which usually rewards the player with spins and pet experience. Chests with collectible cards inside them can be collected using coins, during raids, rewarded for reaching the next level or bought using coins. Cards differ in value and there are several rarities.

=== Pets ===
There are three pets in the game - Foxy, Tiger and Rhino. Each pet gives a different limited time effect for the player, Foxy is available for free from village 30, Tiger and Rhino can be acquired when completing regular card sets.

Pets can be raised by obtaining treats for them and raising their XP (experience points) by using XP potions. Foxy gives the player extra coins for a raid up to 119% of player's raid value. Tiger gives the player extra coins for attacks. These extra coins can get up to 410% of the attack value. Rhino protects player's village from attacks. This pet protects up to 70% of the attacks on their village. Additionally, pets need to be kept awake with treats. For each treat they stay awake (usable) for 4 hours. They can stay awake for longer periods of time with multiple treats.

Swapping pets based on the gameplay is an important strategy within the game.

=== Gifts ===
Players can gift each friend one Spin every 48 hours, and they can do the same for one. As long as the Spin bar is empty, they can collect up to 100 Spins every day. Gifting Spins to friends will not decrease the player's own inventory, but to collect 100 spins every day, one needs to have 200 active friends on Facebook.

=== Teams ===
Teams is a section in game that allows the players to play and interact with other players, the player can enter a team that can hold up to 50 players, players can send messages and emotes in the chat of the team, ask for spins and cards, and also advance and win prizes if all players are active players who spin the slot and advance in the game, with these actions they contribute to the progress in the team's progress bar and rank. This event is called team chest league, team castle and team battle.

=== Leaderboard ===
The Leaderboards are lists of the highest ranked players in the players circle of friends, country, and the global Coin Master community.

=== Currencies ===
Coin Master also offers a rich set of more than 20 different types of resources. Currencies are used in the game in different promotions, and events, each currency type is exclusive and can be used only in a specific event/promotion. Gems are one of the in-game currencies which can be earned in events and can be used at The Gems Market.

== Commercial ==
Coin Master's main revenue comes from in-app purchases and microtransactions. The app made $59.15 million USD worldwide in July 2023 data. The application has now generated more than 3.5 billion US dollars in player spending over its lifetime. The US, UK, and Germany are the top spenders, contributing over 85% of its net revenue.

Specific data on in-app purchase conversion rates or average spending per player is limited.

According to the website OMR, Moon Active earned US$280 million until October 2019.

== Investors ==
The company has investors from the tech industry, such as Insight Partners.

== Advertisements ==
Jennifer Lopez, Khloé Kardashian, Eugenio Derbez, Kris Jenner, and Scott Disick have featured in advertisements for Coin Master. Other celebrities who have participated in advertisements for the game are Ben Higgins, Chris Harrison, Rae Sremmurd, Terry Crews, Emily Ratajkowski, Cardi B, Joan Collins, David Schwimmer, Dieter Bohlen, the Spice Girls, Thalía, and Chayanne.

== Awards ==
Coin Master was ranked in the top 20 of the acclaimed Top 50 Developers/Top 50 Mobile Game Makers list from PocketGamer.biz, published October 1, 2019. The game has also received countless mentions in industry publications regarding its continuous stance of 1st place in the weekly/monthly roundup lists of Top Grossing games on both the App Store and Google Play in 2019.

== Criticism ==
Coin Master has been criticized for using designs and characters resembling games such as Township in order to supposedly lure players into spending real-life currency on items and mechanics within the game.

In Germany, the State Media Authority of North Rhine-Westphalia, in collaboration with the Commission for the Protection of Minors in the Media (also known as the KJM or Kommission für Jugendmedienschutz), filed a lawsuit against Moon Active. The focus of the legal proceedings was to determine that the game, in its existing version, could no longer be distributed within Germany. These proceedings were formally concluded on Friday, April 3, 2020. The resolution was facilitated by the substantial cooperation of the app's operator in adhering to German youth protection standards. The modifications implemented by Moon Active included the introduction of double age verification and the restriction of minors from accessing the app. Additionally, the app now features a clear instruction on how to disable in-app purchases. This case is notable for being the first instance in which a German media authority took legal action against a developer located outside of Europe.
