= Bingo Blitz =

2012 video game

- Developer: Playtika
- Publisher: Playtika
- Platforms: Facebook, iOS, iPadOS, Android, Kindle, Windows
- Release: August 2012
- Genre: Social network game

Bingo Blitz is a freemium online board and card game released by Playtika in August 2012. It is available for Facebook, iOS, Android, and Microsoft Windows.

== History ==
Bingo Blitz was initially developed for Facebook in 2010 in Santa Monica, California by Buffalo Studios. By 2011, Bingo Blitz had over 1 million active monthly players, and was the top rated online bingo game on Facebook and one of the top 10 most popular games on Facebook. Buffalo Studios was acquired by Caesars Entertainment in 2011, for nearly $100 million. Caesars Entertainment, which purchased Playtika in 2011, moved the game to be managed by Playtika in 2012 and it was published on IOS and Android. In 2014, Bingo Blitz entered Facebook's Hall of Fame Games.

Bingo Blitz is one of the 100 top-grossing mobile games on Apple and Android devices, and as of 2021, Bingo Blitz was the top-grossing board game app in the United States on the App Store and Google Play.

== Gameplay ==
In the game, each player picks a virtual room, and the play passes through multiple cities around the world. Players compete in an online bingo match when each game combines cases and stories related to the country in which players are located. To start playing you will need to choose a city in which you want to play (doesn't have to be your location) and then you will be entered into a bingo room in that city. The bingo cards at Bingo Blitz are made up of 24 random numbers across five rows and columns. When the game begins you need to keep an eye out for your numbers to appear so you can cross them off your card. To call bingo depends on what the winning pattern is for that particular round.

The winning patterns in the game are a vertical, horizontal or a diagonal line, or all four corners. Bingo Blitz contains Power-Ups that help you reach a bingo. The cards also contain Bonus Squares that award you with additional in-game prizes when you manage to mark them off. A full game of Bingo Blitz could have anywhere between 10 and 15 rounds. The players need to use credits to buy more than one bingo card per round to amp up their chances of getting bingo. Generally the type of bingo on offer is the classic 75-ball bingo, but there are other types that crop up with the changing seasons.

=== Game rooms and events ===
Map rooms are the main rooms, in which players travel across cities on the world map and play online bingo matches, where they can earn various elements. Once the players combine all of the required elements that are related to that city, they move on to the next city. Additionally, there are seasonal rooms that change theme every other week. Every week, Bingo Blitz creates a different event that usually relates to holidays or special occasions, allowing players to collect special elements.

== Donations ==
In April 2020, Bingo Blitz donated one million meals for people affected by the COVID-19 pandemic in the United States. The meals were provided by the charity Feeding America. 10 meals were donated for every virtual meal prepared by Bingo Blitz players through playing the game.

== Game show ==
Bingo Blitz
- Genre: Game show
- Based on: Bingo Blitz
- Directed by: Stacie Saugen
- Presented by: Valerie Bertinelli
- Country of origin: United States
- Original language: English
- No. of series: 1
- No. of episodes: 40

Production
- Executive producers: Nimrod Harel; Rane Laymance; Roy Even Tov; Yaron Yashinski
- Running time: 20 minutes
- Production companies: GameChanger; Playtika; Game Show Enterprises

Original release
- Network: Game Show Network
- Release: April 14 – June 16, 2025

In December 2024, Game Show Network announced that Valerie Bertinelli would host a new game show based on the popular mobile game, which premiered on April 14, 2025.
