= Hinduja =

Hinduja is a Sindhi surname found in India and Pakistan. Notable people with the name include:

- Dheeraj Hinduja
- Gopichand Hinduja
- Indira Hinduja
- Karam Hinduja
- Parmanand Hinduja
- Prakash Hinduja
- S. P. Hinduja
- Sunny Hinduja

== See also ==
- Hinduja Group
