= Hinduja Healthcare Limited =

Private Hospital in India

- Industry: Healthcare
- Founder: Parmanand Hinduja
- Headquarters: Mumbai, India
- Key people: Gautam Khanna
- Parent: Hinduja Group
- Website: Official website

Hinduja Healthcare Limited is a business vertical and philanthropic arm of London-based Hinduja Group. It owns and operates the Hinduja Hospital and Hinduja Healthcare Surgical, both located in Mumbai. Its chief executive officer (CEO) is Gautam Khanna.

It has plans to expand its nationwide capacity to 5,000 beds, besides setting up radiology and pathology diagnostic centres, emergency ambulance services and pharmacy retail outlets across India.

It has forayed in to drug manufacturing and healthcare-related speciality chemicals manufacturing. It is also working with the Biomedical Engineering and Technology (incubation) Centre (BETiC) of IIT Bombay to co-develop and commercialise biomedical devices.

It has strategic partnerships with King's College London, Guy's and St Thomas' NHS Foundation Trust, Geneva University Hospitals, Stanford University, Henry Ford Health Systems to advance training, education and research.

== Hospitals ==
Hinduja Hospitals
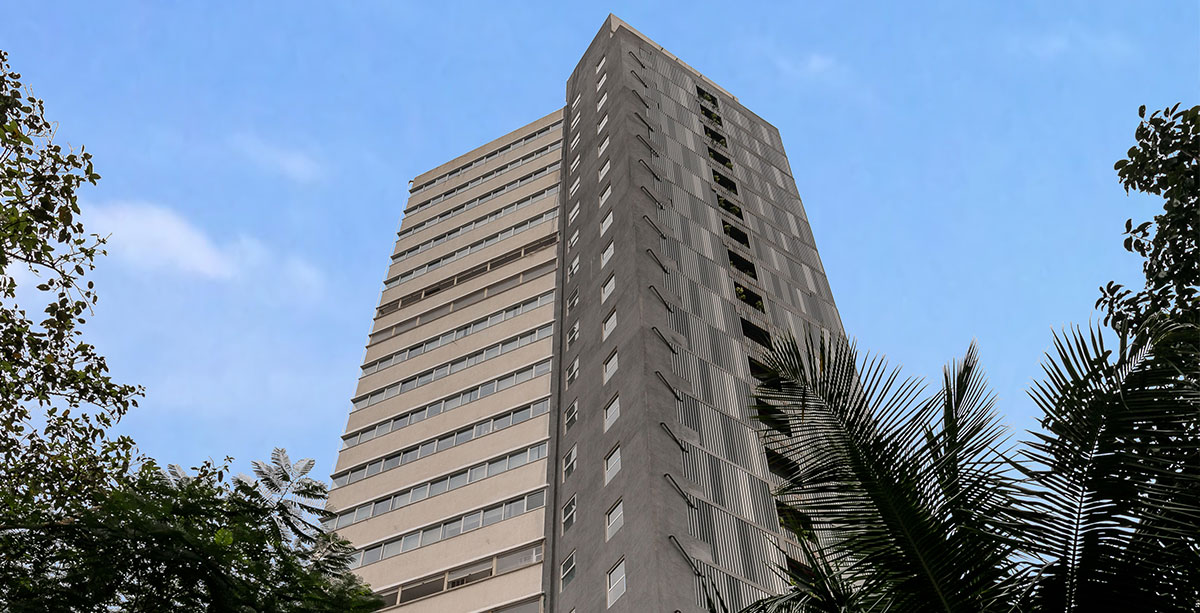
P. D. Hinduja Hospital's LG -1 building

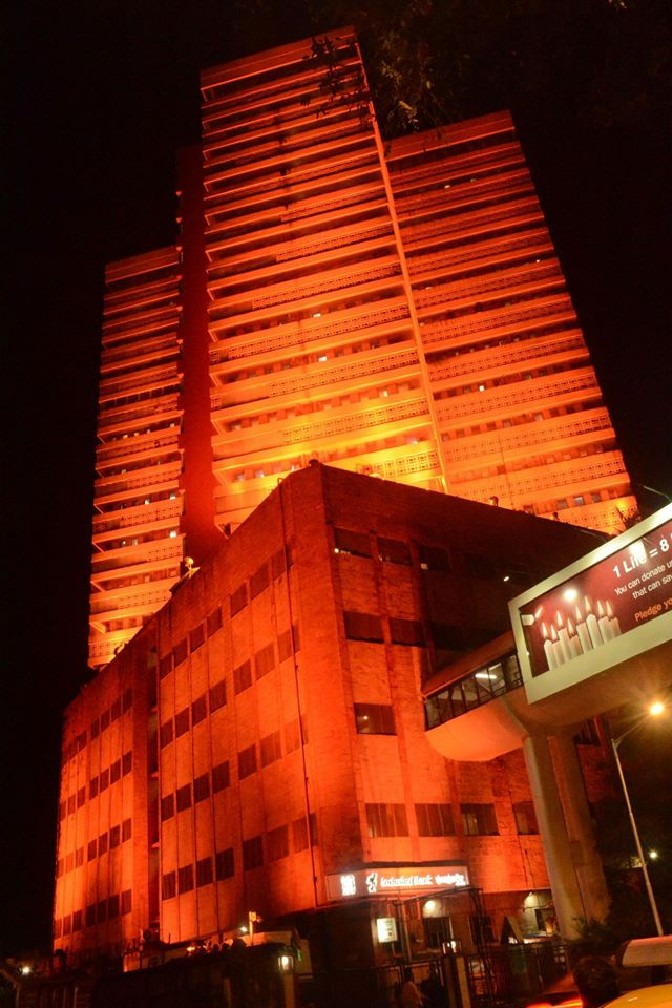
P. D. Hinduja Hospital's IPD building

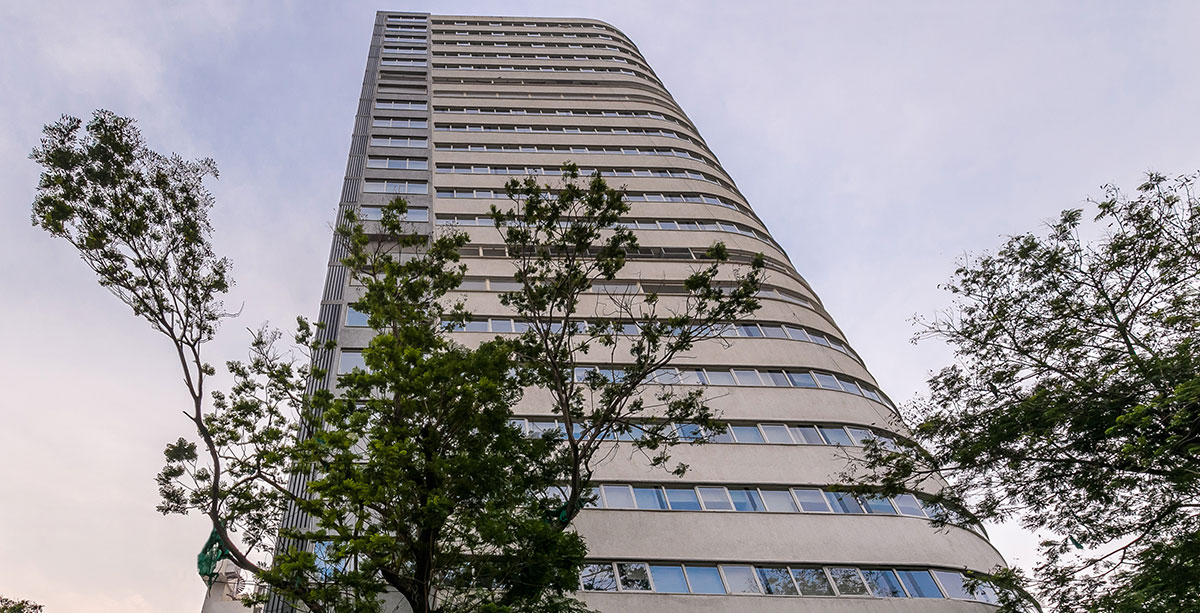
P. D. Hinduja Hospital's LG-2 building

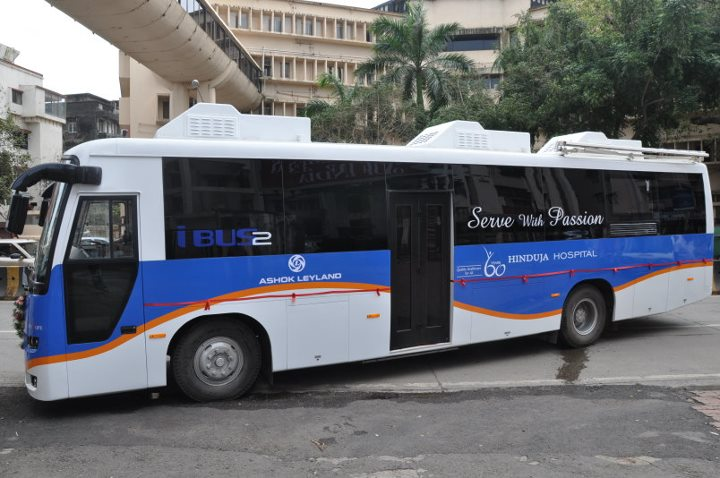
Hinduja Hospital's mobile clinic

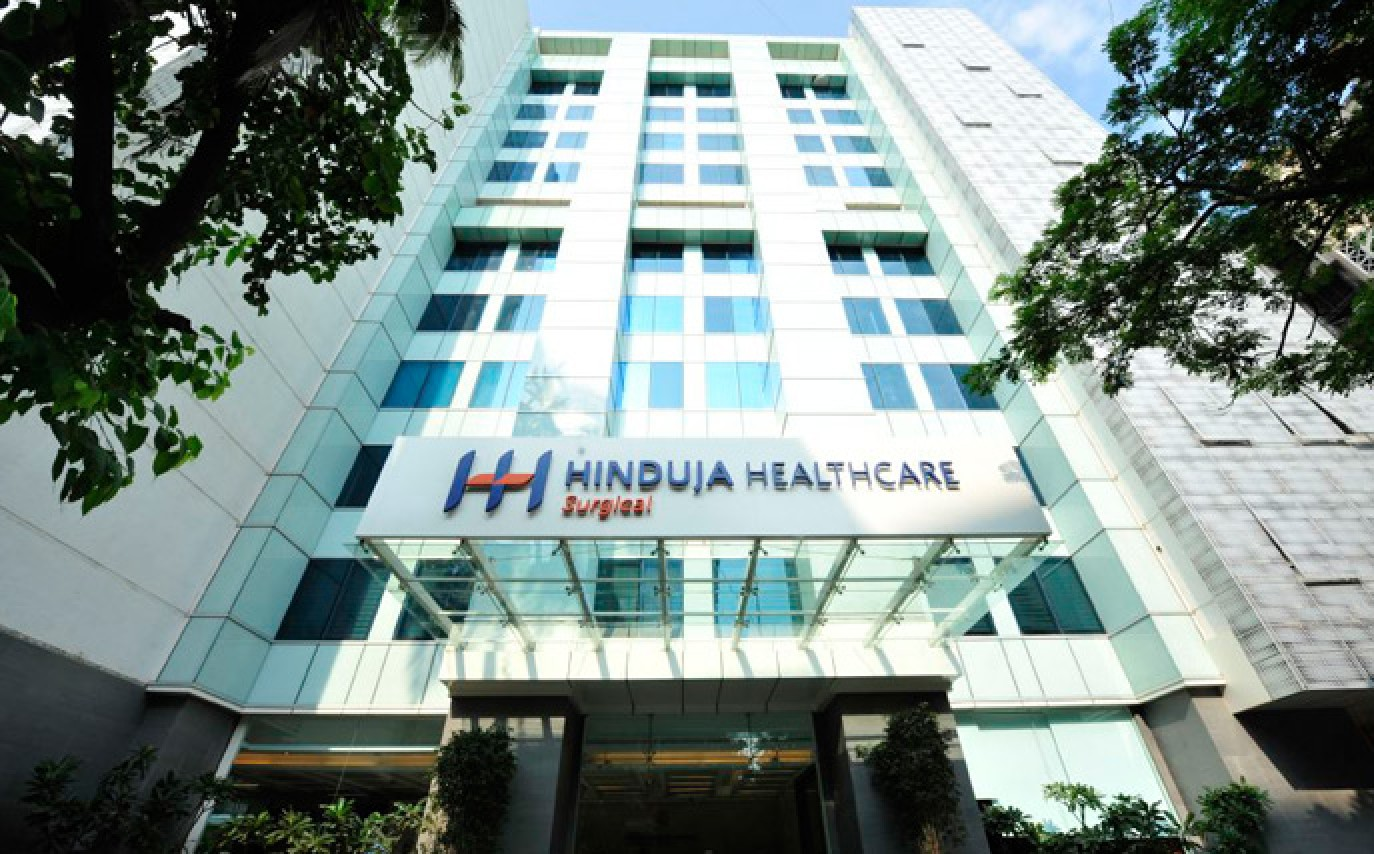
Hinduja Healthcare Surgical, Khar

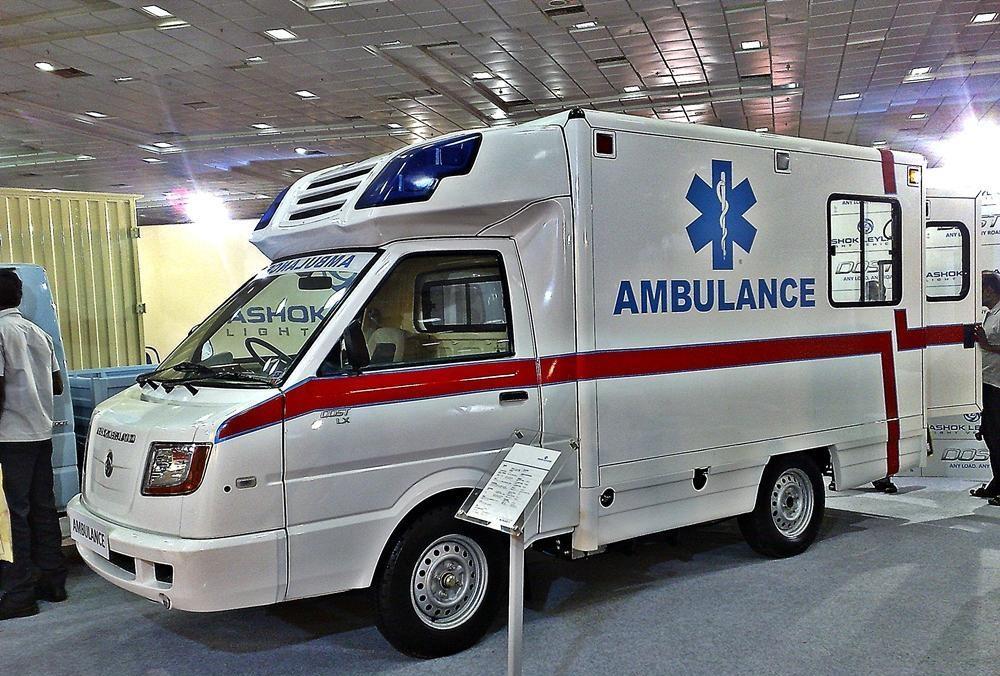
Ambulance based on Ashok Leyland Dost shows synergy between the conglomerate's companies

== Notable doctors ==
- B. K. Misra – Neurosurgeon
- Farhad Kapadia – Critical care medicine
- Gustad Daver – Cardio-thoracic, vascular and transplant surgeon
- Indira Hinduja – Gynaecologist
- Luis Jose De Souza – Surgical oncologist
- Milind Vasant Kirtane – Otorhinolaryngologist
- Rasik Shah – Paediatric surgeon & Urologist
- Sanjay Agarwala – Orthopaedic surgeon
- Sultan Pradhan – Surgical oncologist
- Suresh Advani – Medical oncologist
- Tehemton Erach Udwadia – Gastroenterologist
- Zarir Udwadia – Pulmonologist
