= Ekam Eco Solutions =

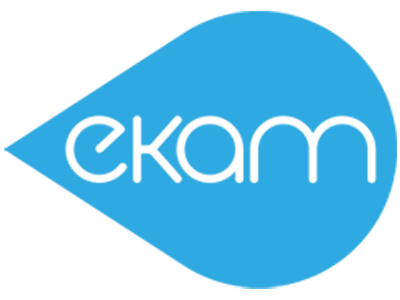
- Company type: Privately held
- Industry: Technology
- Genre: Sanitation, Environment
- Founded: May 2013
- Founder: Uttam Banerjee; Vijayaraghavan Chariar
- Headquarters: New Delhi, India
- Key people: Uttam Banerjee; Vijayaraghavan Chariar; Sachin Joshi
- Products: Zerodor Waterless Urinals; Care Natural Home Cleaning Solutions; Women's Urinal; Nutrient Recovery Reactors; Light weight and Sustainable structures
- Brands: Zerodor, Zerodor CARE
- Services: Training and awareness creation on Sanitation, Water, Health and Hygiene
- Website: www.ekameco.com

Ekam Eco Solutions is an Indian startup company that markets products related to ecological sanitation and sustainable living. The company is best known for its Zerodor waterless urinal technology and CARE Natural Housekeeping & Home Care Solutions.

== History ==
Ekam Eco Solutions was founded in May 2013 by Uttam Banerjee, an alumnus of IIT Delhi, and Vijayaraghavan Chariar, Professor at the IIT Delhi Centre for Rural Development. It was incubated at IIT Delhi.

=== Zerodor Waterless Urinal Technology ===
Chariar, Ramesh Sakthivel, and Banerjee developed a mechanism which attaches to existing urinal bowls, allowing the urinals to operate without flushing and to release less odour than a conventional urinal. This eliminates the need for about 100,000 litres of fresh water per year for each public urinal, resulting in a corresponding reduction in water bills and lower sewage volumes.

Ekam began selling its first product in October 2013. It is called "Zerodor", both because urinals fitted with the technology produce little odour, but also because the product requires no replaceable parts or consumable chemicals. When retrofitted to existing urinal pans it is an inexpensive way to improve urinals in institutions and public spaces.

Because the resulting urine is not diluted, it can more easily be collected for use as organic fertilizer for plants.

The company has more than 7,000 installations as of 2016.

That Zerodor is a mechanical system and does not have any consumables makes it more suitable as a waterless urinal system compared to other mechanisms in the market where there are recurring costs involved.

=== CARE - Natural Home Care Solutions ===
Care is a product line of cleaning and deodorizing solutions that are non-toxic, biodegradable, safe and free of harmful chemicals.

List of available solutions under the brand:

1. Toilet Cleaner
2. Floor Cleaner
3. Multi Purpose Cleaner
4. Drain Cleaners
5. Sewage Treatment Solutions (for STP and Septic Tanks)
6. Water Based Fresheners
7. Food Waste Composting Solutions

== Awards and recognition ==
- Titan Design Impact Awards 2018
- Sewage Treatment Products recognized and approved by Ministry of Jal Shakti headed by Dr. Mashelkar Committee
- Millennium Alliance Award 2014 in the field of Water and Sanitation.
- Winner of DST – Lockheed Martin India Innovation Growth Program 2014.
