= Karam Hinduja =

British Indian investment banker

- Education: Columbia University (BA)
- Occupations: CEO, Hinduja Bank
- Parent: Shanu Hinduja
- Relatives: S. P. Hinduja (grandfather); Parmanand Hinduja (great-grandfather)

Karam Hinduja is a British Indian investment banker who is the CEO of Hinduja Bank.

== Biography ==
Hinduja is a grandson of Indian-born British billionaire businessman S. P. Hinduja, founder of the Hinduja Group and patriarch of the Hinduja family. He grew up in London. His mother is Shanu Hinduja, the elder of S.P.'s two daughters, who is the chair of the Hinduja Foundation US and co-chairperson of Hinduja Global Solutions Inc. His father is Suren Mukhi, son of Narsi and Janki Mukhi of a Sindhi trading family based in London.

He received his B.A. from Columbia University. He also spent a year at Nick Bollettieri's IMG Academy in Florida in a bid to become a professional tennis player before a herniated disc forced him to return to Europe to join the family business.

He took charge of the Hinduja Bank in early 2020 and led a rebranding effort, renaming Hinduja Bank into SP Hinduja Banque Privee, a move he claims is meant to honor his grandfather, who founded the bank in 1978. He also signaled a shift in the bank's management strategy in attracting a younger and tech-oriented clientele.

Hinduja is also the CEO and founder of Timeless Media and digital media platform Karma Network that promotes alternative investing principles. He has criticized the British government for failing to act on climate change and has called on businesses to step up their commitment to environmental sustainability.
