= BETiC =

Biomedical Engineering and Technology Innovation Centre
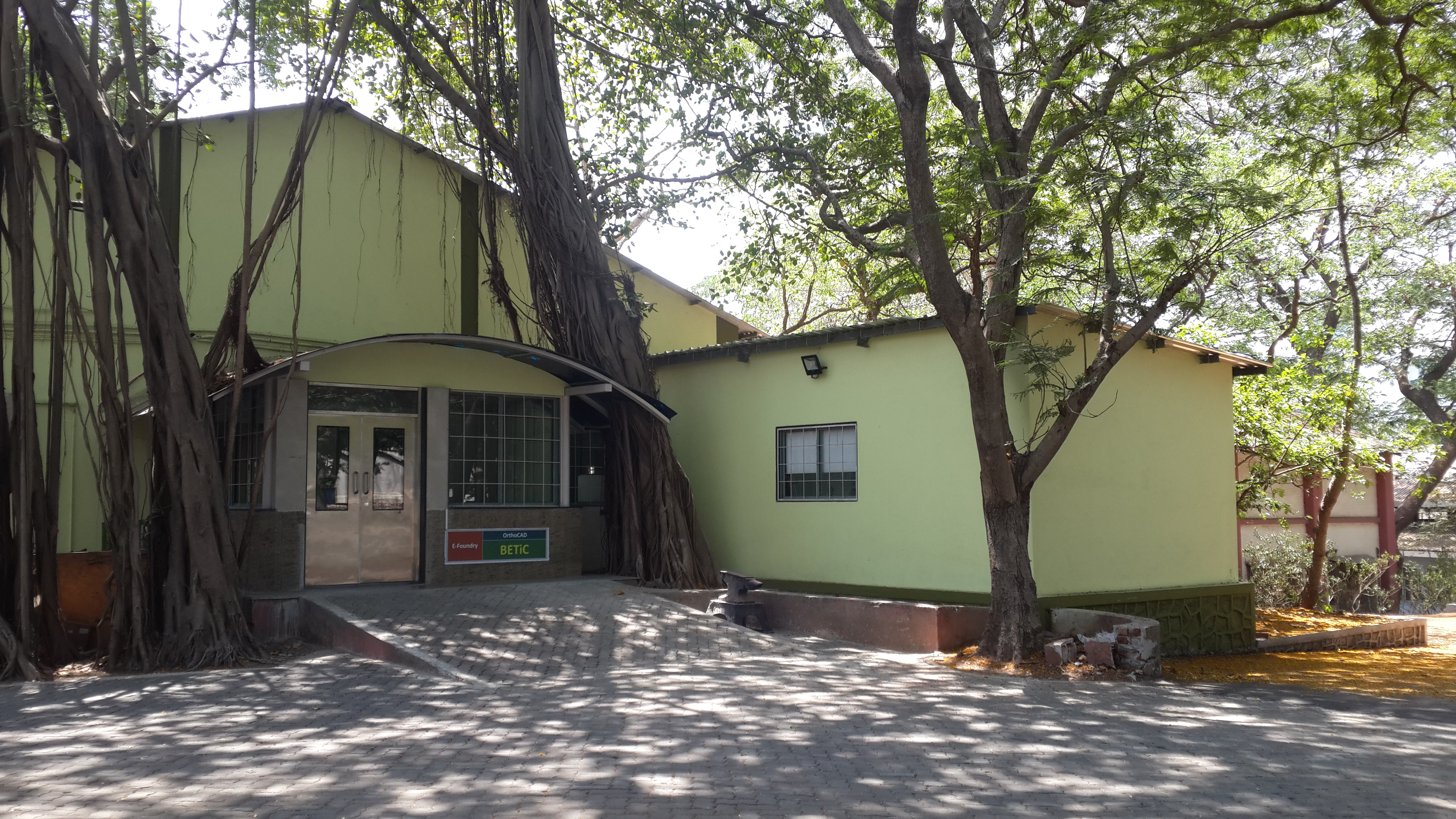
- BETIC Lab at IIT Bombay
- Abbreviation: BETIC
- Established: 2014
- Location: IIT Bombay, Mumbai, India
- Website: betic.org

BETIC (Biomedical Engineering and Technology Innovation Centre) based at Indian Institute of Technology Bombay is an inter-disciplinary multi-institution initiative for medical device innovation. Established in 2014 with support from the government of Maharashtra, it comprises a network of 14 engineering and medical institutes across the state. The BETIC team have developed 50 medical devices as of 2019, and licensed 20 of them to startup companies or industry for mass production.

== History ==
BETIC has its origins in a study conducted by Maharashtra University of Health Sciences, which concluded with a brainstorming meeting at Sahyadri Guest House, Mumbai in Dec 2009. This was attended by about 25 representatives of government, academia and medical community, who unanimously recommended setting up a center for indigenous development of affordable medical devices.

The study was funded by Rajiv Gandhi Science & Technology Commission, government of Maharashtra. Its chairperson Dr. Anil Kakodkar invited IIT Bombay to develop a proposal for incubating a biomedical engineering and technology center based on hub-and-spoke model. This was approved in April 2014 as a five-year project, with a mandate to develop 12 different medical devices and train 50 innovators. BETIC started functioning from OrthoCAD lab in IIT Bombay in early 2015, followed by two satellite centers established at Visvesvaraya National Institute of Technology, Nagpur and College of Engineering, Pune.

In the next three years (2016-2018), another four engineering institutes and four medical institutes set up self-funded BETIC cells in collaboration with the first three centers. The Medical Education and Drug Department of Maharashtra approached IIT Bombay to set up three more BETIC cells in government hospitals; this agreement was exchanged in the presence of Chief Minister of Maharashtra, Devendra Fadanavis in February 2019 at Sahyadri guest house, the same place where the first meeting took place ten years earlier. Andhra Pradesh Med Tech Zone, Visakhapatnam and Gujarat Technological University, Ahmedabad also signed agreements with IIT Bombay for collaboration with BETIC.

At the 5th annual review, symposium and expo of BETIC held at IIT Bombay on 12–13 April 2019, over 100 stakeholders representing the government, academia, medical community, startups, industry and investors discussed how to sustain, replicate and scale up the healthcare innovation eco-system.

== Centers and key people ==
BETIC network comprises one main center, two satellite centers, four cells in engineering institutes and seven cells in medical institutes. The centers and their respective founders are listed here.

=== Main center ===
- Indian Institute of Technology Bombay, Mumbai (Prof. Bhallamudi Ravi)

The center has facilities for 3D scanning, CAD/CAM, 3D printing in biocompatible plastic and metal, printed circuit board design and fabrication, and basic mechanical testing. It is managed by Dr. Bhanupratap Gaur, Senior Research Scientist.

=== Satellite centers ===
- College of Engineering, Shivajinagar, Pune (Prof. B.B. Ahuja)
- Visvesvaraya National Institute of Technology, Nagpur (Prof. A.M. Kuthe)

=== Engineering institute cells ===
- KJ Somaiya College of Engineering, Mumbai (Dr. Ramesh Lekurwale)
- MIT Art, Design & Technology University, Pune (Dr. Renu Vyas)
- Symbiosis International University, Lavale, Pune (Dr. Nishant Tikekar)
- G.H. Raisoni College of Engineering, Nagpur (Dr. Vibha Bora)

=== Medical institute cells ===
- P.D. Hinduja National Hospital and Medical Research Centre, Mumbai (Manish Agarwal and B. K. Misra)
- Grant Govt. Medical College & JJ Hospital, Mumbai (Dr. Neetin Mahajanl)
- Haffkine Institute of Training, Research & Testing, Mumbai (Dr. Nishigandha Naik)
- MGM Institute of Health Sciences, Navi Mumbai (Dr. Rajani Mullerpatan)
- B.J. Medical College & Sassoon Hospital, Pune (Dr. Sanjay Gaikwad)
- Datta Meghe Institute of Medical Sciences, Wardha (Dr. Punit Fulzele)
- BKL Walwalkar Rural Hospital, Dervan, Chiplun (Dr. Suvarna Patil)

== Innovation process ==
BETIC uses a collaborative innovation model comprising four stages: defining an unmet clinical need where doctors play a critical role, developing a novel solution by researchers, delivering a well-tested product by entrepreneurs, and deploying it in clinical practice supported by investors. The goal is to take new ideas through invention and innovation to impact. This process is referred to as 'bedside to bench to business to bedside', enabling affordable, effective, reliable and suitable products for healthcare in India and other developing countries using a frugal innovation process.

The Centre organizes Medical Device Hackathon (MEDHA) during weekends in July, and week-long Medical Device Innovation Camp (MEDIC) in September. Participants include final year students, entrepreneurs, working professionals, teachers and incubation managers. Inter-disciplinary teams of four people are formed, one each from medical, design, electronics and mechanical backgrounds. They select problems from a curated list prepared in consultation with hospitals, evolve novel solution concepts, fabricate proof-of-concepts, and present them to a jury panel. Eight MEDHA and five MEDIC organized during 2015-2019 had more than 700 participants in total. Several winners joined BETIC full-time for developing and commercializing the products; most of them incubated startup companies.

The innovation process of BETIC received ISO 13485 certification of quality management system for medical devices, in 2018.

== Products and partners ==
Medical devices developed by BETIC researchers span different medical specialties and risk classes, including medical diagnosis devices, surgical instruments, implants and prostheses. Sixteen products were licensed to startup companies incubated by the innovators, and six were developed for industry partners.

=== Startup venture products ===
- Orthopedic surgery planner - AlgoSurg Products (Dr. Vikas Karade)
- Smart stethoscope module - Ayu Devices (Adarsha K, Tapas Pandey)
- Diabetic foot screener - Ayati Devices (Nishant Kathpal)
- Stance-controlled knee ankle foot orthosis - Aumeesh Tech (Aneesh Karma)
- Flexible burr - Aur Innovations (Dr Roshan Sakharkar)
- Endo-tracheal blockage detector - Atmen Technovention (Kishor Khandare)
- Menstrual cup - Care Form Labs (Pramod Priya Ranjan)
- Automatic suturing - Denovo Bioinnovations (Dr. Nikhil Mamoria)
- Patient-specific bone scaffolds - Lucid Implants (Pranav Sapkal)
- Hybrid plaster splint - MediAsha Technologies (Mayur Sanas)
- Burn patient isolation unit - Medgyor (Dinoj Joseph)
- Artificial temporal bone - Nu Ossa Mediquip (Piyush Ukey)
- Glaucoma screener - OKO Icare Solutions (Neha Lande)
- Skin spray gun - Pacify Medical (Saiprasad Poyarekar)
- Maxillofacial surgery guides - Precisurg (Sandeep Dahake)
- Jaw relation recorder - Prosthocentric (Dr. Jayant Palaskar)

=== Industry partner products ===
- Clubfoot brace monitor - Metwiz Materials (Lokap Sahu)
- Multi-use biopsy gun - Tenon Meditech (Jaydip Deshpande)
- Laparoscopy instrument - Eclipse Instrumentation (Priyal Nagare)
- Nasal osteotomy forceps - Om Surgicals (Rashmikant Gangar)
- Above knee prosthetic leg - Ratna Nidhi Charitable Trust (Rajiv Mehta)
- ICU ventilator - Innovations Healthcare (Gaurav Agarwal)

== Awards ==
Biotechnology Ignition Grant (BIG) instituted by Biotechnology Industry Research Assistance Council, under the Ministry of Science and Technology, Delhi, was won 16 times by BETIC innovators, to kickstart their startup ventures. Other awards include Gandhian Young Technological Award (twice), DST India Innovation Growth Programme Medal (thrice), Google Impact Challenge for Disabilities Award, Dr. Albert Schweitzer International Health Award, Dr. B.C. Roy International Award, Emerging Startup of the Year, American Bazaar StartUp Competition, Young Entrepreneur Award, Indo-Swiss AIT, SICOT Research Award, SKB Seva Samaj Award, Maharashtra Startup Week, Maharashtra AI Innovation Challenge Award, NCPEDP-Mphasis Universal Design Award, IET IOT Challenge Award - Healthcare track, and Infosys Aarohan.
