= Milind Vasant Kirtane =

Indian otorhinolaryngologist, Padma Shri recipient

- Born: India
- Occupation: Otorhinolaryngologist
- Awards: Padma Shri; B. C. Roy Award; Qimpro Award

Milind Vasant Kirtane is an Indian otorhinolaryngologist, reported to have performed the first cochlear implant surgery in Mumbai. The Government of India honoured him, in 2014, with the award of Padma Shri, the fourth highest civilian award, for his contributions to the field of medicine.

== Biography ==
Milind Vasant Kirtane, a Maharashtrian by birth, secured a master's degree (MS) in Otorhinolaryngology from King Edward Memorial Hospital and Seth Gordhandas Sunderdas Medical College, where he is an honorary surgeon and professor emeritus. He specializes in cochlear implants, endoscopic sinus surgery, and neurotology. He is a Consultant ENT surgeon at various hospitals such as Breach Candy Hospital, Safaiee Hospital and P.D. Hinduja National Hospital and Medical Research Centre in Mumbai. He has performed over 2300 cochlear implant surgeries. He is credited with the first cochlear implant surgery in Mumbai.

Kirtane, a 2005 winner of the B. C. Roy Award from the Government of India, and an elected fellow of the National Academy of Medical Sciences, holds many position of importance. He is the founder President of the Sinus Endoscopic Society of India and one of the founders of the Indian Society of Otology and the Indian Society of Laryngology. He is a member and a former President of the Association of Otolaryngologists of India. Kirtane was the first person from India to be elected to the Barany Society, Sweden (1983) and holds memberships in the Neurotological and Equilibriometric Society of India, 4-G Forschung, Germany and American Rhinologic Society. He sits in the editorial boards of Neurotological and Equilibriometric Society International, International Tinnitus Journal, ISRN Otolaryngology and Archives for Sensology and Neurootology in Science and Practice (ASN)

Kirtane is reported to be active in social activities, and is credited with several articles, over 50 of them, and books on otology, neurotology and endoscopic sinus surgery.

== Publications ==
- Milind V. Kirtane (Editor), Christopher De Souza (Editor), Mario Sanna (Editor), Anand K. Devaiah (Editor) (2013). Otology and Neurotology (Otorhinolaryngology - Head and Neck Surgery). Thieme. ISBN 978-9382076001.
- Suresh D. Isloor (Editor), Milind V. Kirtane (Foreword) (2014). Lacrimal Drainage Surgery. JP Medical. ISBN 978-9350906507.
- Bachi T. Hathiram (Editor), Vicki S. Khattar (Editor), Jatin P. Shah (Foreword), Milind V. Kirtane (Foreword) (2013). Atlas of Operative Otorhinolaryngology and Head & Neck Surgery. JP Medical. p. 1653. ISBN 978-9351522973.
- V. Anqand (Author), Milind V. Kirtane (Foreword), Ravi Nayar (Foreword) (2011). ENT, Head and Neck Diseases Made Easy. JP Medical. p. 160. ISBN 978-8184485950.
- Claus-Frenz Claussen (Author), Milind V. Kirtane (Editor) (1991). Vertigo, Nausea, Tinnitus, and Hypoacusia Due to Head and Neck Trauma: Proceedings of the Xviith Scientific Meeting of the Neurootological and Equil (International Congress Series). Excerpta Medica. ISBN 978-0444811509.
- Claus-Frenz Claussen (Author), Milind V. Kirtane (Author), Klaus Schlitter (Author) (1988). Vertigo, Nausea, Tinnitus, and Hypoacusia in Metabolic Disorders: Proceedings (International Congress Series). Excerpta Medica. ISBN 978-0444810243.
- Milind V Kirtane (1982). Electronystagmography: A Systematic Approach. ASIN B001A1MHR2.
