= Prakash Hinduja =

Shikarpur born Swiss businessman (born 1945)

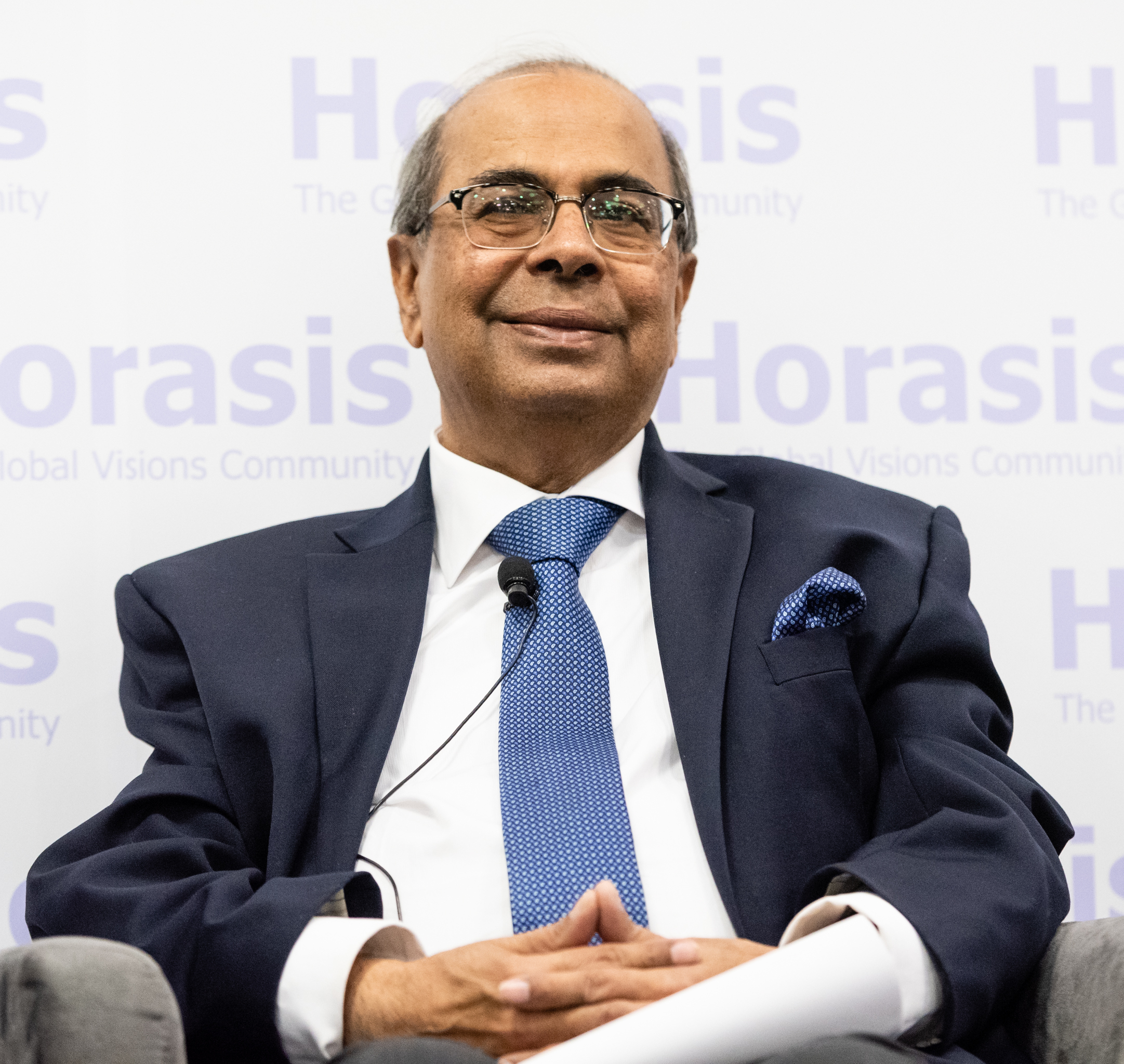
- Hinduja in 2019
- Born: June 1945 (age 81)
- Occupations: Chairman, Hinduja Group in Europe
- Spouse: Kamal Hinduja
- Children: 3
- Parent(s): Parmanand Deepchand Hinduja; Jamuna Parmanand Hinduja
- Relatives: S. P. Hinduja and Gopichand Hinduja (brothers); Dheeraj Hinduja (nephew)

Prakash Parmanand Hinduja (born June 1945) is an Indian businessman whose family is originally from the Sindh region. He is the chairman of the Hinduja Group in Europe, with residences in the United Kingdom, Switzerland, and the United Arab Emirates.

As a business owner, his net worth as of 2024 is £37 billion, making him one of Britain's richest people. His wealth comes from interests such as oil, gas, and banking, as well as owning the Raffles London at The OWO.

In June 2024, Hinduja, his wife, son, and daughter-in-law were sentenced to 4–4.5 years in jail for exploiting their domestic staff.

== Early life ==
Prakash Parmanand Hinduja was born in June 1945, the son of Parmanand Hinduja, and educated at university. He is of Sindhi origin.

Starting out in Tehran, Iran, Prakash Hinduja soon moved to Geneva to look after the company’s Europe branch. He has been based in Monaco since 2008 and presently, is the chairman of Hinduja Group (Europe).

== Criminal charges ==
In 2021, Hinduja was investigated for tax evasion, human trafficking, and residency fraud in Switzerland. He was ordered by the Federal Supreme Court of Switzerland to pay CHF 125 million as financial collateral.

== Human trafficking charges ==
The Hinduja family was accused of exploiting Indian staff in their mansion while cultivating a "climate of fear". For medical reasons, Prakash and his wife Kamal were unable to attend the proceedings that took place in a Geneva criminal court, staying back in Dubai. On 21 June 2024, Prakash, Kamal, their son Ajay, and daughter-in-law Namrata were sentenced to 4 to 4.5 years in jail for exploiting their domestic workers but were acquitted of more serious charges of human trafficking.

== Personal life ==
He is married to Kamal Hinduja, they live in Monaco, and have two sons, Ajay and Ramkrishan, and a daughter, Renuka.

Prakash and his three brothers are teetotal and vegetarian.

The family of Kamal and Prakash Hinduja have a residence in Switzerland, in the village of Cologny on Lake Geneva.
