= Gopichand Hinduja =

Indian businessman (1940–2025)

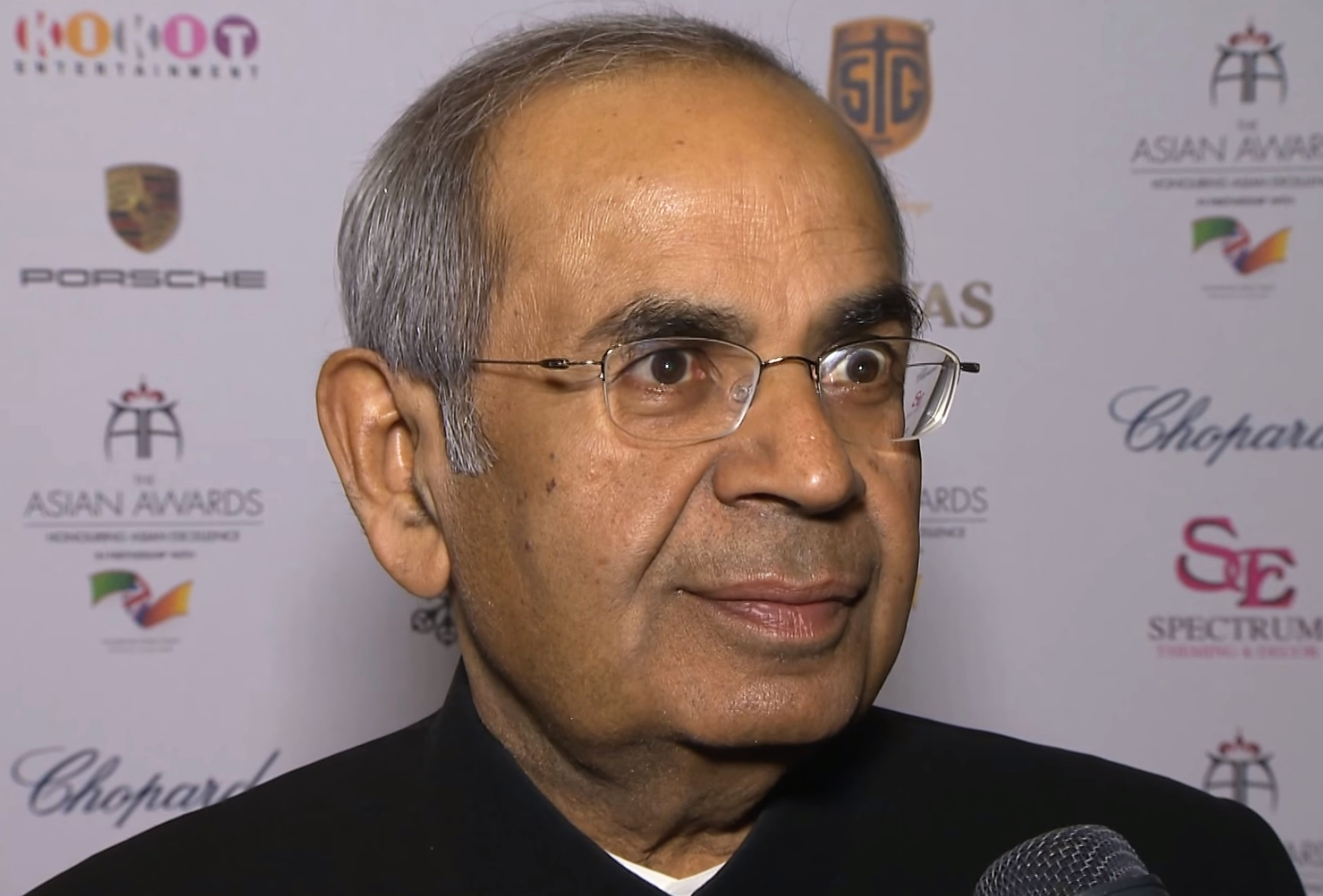
- Hinduja in 2019
- Born: Gopichand Parmanand Hinduja; 29 February 1940; Iran
- Died: 4 November 2025 (aged 85); London, England
- Education: Jai Hind College
- Known for: Co-Chairman, Hinduja Group
- Spouse: Sunita Hinduja
- Children: 3, including Dheeraj Hinduja
- Father: Parmanand Deepchand Hinduja
- Relatives: S. P. Hinduja (brother); Prakash Hinduja (brother)

Gopichand Parmanand Hinduja (29 February 1940 – 4 November 2025) was an Indian-British billionaire businessman controlling the Indian conglomerate Hinduja Group. For many years he was co-chairman with his brother Srichand "S. P." Hinduja who died in May 2023. He and his brother were frequently named among the wealthiest people in the UK and Asia, and in the Sunday Times Rich List 2024 ranking of the wealthiest people in the UK he was placed first with an estimated family fortune of £37 billion.

== Early life ==
Gopichand Parmanand Hinduja was born on 29 February 1940, in Iran, the son of Parmanand Hinduja, and educated at Jai Hind College, Bombay.

== Business career ==
The Hinduja brothers began their careers in their father's textile and trading businesses in Bombay, India, and Tehran, Iran. Successful early businesses included the sale of food commodities (onions and potatoes) and iron ore from India to Iran.

With the acquisition of Ashok Leyland (from British Leyland) and Gulf Oil (from Chevron Corporation) in the 1980s and the establishment of banks in Switzerland and India in the 1990s, Hinduja Group became one of India's best known businesses alongside such names as Tata, Birla, and Ambani. In 2012, the Group acquired the US firm Houghton International, the world's largest metal fluids manufacturer, for $1.045 billion, forming a consortium with the help of Ghouse Mohammed Asif, (Director of Private Equity of JP Morgan) and Hank Paulson, former United States Secretary of the Treasury and formerly of Goldman Sachs.

== Wealth ==
As of May 2024, he was estimated to be the UK's richest person. Since the 1990s, he had been consistently ranked among the UK and Asia's wealthiest people.

In 2013, a rich list compiled by Asian Media & Marketing Group, estimated Hinduja's wealth at GBP 19 billion ($24.7 billion).

In May 2017, Hinduja topped the Sunday Times Rich List with an estimated wealth of GBP 16.2 billion ($21 billion).

In May 2019 The Hinduja brothers, Gopichand and Srichand, were once again named by The Times UK as the UK's wealthiest people, according to the annual Sunday Times Rich List survey.

Hinduja remained the wealthiest again in 2025, with his estimated wealth at £35.3 billion following a peak of £37.2 billion in 2024.

== Personal life ==
Gopichand Hinduja was married to Sunita, and they had two sons and one daughter, Sanjay Hinduja, Dheeraj Hinduja and Rita Hinduja. The Hinduja family is of Hindu Sindhi heritage. Gopichand and his three brothers are teetotal and vegetarian.

In 2015, their son Sanjay Hinduja married his long-time girlfriend, the designer Anu Mahtani, in Udaipur, India. The wedding cost £15 million and entertainment included the pop singers Jennifer Lopez, Nicole Scherzinger and actor Arjun Kapoor.

=== Citizenship ===
Gopichand obtained British citizenship in 1997. In 2001, Hinduja was involved in the UK's cash-for-passports scandal, where he donated money for the Millennium Dome while applying for British citizenship, leading to the resignation of Peter Mandelson.

=== Later life and death ===
The Hinduja family made headlines in 2021 for a feud that reached a London courtroom. Srichand Hinduja's daughters Vinoo and Shanu accused their three uncles of cutting them out of funding and decision-making. At the time, Srichand (Gopichand's elder brother) was suffering from dementia, and soon died in 2023.

Hinduja died at a hospital in London, on 4 November 2025, at the age of 85.
