= S. P. Hinduja =

Indian-born British businessman (1935–2023)

- Born: Srichand Parmanand Hinduja; 28 November 1935; Karachi, Sindh Province, British India
- Died: 17 May 2023 (aged 87); London, England
- Education: Davar's College of Commerce; R. D. National College
- Known for: Chairman, Hinduja Group
- Spouse: Madhu Hinduja (died 2023)
- Children: 3
- Parents: Parmanand Hinduja (father); Jamuna Parmanand Hinduja (mother)
- Relatives: Gopichand Hinduja (brother); Prakash Hinduja (brother); Karam Hinduja (grandson); Dheeraj Hinduja (nephew)

Srichand Parmanand Hinduja (28 November 1935 – 17 May 2023) was an Indian-born British billionaire businessman. He was the primary shareholder and chairman of Hinduja Group of companies, together with his brother Gopichand.

== Early life ==
Srichand Parmanand Hinduja was born on 28 November 1935 to Sindhi Hindu family in Karachi, Sindh province, British India. He was the second son of Parmanand Deepchand Hinduja and Jamuna Parmanand Hinduja. He was educated at Davar's College of Commerce and R. D. National College, both in Mumbai.

== Business career ==
Hinduja began his career in his father's textile and trading businesses in Bombay, India, and Tehran, Iran. His successful businesses in his early career included the sale of food commodities (onions and potatoes) and iron ore from India to Iran.

With the acquisition of Ashok Leyland (from British Leyland) and Gulf Oil (from Chevron) in the 1980s and the establishment of banks in Switzerland and India in the 1990s, Hinduja became one of India's best-known business tycoons alongside such names as Tata, Birla, and Ambani. In 2012, the Group acquired the US firm Houghton International, the world's largest metal fluids manufacturer, for $1.045 billion, forming a consortium with the help of Ghouse Mohammed Asif, (Director of Private Equity of JP Morgan) and Henry Paulson, former United States Secretary of the Treasury and formerly of Goldman Sachs.

Hinduja's business approach was conservative and opportunistic, investing in diversified business sectors ranging from oil and gas, banking and finance, and IT to real estate, energy and chemicals, power, and media and entertainment.

== Wealth ==
From the 1990s, he was consistently ranked among the UK and Asia's wealthiest people. The October 2013 issue of Forbes Life estimated the Hinduja home in London's Carlton House Terrace down the Mall from Buckingham Palace to be worth $500 million, making it the third most expensive private home in the world.

As of March 2019, Forbes ranked SP and GP Hinduja as the 65th richest in the world, with a net worth of $16.9 billion, with Forbes India estimating his net worth at $18 billion. This made him the 4th wealthiest Indian-origin business magnate in the world.

In 2022, Hinduja was the UK's wealthiest person, with an estimated wealth of £28.5 billion according to the Sunday Times Rich List. Based on the rich list compiled by Asian Media & Marketing Group, Hinduja's wealth is estimated at £25.2 billion (US$31.7 billion).

== Personal life ==
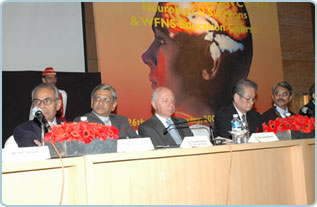
Hinduja at the 6th Asian Congress of Neurological Surgeons, organised by the Hinduja Hospital

Alongside his younger brothers Gopichand, Prakash and Ashok, Hinduja are known as the patriarch of India's "fab four".

Hinduja was married to Madhu Srichand Hinduja, and they had two daughters.

A daughter, Vinoo Srichand Hinduja, is on the board of management for the P. D. Hinduja National Hospital and Medical Research Centre in Mumbai.

On 19 May 1992, Dharam Hinduja, his youngest son, died a few days after receiving 70% burns from self-immolation in a hotel room in Mauritius, as part of a suicide pact with his wife, who survived. He had secretly married Ninotchka Sargon, a Roman Catholic Australian, at Chelsea Register Office in January that year.

In 2001, Hinduja was involved in the UK's "cash-for-passports" scandal, where he donated money for the Millennium Dome while applying for British citizenship, leading to the resignation of Peter Mandelson.

Hinduja was teetotal and a strict vegetarian. He was known to bring his own vegetarian food to the Queen's banquets at Buckingham Palace.

His wife, Madhu, died in January 2023. Hinduja died of complications of Lewy body dementia in London, on 17 May 2023, at age 87.
