= Zarir Udwadia =

Indian pulmonologist

Zarir Udwadia (born 1960) is an Indian pulmonologist and researcher. His work on drug resistant tuberculosis has led to improvements in India's National Tuberculosis Control Programme. Udwadia was the only Indian invited by the WHO to be part of the TB ‘Guidelines Group’, which formulated the 4th edition of the TB Guidelines, published in 2010. He was also the only doctor to be named among India's best strategists.

== Professional life ==
Udwadia is a graduate of the Grant Medical College, Mumbai. He spent five years training in the UK at various centres, including Brompton Hospital, London. He practices at the P.D. Hinduja National Hospital and Medical Research Centre and the Breach Candy Hospital, in Mumbai. Approximately 8,000 patients pass through his OPD annually. Udwadia established a Chest Medicine Department at the Hinduja Hospital in 1992, and the city’s first Sleep Laboratory in 1994. He serves on the editorial board of Thorax, a respiratory medicine journal, and has authored over 140 publications.

== Drug-Resistant tuberculosis ==
Udwadia runs a free weekly TB clinic at the Hinduja Hospital, which he set up in 1992, on his return to India, after his training in the UK. It is the busiest outpatient clinic at the Hinduja hospital, with patients traveling from many parts of the country, and some lining up overnight, to be seen by him.

In December 2011, Udwadia documented twelve cases of what he called totally drug-resistant ('TDR') TB, a strain of the disease that seemed to show resistance to all known treatments. There were only two other episodes of TDR-TB reported in the world before this- in Iran in 2009, and Italy in 2007. Along with his colleagues at the Hinduja Hospital, he published a letter describing four of these cases in the journal Clinical Infectious Diseases. The journal letter prompted extensive media attention. Government officials publicly denied the issue, accused him of wrongly spreading panic, and a Mumbai health official seized patient samples from his laboratory.

While the WHO eventually said that defining resistance beyond XDR-TB was not recommended, Udwadia's research drew the attention of the medical community to the growing epidemic of drug-resistant TB. The coordinator of the WHO's STOP TB department called his findings a wake up call. His research eventually led to improvements in the way TB is managed in India, and elsewhere, and forced the government to make changes to the state-run TB control initiative, or the Revised National Tuberculosis Control Programme. The government increased the budget for the program, and dispatched rapid GeneXpert machines, which can conduct highly sensitive molecular diagnostic testing.

He continues to be an outspoken critic of the government's failures to address the TB problem, and a vocal advocate for newer diagnosis and treatment for TB patients.
