= OrthoCAD Network Research Cell =

Indian research facility

- Established: 2007
- President: Prof. B. Ravi
- Location: Mumbai, Maharashtra
- Operating agency: Indian Institute of Technology Bombay
- Website: http://orthocad.iitb.ac.in/

OrthoCAD Network Research Cell is a federally funded research and development facility in the Indian Institute of Technology Bombay (IIT Bombay), Mumbai, India. The Laboratory's primary function is the design and development of reconstruction systems for orthopaedic and other applications, the current focus is on mega-implants for limb-saving surgery, mainly for children affected by bone cancer. The Cell later led to the establishment of Biomedical Engineering and Technology (incubation) Centre (BETiC).

== Mission ==
The mission of the OrthoCAD group is to develop indigenous research and development capabilities on medical implants, surgical instruments (Armamentarium), testing protocol, and surgery planning and navigation system. This is expected to respond to the growing medical needs of Indian patients, to provide affordable and available devices, and to train graduates as well as research scientists in the area of Biomedical engineering and manufacturing.

== Research partners ==
The OrthoCAD Network Research Cell was established in January 2007 in the Department of Mechanical Engineering at IIT Bombay. It is supported by the Office of the Principal Scientific Advisor to the Government of India, New Delhi. In 2017, a follow-on funding was released by the Office to NFTDC for pilot production and human clinical trials.

The R&D team comprises mechanical engineers, orthopaedic surgeons and materials scientists from

- Indian Institute of Technology Bombay, Mumbai (Prof. Bhallamudi Ravi)
- Non Ferrous Technology Development Centre, Hyderabad (Dr. K. Balasubramanian)
- Tata Memorial Hospital and P.D. Hinduja Hospital, Mumbai (Dr. Manish Agarwal)

== Facilities ==
The Centers at IIT Bombay and NFTDC together have appropriate equipment and instrumentation, including computing facilities.

- Rapid prototyping system for feasibility studies
- Knee simulator and testing machine for loosening and fatigue studies
- Computerized Universal Testing Machine for static testing of implants
- Stereo optical microscope for analyzing wear and fracture of implants
- Photoelasticity test setup for FEM (virtual testing of implants) validation
- Analytical balance (implant wear particle study)
- Surgery navigation system for linking with a 3D planning software
- Medical modelling system for CT to 3D model conversion and surgery planning
- Haptic system for mock surgery
- High-end computing facilities for CAD and FEM analysis
- Precision CNC manufacturing

== Collaboration ==
The OrthoCAD group is collaborating with other similar groups in India and abroad in specific area of mutual interest.
