= Luis Jose De Souza =

Indian oncologist (born 1943)

- Born: 11 December 1943 (age 82); Mumbai, Maharashtra, India
- Occupation: Surgical oncologist
- Spouse: Carmen Mary Julia Saldanha
- Children: Three children
- Parent(s): Luis Jose; Juliet Mary
- Awards: Padma Shri; Qimpro Platinum Standard; Fr. Maschio Platinum Jubilee Humanitarian Award; Vasantrao Naik Pratishtan Award; Suvidha Trust Award; Goa Hindu Association Award; Karmayogi Puraskar; Ramniklal Kinariwal Cancer Research Award; Dr. Manoel Agostinho de Heredia Award; Diwaliben Mohanlal Mehta Award; NATCON-ISO Award

Luis Jose De Souza is an Indian surgical oncologist and the founder of Shanti Avedna Ashram, a charitable trust which runs a network of hospices in Mumbai and Goa. He has also contributed to the establishment of Indian Cancer Cell, an educational program co-sponsored by Tata Memorial Centre, Union for International Cancer Control (UICC) and Indian Cancer Society, for creating cancer awareness in schools. The Government of India awarded him the fourth-highest civilian honour of the Padma Shri in 1992.

== Biography ==
De Souza was born to Luis Jose and Juliet Mary on 11 December 1943 in Mumbai, in the western Indian state of Maharashtra and graduated in medicine (MBBS) from the Grant Medical College and Sir Jamshedjee Jeejeebhoy Group of Hospitals in 1967. His master's degree was also obtained from the same institution in 1970 after which he joined Tata Memorial Hospital, Mumbai and reached the position of the professor and head of the gastroenterology department. Later, he moved to P.D. Hinduja National Hospital and Medical Research Centre as their consultant oncosurgeon. He has also served as a consultant Oncologist to Air India and Indian Airlines.

In 1986, De Souza founded Shanti Avedna Ashram, a charitable trust, and under the aegis of the trust, set up a network of hospices in Mumbai and Goa, reported to be the first such venture for the care of advanced and terminally ill cancer patients in India. Representing Tata Memorial Centre, he associated with Union for International Cancer Control (UICC) and the Indian Cancer Society in 1993 and founded the Indian Cancer Cell, a national program for promoting cancer education in Indian schools. He has served as the associate editor of the Indian Journal of Cancer, editorial consultant of The Practitioner and as a consultant editor of Palliative Medicine. He has written over 70 articles in peer reviewed journals, has delivered keynote addresses in conferences and has organised many medical conferences.

== Awards and honours ==
De Souza is a fellow of the American College of Surgeons, Royal College of Surgeons of England and the Royal College of Surgeons of Edinburgh and a life member of the Indian Medical Association, Association of Surgeons of India, Indian Association for the Study of Liver Diseases, Indian Society of Gastroenterology, Indian Society of Oncology and the Indian Association of Palliative Care. He is the vice president of the Ostomy Association of India since 1990 and is the director of the International Psycho-Oncology Society since 1992. He is also a member of several medical associations such as Indian Cancer Society and International Hepato-Pancreato-Biliary Association.

The Government of India included De Souza in the 1992 Republic Day honours list for the civilian award of the Padma Shri. The same year, he received three more awards, Fr. Maschio Platinum Jubilee Humanitarian Award, Vasantrao Naik Pratishtan Award, and the Rotary Club of Mumbai Public Award and was felicitated by the Mumbai chapter of the Indian Medical Association. He received the Suvidha Trust Award in 1993 and Goa Hindu Association made him their honorary member the next year. Ramniklal Kinariwal Cancer Research Award of the Gujarat Cancer Society and the Dr. Manoel Agostinho de Heredia Award reached him in 1996. He received three awards in 1998, Diwaliben Mohanlal Mehta Award, Old Campionites Association Award and Rotary Club of Bombay South Vocational Excellence Award. Mumbai Medical Aid Association awarded him the Karmayogi Puraskar in 2010. The next year, he was selected as the QIMPRO Platinum Standard 2011. He is also a recipient of the Scroll of Honour from the Breast Cancer Conference of 2000, NATCON-ISO Award and Appreciation Award for Services to Humanity from St. Elizabeth Hospital.

== See also ==
- Goans in science and technology
- Union for International Cancer Control
