= Hinduja Bank (Switzerland) =

Swiss bank

S.P. Hinduja Banque Privée
- Company type: Private
- Industry: Private Banking
- Founded: 1978; 48 years ago
- Founder: S. P. Hinduja
- Headquarters: Geneva, Switzerland
- Key people: Shanu Hinduja (chairwoman); Karam Hinduja (CEO)
- Products: Private Banking, Wealth Management, Corporate Finance
- Number of employees: 200+
- Subsidiaries: Geneva, Zürich, Lugano, London, Dubai
- Website: www.sphinduja.com

Hinduja Bank Ltd. is a Swiss bank.

== History ==
Hinduja was founded as a finance company in 1978 and became a Swiss regulated bank in 1994. It changed its name to S.P. Hinduja Banque Privée. Hinduja Bank has its headquarters in Geneva and has a developed network in Switzerland including offices in Zürich and Lugano. Additionally, it has a presence in London, Dubai, Paris, New York City, Mauritius, and Chennai.

== Services ==
S.P. Hinduja Banque Privée has roots in India, and offering wealth management and investment advisory services to entrepreneurial clients.

The bank's divisions include Wealth Management, Corporate Finance, and Global Investment. Hinduja Bank (Switzerland) Ltd, now S.P. Hinduja Banque Privée, is wholly owned by S.P. Hinduja.

In December 2009, it was announced that S.P. Hinduja Banque Privée acquired a majority stake in Chennai-based Paterson Securities Pvt. Ltd.

In February 2010, it was announced S.P. Hinduja Banque Privée acquired Lugano-based Banca Commerciale Lugano SA.

In June 2020, it was announced that Karam Hinduja was appointed as S.P. Hinduja Banque Privée's CEO.

S.P. Hinduja Banque Privée has a 100% owned subsidiary in Dubai with a Category 1 Banking License. This license enables it to provide a full range of banking services from the Dubai International Financial Centre (DIFC). The name of the subsidiary is Hinduja Bank Middle East Ltd (HBME). This entity is authorised and regulated by the Dubai Financial Services Authority (DFSA).

Hinduja Bank Middle East Ltd (HBME) changed its name to S.P. Hinduja Advisory Limited.
