= Quaker Houghton =

American chemical company

Quaker Chemical Corporation
- Trade name: Quaker Houghton
- Type: Public
- Traded as: NYSE: KWR; S&P 600 component
- Industry: Chemicals
- Founded: 1918; 108 years ago
- Headquarters: Conshohocken, Pennsylvania, U.S.
- Number of locations: 21 countries and 35 locations
- Area served: Worldwide
- Key people: Joseph Berquist (CEO and President)
- Products: Metalworking process chemicals, coatings and Other chemical products
- Revenue: ▼US$1.84 billion (2024)
- Operating income: ▼US$195 million (2024)
- Net income: ▲US$117 million (2024)
- Total assets: ▼US$2.61 billion (2024)
- Total equity: ▼US$1.35 billion (2024)
- Number of employees: 4,400 (2024)
- Website: home.quakerhoughton.com

Quaker Chemical Corporation, doing business as Quaker Houghton, is an American chemical company that was founded in 1918. It is headquartered in Conshohocken, Pennsylvania. With its global presence in 21 countries and 35 locations worldwide, the company has over 50% of net sales outside of the United States. Quaker Houghton manufactures process fluids for use in the steel, aluminum, metalworking, automotive, mining, aerospace, tube & pipe, can making, and other industrial processes. On August 1, 2019, Quaker Chemical combined with Houghton International, a Gulf Oil company, to form Quaker Houghton. The Hinduja Group of India is the largest shareholder through its Gulf Oil subsidiary.

== Products ==
Quaker Houghton produces process fluids and chemical specialties to support a variety of metal stocks and machining processes. These product lines include:

== History ==
On November 11, 1918, Quaker Chemical Corporation was founded as Quaker Oil Products Corporation. Its business consisted of the manufacture and sale of oil products, chiefly for lubrication and for the textile industry.

In 1930, Quaker reorganized and changed its name to Quaker Chemical Products Corporation and incorporated in the Commonwealth of Pennsylvania. During this time, Quaker expanded its scope with products for the metalworking industry. In 1947, Quaker entered into the steel market.

In 1962, Quaker Chemical Products Corporation changed its name to Quaker Chemical Corporation to better suit the scope of its activities, which included process engineering and services, as well as the development, manufacture and sale of industrial specialty chemical products. In the early1960s, Quaker established its first European subsidiary in Uithoorn, Netherlands, Quaker Chemical B.V., to manufacture and market Quaker products to industries in Europe. In 1963, Quaker formed a U.K. subsidiary Quaker Chemical Limited. A year later, Quaker entered into a joint venture in Australia, Quaker Chemical (Australasia) Pty. Limited. In 1968, Quaker entered into a Joint venture in Mexico, TecniQuimia Mexicana S.A. de C.V. In 1970, Quaker entered into a joint venture in Japan, Nippon Quaker Chemical, Ltd.

On May 3, 1972, Quaker completed its initial public offering (IPO). The mid-1970s saw the launch of the QUINTOLUBRIC® polyol ester line of fluids. In June 1978, Quaker made its first major U.S. acquisition of Selby, Battersby & Co., a manufacturer of flooring systems for industrial, commercial and institutional buildings, and marine decking materials.

In 1987, Quaker entered the aerospace coating market with the acquisition of AC Products, Inc. in California.

The 1990s saw Quaker expand into markets in France, China and Brazil and file an application to list its common shares for trading on the New York Stock Exchange (“NYSE”) under the ticker symbol KWR. First NYSE trade occurs on August 23, 1996, for 100 shares. The decade was capped off with Quaker entering into a joint venture in India, Quaker Chemical India Limited.

In 2002, Quaker's new corporate worldwide headquarters opened in Conshohocken, Pennsylvania - USA. In addition, Quaker acquired multiple assets including Quima International, LLC (forming Q2 Technologies, LLC), United Lubricants Corporation, Epmar Corporation and Quaker Chemical South Africa (Pty) Ltd.

Throughout the first decade of the new millennium, Quaker continued with strategic acquisitions and company growth.

In 2006, Quaker expanded its manufacturing and R&D presence in China with a new facility and regional headquarters in Qingpu, Shanghai.

In 2010, Quaker entered the motorsports world by forming a partnership with the Sarah Fisher Hartman Racing team to develop new greases for IndyCar that would reduce mechanical loss of energy and extend the life of the bearings. Quaker acquired D.A. Stuart's aluminum hot rolling business and Summit Lubricants, a specialty grease manufacturer in the US.

In 2011, Quaker acquired G.W. Smith to become a leading die casting lubricant provider in the U.S.

In 2012, Quaker acquired NP Coil Dexter. It also debuted its new integrated marketing campaign “It’s what’s inside that counts”, encompassing an updated brand identity, logo and tagline.

In 2013, Quaker acquired a tin plating business, complementary to its steel portfolio.

In 2014, Quaker launched CoolanTool, a mobile application that facilitates the monitoring processes of metalworking fluids and organization of the data results in a number of ways. Quaker acquired ECLI Products, a high-tech automotive greases manufacturer and Binol AB, a Swedish manufacturer of environmentally acceptable lubricants for the metalworking, forestry and sawmill industries.

In 2015, Quaker acquired Verkol S.A., Spain. And in 2016, Lubricor Inc. in Canada.

In 2017, Quaker and Houghton International executed an agreement to combine the companies. Both are headquartered in the Philadelphia, Pennsylvania area.

== Operating locations ==
Quaker has multiple operating locations in the Asia/Pacific region including Quaker Chemical (China) Co., Ltd. (Asia/Pacific Headquarters), Quaker Chemical (Australasia) Pty. Limited, Quaker Chemical India Private Limited, Nippon Quaker Chemical, Ltd (Japan) and Quaker (Thailand) Ltd.

Quaker also has a significant presence in the Europe, Middle East and Africa region including Quaker Chemical B.V. (EMEA Headquarters, Netherlands), Quaker Chemical Limited (England), Quaker Chemical S.A. (France), Verkol S.A.U and Quaker Chemical S.A. (Spain), Quaker Italia S.r.l, Moscow Representative Office of Quaker Chemical B.V., Binol AB (Sweden) and Quaker Chemical South Africa (Pty.) Limited.

Quaker's locations in North America include AC Products Inc. and Epmar Corporation (California), Quaker Chemical Corporation (Middletown, Ohio, Bingham Farms and Detroit Plants), Summit Lubricants Inc. (New York), TecniQuimia Mexicana S.A de C.V. (Mexico), ECLI (Illinois), Lubricor (Waterloo, Canada), and the Corporate Headquarters in Conshohocken, PA.

Quaker also has operating locations in South America including Quaker Chemical S.A. (Argentina), Kelko Quaker Chemical, S.A. (Venezuela) and Quaker Chemical Indústria e Comércio Ltda, the South American Headquarters, located in Brazil.

== Advertising ==
The logo and tagline for Quaker Houghton has been updated since the company rebranded itself in 2019. The company's current tagline is "Forward Together".
