= Hinduja Group =

Indian multinational conglomerate based in Mumbai pvt ltd

- Type: Corporate group
- Industry: Conglomerate
- Founded: 1914; 112 years ago
- Founder: Parmanand Deepchand Hinduja
- Headquarters: Mumbai, Maharashtra, India
- Area served: Worldwide
- Key people: Ashok Hinduja (chairman, India)
- Products: Financial services; ITES; Oil and Gas; Telecom
- Owner: Hinduja family
- Number of employees: 200,000+
- Subsidiaries: Hinduja Bank; Hinduja Healthcare; Ashok Leyland; Gulf Oil International (Note: Rights to the "Gulf" brand for the U.S. are owned by RaceTrac.); IndusInd Bank; OneOTT Intertainment; Quaker-Houghton
- Website: hindujagroup.com

Hinduja Group is an Indian multinational conglomerate, based in Mumbai. The group is present in eleven sectors including automotive, oil and speciality chemicals, banking and finance, IT and ITeS, cyber security, healthcare, trading, infrastructure project development, media and entertainment, power, and real estate. The net worth of the Hinduja brothers was estimated to be US$32 billion in 2022, making them the wealthiest people in the United Kingdom.

In October 2024, the Hinduja family was ranked 11th on the Forbes list of India’s 100 richest tycoons, with a net worth of $22 billion. In May 2025, as per the Sunday Times rich list, the Hinduja family topped UK's richest list for the fourth consecutive year, with a net worth of £35.3 billion.

== History ==
The company was founded in 1914 by Parmanand Hinduja, who was from a Sindhi family based in India. Initially operating in Shikarpur (in modern-day Pakistan) and Bombay, India, he set up the company's first international operation in Iran in 1919. The headquarters of the group remained in Iran until 1979, when the Islamic Revolution forced it to move to Europe.

Group Chairman Srichand Hinduja and his brother Gopichand, also Co-Chairman, moved to London in 1979 to develop the export business; the third brother Prakash manages the group's operations in Geneva, Switzerland while the youngest brother, Ashok, oversees the Indian interests.

The group employs over 200,000 people and has offices in many major cities around the world including in India. In 2017, Srichand and Gopichand Hinduja were described as the wealthiest men in Britain with an estimated wealth of £16.2 billion in the Sunday Times Rich List 2017.

== Hinduja Group companies ==
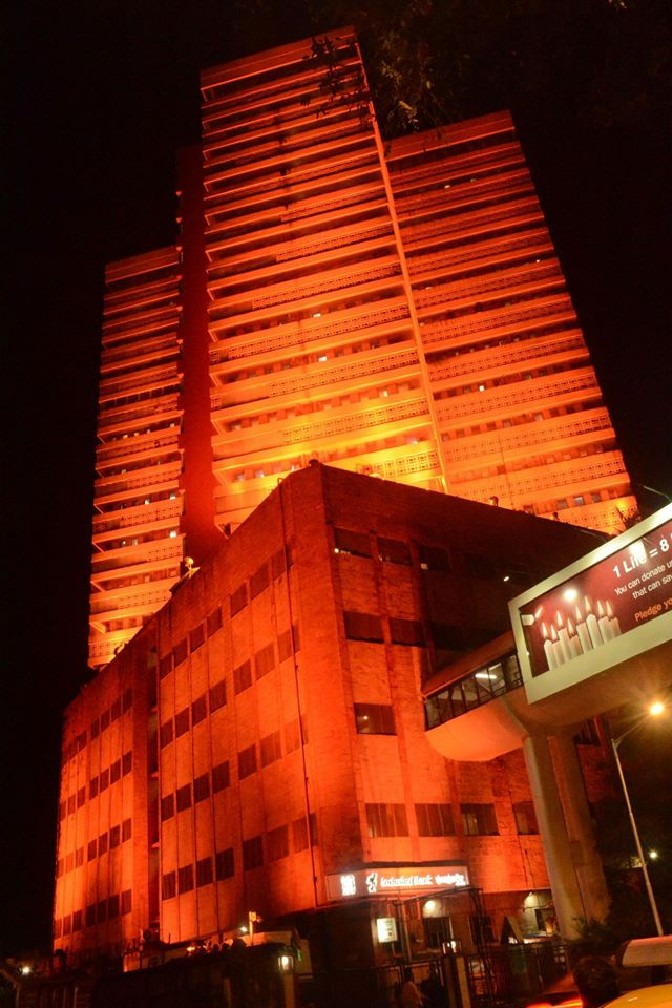
Hinduja National Hospital, Mumbai

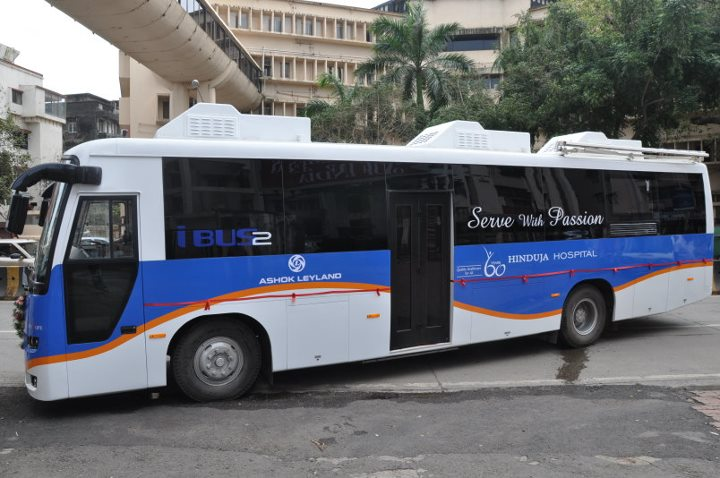
Hinduja National Hospital's mobile clinics built on Ashok Leyland platforms

- Hinduja Housing Finance Ltd.
- Ashok Leyland
  - Switch Mobility
- Ashok Leyland Foundries – a division of Ashok Leyland, also known as Hinduja Foundries
- P.D. Hinduja National Hospital and Medical Research Centre
- Hinduja Healthcare Limited
- Hinduja Bank (Switzerland) Ltd (formerly SP Hinduja Bank)
- IndusInd Bank
- Hinduja Leyland Finance Ltd
- Hinduja Global Solutions Ltd
- GOCL Corporation Ltd
- Gulf Oil International Ltd
- Gulf Oil Lubricants India Limited
- Quaker-Houghton International Ltd
- Gulf Oil Middle East Ltd
- Hinduja National Power Corporation Ltd
- Hinduja Renewables Energy Private Ltd
- Hinduja Realty Ventures Ltd
- Hinduja Group India Limited
- KPB Hinduja College of Commerce
- NXTDIGITAL Ltd (formerly Hinduja Ventures Ltd) – includes Nxtdigital Hits, OneOTT iNtertainment Ltd, INE, and INDigital
- Cyqurex Systems Private Limited
- British Metal Corporation (India) Pvt Ltd
- Hinduja Investments and Project Services Ltd

== Controversies ==
=== Bofors scandal ===
Srichand, Gopichand and Prakash Hinduja were connected with the investigation into the Bofors scandal, in which Swedish firm Bofors was alleged to have paid illegal bribes to government officials and politicians in connection with the US$1.3 billion sale of 400 howitzers to the Indian Government in 1986. The three brothers were charged by the Indian Central Bureau of Investigation in October 2000, but in 2005 the High Court in Delhi threw out all charges against them, citing a lack of evidence and saying that documents central to the prosecution case were "useless and dubious" since their provenance could not be verified. Judge RS Sodhi said: "I must express my disapproval that 14 years of trial and ₹2.5 billion (US$26 million) of public money was spent on the case. It has caused huge economical, emotional, professional and personal loss to the Hindujas."

=== 2001 Hinduja affair ===
In January 2001, it was revealed that UK government Minister Peter Mandelson had telephoned Home Office minister Mike O'Brien on behalf of Srichand Hinduja, who was at the time seeking British citizenship, and whose family firm was to become the main sponsor of the "Faith Zone" in the Millennium Dome. Consequently, on 24 January 2001 Mandelson resigned from the Government for a second time, insisting he had done nothing wrong. An independent enquiry by Sir Anthony Hammond came to the conclusion that neither Mandelson nor anyone else had acted improperly.

In January 2001, immigration minister Barbara Roche revealed in a written Commons reply that Keith Vaz, Member of Parliament for Leicester East and at the time a Foreign Office minister, and other MPs, had also contacted the Home Office about the Hinduja brothers, saying that Vaz had made inquiries about when a decision on their application for citizenship could be expected.

On 25 January, Vaz became the focus of Opposition questions about the Hinduja affair and many parliamentary questions were tabled, demanding that he fully disclose his role. Vaz said via a Foreign Office spokesman that he would be "fully prepared" to answer questions put to him by Sir Anthony Hammond QC who had been asked by the Prime Minister to carry out an inquiry into the affair. Vaz said that he had known the Hinduja brothers for some time; he had been present when the charitable Hinduja Foundation was set up in 1993, and had also delivered a speech in 1998 when the brothers invited Tony and Cherie Blair to a Diwali celebration.

On 26 January 2001, Prime Minister Tony Blair was accused of prejudicing the independent inquiry into the Hinduja passport affair, after he declared that Keith Vaz had not done "anything wrong". On the same day, Vaz told reporters that they would "regret" their behaviour once the facts of the case were revealed. "Some of you are going to look very foolish when this report comes out. Some of the stuff you said about Peter, and about others and me, you'll regret very much when the facts come out," he said. When asked why the passport application of one of the Hinduja brothers had been processed more quickly than normal, being processed and sanctioned in six months when the process can take up to two years, he replied, "It is not unusual."

On 29 January, the government confirmed that the Hinduja Foundation had held a reception for Vaz in September 1999 to celebrate his appointment as the first Asian Minister in recent times. The party was not listed by Vaz in the House of Commons Register of Members' Interests and John Redwood, then head of the Conservative Parliamentary Campaigns Unit, questioned Vaz's judgement in accepting the hospitality.

In March, Vaz was ordered to fully co-operate with a new inquiry launched into his financial affairs by Elizabeth Filkin, who was Parliamentary Commissioner for Standards at the time. Foreign Secretary Robin Cook, Vaz's superior, also urged him to fully answer allegations about his links with the Hinduja brothers. Mr Vaz met Mrs Filkin on 20 March to discuss a complaint that the Hinduja Foundation had given the sum of £1,200 to Mapesbury Communications, a company run by his wife, in return for helping to organise a Hinduja-sponsored reception at the House of Commons. Vaz had previously denied receiving money from the Hindujas, but insisted that he made no personal gain from the transaction in question.

In June 2001, Vaz admitted that he had made representations during the Hinduja brothers' applications for British citizenship while a backbench MP. Tony Blair also admitted that Vaz had "made representations" on behalf of other Asians. On 11 June 2001 Vaz was dismissed from his post as Europe Minister, to be replaced by Peter Hain. The Prime Minister's office said that Vaz had written to Tony Blair stating he wished to stand down for health reasons.

In December 2001, Elizabeth Filkin cleared Vaz of failing to register payments to his wife's law firm by the Hinduja brothers, but said that he had colluded with his wife to conceal the payments. Filkin's report said that the payments had been given to his wife for legal advice on immigration issues and concluded that Vaz had gained no direct personal benefit, and that Commons rules did not require him to disclose payments made to his wife. She did, however, criticise him for his secrecy, saying, "It is clear to me there has been deliberate collusion over many months between Mr Vaz and his wife to conceal this fact and to prevent me from obtaining accurate information about his possible financial relationship with the Hinduja family".

=== Ashok Leyland ===
In February 2005 Ashok Leyland, a company within the Hinduja Group, announced an agreement to supply 100 army vehicles to the Sudanese Defence Ministry. It was alleged by arms campaigner Mark Thomas that this contravened UK arms export legislation, as a number of the company's directors were UK residents or citizens.

=== Human trafficking trial ===
In June 2024, a human trafficking trial began in Switzerland against four members of the Hinduja family, who were accused of exploiting household staff at their lakeside villa in Geneva, by reportedly paying as little as $8 for workdays lasting 15 to 18 hours and confiscating their passports. The allegations were refuted by a lawyer representing the family. It was also claimed that the family spent more on pets than they paid a servant. The Swiss court dismissed the human trafficking charges, but found them guilty of exploiting the staff; it sentenced Prakash Hinduja, wife Kamal, son Ajay and daughter-in-law Namrata to four and a half years of imprisonment.
