= Sunday Times Rich List 2017 =

The Sunday Times Rich List 2017 is the 29th annual survey of the wealthiest people resident in the United Kingdom, published by The Sunday Times on 7 May 2017.

The list was edited by Robert Watts who succeeded long-term compiler Philip Beresford this year.

The list was previewed in the previous week's Sunday Times and widely reported by other media.

== Top 15 fortunes ==
2017		Name	Citizenship	Source of wealth	2016	
Rank	Net worth £ bn	Name	Citizenship	Source of wealth	Rank	Net worth £ bn
01 ▲	£16.20 ▲	Sri and Gopi Hinduja	United Kingdom	Industry and Finance	2	£13.00
02 ▲	£15.98 ▲	Leonard Blavatnik	United States	Investment, music and media	3	£11.59
03 ▼	£14.00 ▲	David and Simon Reuben	United Kingdom	Property and Internet	1	£13.10
04 ▲	£13.22 ▲	Lakshmi Mittal and family	India	Steel	11	£7.12
05 ▲	£11.79 ▲	Alisher Usmanov	Russia	Mining and Investment	10	£7.58
06 ▼	£11.50 ▲	Ernesto and Kirsty Bertarelli	Switzerland & United Kingdom	Pharmaceuticals	5	£9.78
07 ▼	£10.50 ▼	Galen Weston and George G. Weston and family	Canada & United Kingdom	Retailing	4	£11.00
08	£9.66 ▲	Kirsten Rausing and Jörn Rausing	Sweden	Inheritance and investment (Tetra Pak)	8	£8.70
09 ▼	£9.52 ▲	The Duke of Westminster	United Kingdom	Property	6	£9.35
10 ▼	£9.30 ▲	Charlene de Carvalho-Heineken and Michel de Carvalho	Netherlands	Inheritance, banking, brewing (Heineken)	7	£9.15
11 ▼	£9.25 ▲	Hans Rausing and family	Sweden	Packaging (Tetra Pak)	9	£8.60
12 ▲	£8.06 ▲	John Fredriksen and family	Cyprus & Norway	Shipping and oil services	14	£6.30
13	£8.05 ▲	Roman Abramovich	Russia	Oil and industry	13	£6.40
14 ▲	£7.80 ▲	Sir James Dyson and family	United Kingdom	Industry (Dyson)	17	£5.00
15 ▼	£7.20 ▲	Sir David Barclay and Sir Frederick Barclay	United Kingdom	Property, media, internet retailing	12	£7.00

== See also ==
- Forbes list of billionaires
