= India Innovation Growth Programme =

- Accelerating Growth of New India’s Innovations (AGNIi) logo

Agency overview
- Website: www.agnii.gov.in

The India Innovation Growth Programme is a joint initiative by various partners to accelerate innovative Indian technologies into the global markets. The partners are the Department of Science and Technology, Govt. of India; Lockheed Martin Corporation; Indo-US Science & Technology Forum, Federation of Indian Chambers of Commerce and Industry; Stanford Graduate School of Business and the IC² Institute at the University of Texas. Commercialization agreements are inked by the winners of the DST-Lockheed Martin India Innovation Growth Programme every year that aims at getting new technology from the laboratory to the marketplace.
