= Dheeraj Hinduja =

British-Indian businessman (born 1971)

- Born: Dheeraj Gopichand Hinduja; August 1971 (age 55); Iran
- Education: University College London; Imperial College London
- Occupations: Chairman, Ashok Leyland
- Spouse: Shalini Chandiramani
- Children: 2
- Father: Gopichand Hinduja

Dheeraj Gopichand Hinduja (born August 1971) is a British-Indian businessman, the chairman of Ashok Leyland since October 2010.

In the Sunday Times Rich List 2026 ranking of the wealthiest people with UK residence he was placed 1st with his brother Sanjay with an estimated fortune of £38 billion.

== Early life ==
Dheeraj Hinduja was born in Iran in August 1971, the son of Gopichand Hinduja. The Hinduja family is of Sindhi heritage.

He was educated at Emanuel School and received a bachelor's degree from University College London in 1993, and an MBA from Imperial College London in 1994.

== Personal life ==
He married Shalini Chandiramani, a fellow student at Imperial College, and the daughter of a Morocco-based film distributor, some time before 1996. As of 2005, they had two children, Vedika and Vedant.
