= Parmanand Hinduja =

Indian businessman (1901–1971)

Parmanand Deepchand Hinduja
- Born: 1900
- Died: 1971 (aged 70–71)
- Occupation: Businessman
- Known for: Founder, Hinduja Group
- Spouse: Jamuna Parmanand Hinduja
- Children: 5, including Srichand Hinduja, Gopichand Hinduja and Prakash Hinduja

Parmanand Deepchand Hinduja (1900–1971) was an Indian businessman, the founder of the Hinduja Group.

== Career ==
Hinduja was of Sindhi origin. Hinduja was responsible for establishing trading links between India and Persia (now Iran) in 1919.

He founded the P. D. Hinduja National Hospital and Medical Research Centre in Mumbai, and the Hinduja Foundation.

== Personal life ==
He married Jamuna Parmanand Hinduja, and they had five sons:

- Girdhar Hinduja (1930–1963), who later married Lalita Girdhar Hinduja
- Srichand Parmanand Hinduja (1935–2023)
- Gopichand Hinduja (1940–2025)
- Prakash Hinduja (born 1945)
- Ashok Hinduja (born 1950)
