= P. D. Hinduja Hospital and Medical Research Centre =

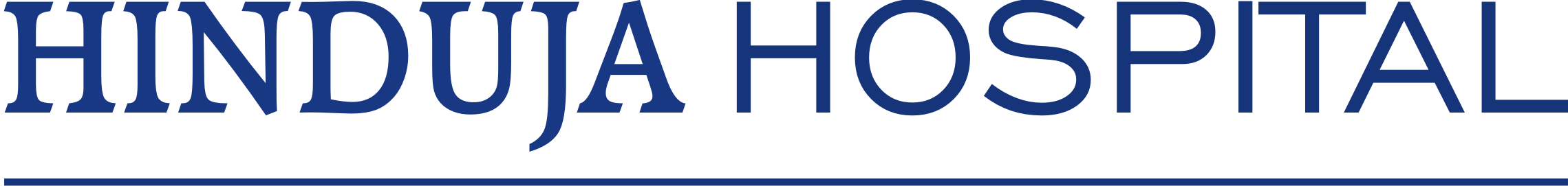

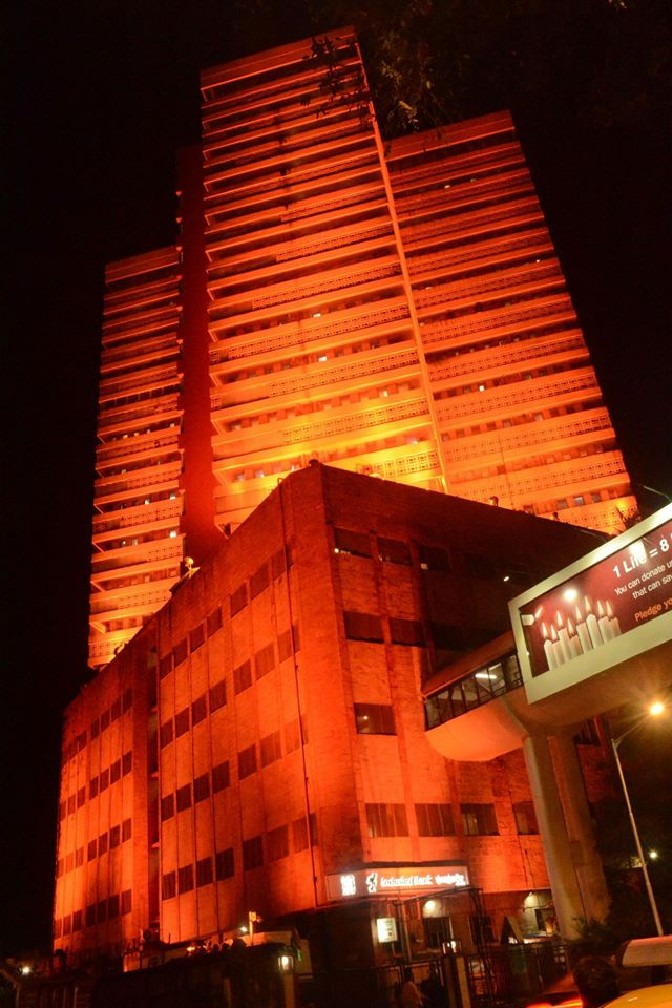

Geography
- Location: Veer Savarkar Marg, Near Shivaji Park, Mahim, Mumbai, Maharashtra, India
- Coordinates: 19.033205°N 72.838605°E

Organisation
- Type: Multispeciality Tertiary Care Hospital
- Network: Hinduja Healthcare Limited

Services
- Emergency department: Yes
- Beds: 520

History
- Founded: 1951

Links
- Website: www.hindujahospital.com
- Lists: Hospitals in India

The P. D. Hinduja Hospital and Medical Research Centre is a multi-speciality, tertiary-care hospital in Mumbai, India. It was founded in 1951 by Parmanand Deepchand Hinduja, in collaboration with the Massachusetts General Hospital, the main teaching hospital of Harvard Medical School, Boston.

The hospital is owned and operated by the London-based Hinduja Group, through Hinduja Healthcare Limited, which also operates Hinduja Healthcare Surgical at Khar, Mumbai. Its chief executive officer is Gautam Khanna.

Hinduja Hospital is ranked the 6th-best hospital in India, 3rd-best among the private hospitals in India, best in Western India, best multi-speciality hospital in metros, and the cleanest hospital in Mumbai.

It has strategic partnerships with King's College London, Guy's and St Thomas' NHS Foundation Trust, Geneva University Hospitals, Stanford University, Henry Ford Health Systems to advance training, education and research.

== Academics ==
- Diplomate of National Board (DNB) in 26 specialities and super-specialities, accredited by the National Board of Examinations.
- BSc, MSc and PhD degrees in Nursing, awarded by the Maharashtra University of Health Sciences.
- MSc and PhD in Applied Biology awarded by the University of Mumbai.
- Allied Health Science courses in 10 disciplines, affiliated to the Health Sector Skill Council.
- Fellowship program for Young Neurosurgeons, Fellowship In Chronic Pain Medicine.
- Post Graduate Diploma in Emergency Medical Services in association with Lifesupporters Institute of Health Sciences. Post-Graduate Diploma in Advanced Clinical Research (PGDACR) and Post-Graduate Diploma In Pharmacovigilance and Clinical Data Management (PGDPVDM) in association with Institute of Clinical Research India.

== Expansion ==
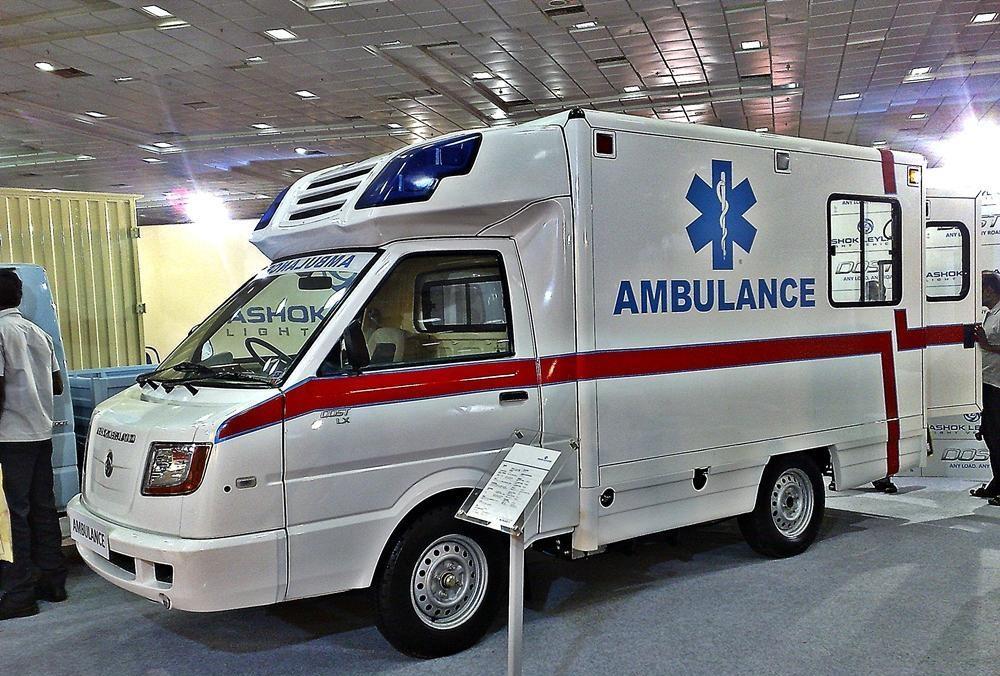
Ambulance based on Ashok Leyland Dost shows synergy between the conglomerate's companies

It has plans to expand its nationwide capacity to 5,000 beds, besides setting up radiology and pathology diagnostic centres, emergency ambulance services and pharmacy retail outlets across India.

It has forayed in to drug manufacturing and healthcare-related speciality chemicals manufacturing. It is also working with the Biomedical Engineering and Technology (incubation) Centre (BETiC) of IIT Bombay to co-develop and commercialise biomedical devices.
