= Samson Fox =

English industrialist and philanthropist

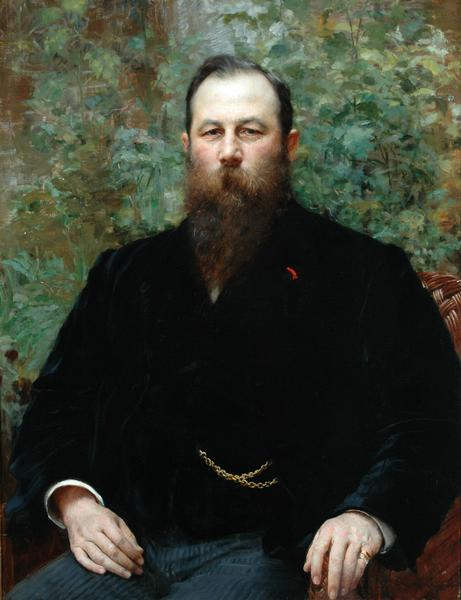
- Born: 11 July 1838; Bradford, West Riding of Yorkshire, UK
- Died: 24 October 1903 (aged 65); Walsall, Staffordshire, UK
- Occupations: Engineer, industrialist and philanthropist
- Known for: Corrugated boiler flue; Pressed steel undercarriage; Water gas; Mayor of Harrogate; Funded building of Royal College of Music and Royal Hall, Harrogate
- Spouses: Mary Anne Slinger; Annie Louise Baxter
- Children: 4
- Awards: RSA gold medal; Legion of Honour

Samson Fox, JP (11 July 1838 – 24 October 1903) was an English engineer, industrialist and philanthropist. He was elected Mayor of Harrogate in Yorkshire and the building of the Royal College of Music in London was funded largely by Fox.

== Life and career ==
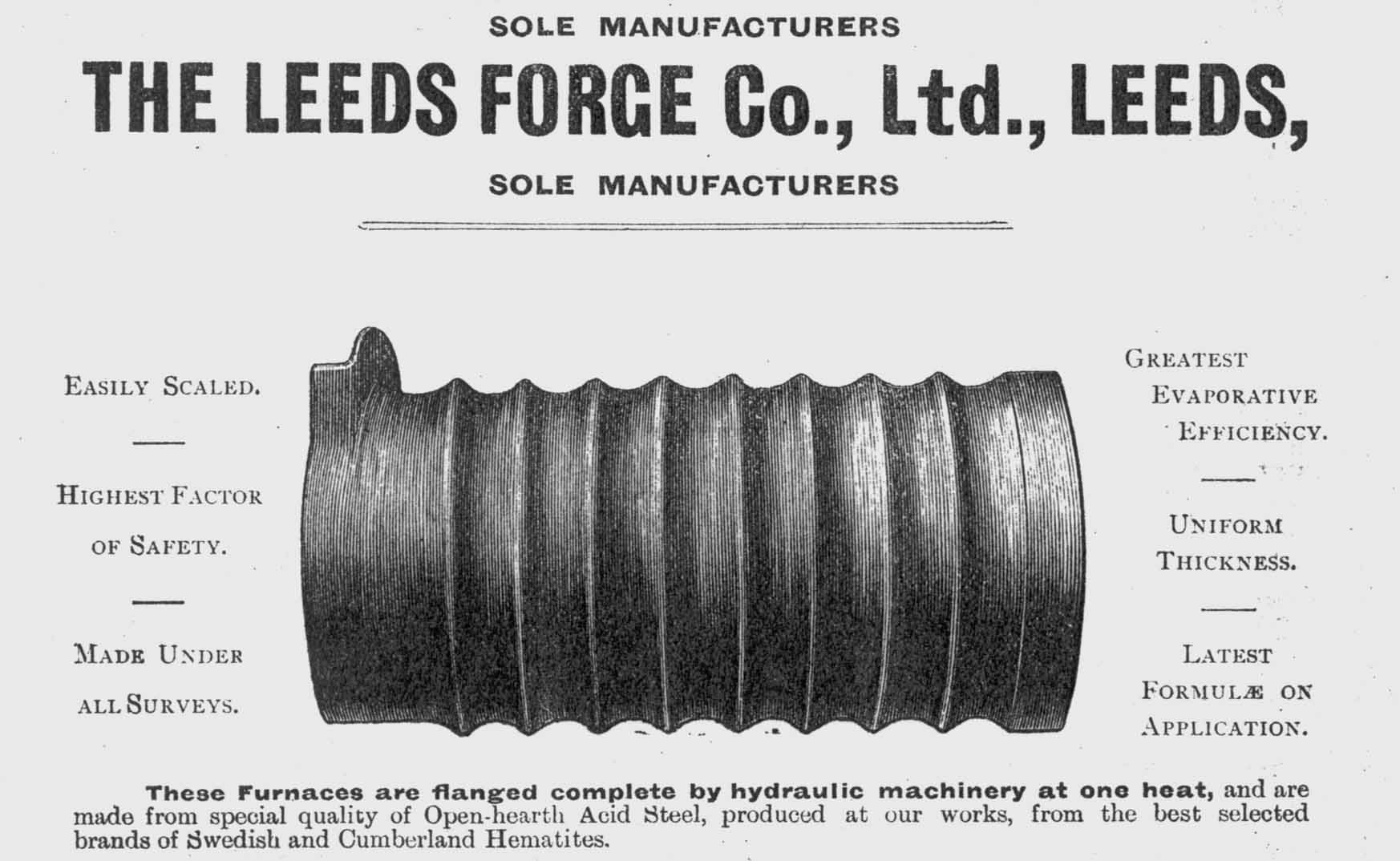
Corrugated boiler flue.

Samson Fox was born at Bowling, Bradford, Yorkshire, the son of Jonas Fox, a mill worker, by his marriage to Sarah Pearson, and the family shortly afterwards moved to live and work in nearby Leeds. At the age of eight Fox started work in a textile mill and at fifteen he became an apprentice in a toolmaking and foundry company. In his late twenties, he was running his own toolmaking business, called the Silver Cross Works.

Ten years later, in 1874, he set up the Leeds Forge Company to produce "Best Yorkshire" iron for locomotive and marine engine parts. In 1877 he developed the corrugated boiler flue for which he became famous. This simple idea involved corrugating the flue pipes inside the boiler, improving both their heat transfer capability and compressive strength, enabling smaller boilers working at higher pressures to be used with improved safety. "Fox Corrugated" was adopted as standard by the Admiralty and major steamship lines and was widely patented.

In 1887, Fox applied his knowledge and experience in forging metal to building forged pressed iron railway undercarriages and trucks. His railway trucks could support 120 tons without failing, were guaranteed for five years, and were soon being sold in Argentina, Belgium, British India, Japan, and Spain, in addition to England. North America however was the world's biggest market, so in 1888 Fox went to the United States, where he made a deal with the famous railway salesman Diamond Jim Brady for Brady to sell American-made Fox trucks in America and to remit one third of the sale price back to Fox as commission. Brady's sales techniques soon succeeded, and in 1888 the Fox Solid Pressed Steel Company was incorporated to manufacture the trucks in Joliet, Illinois.

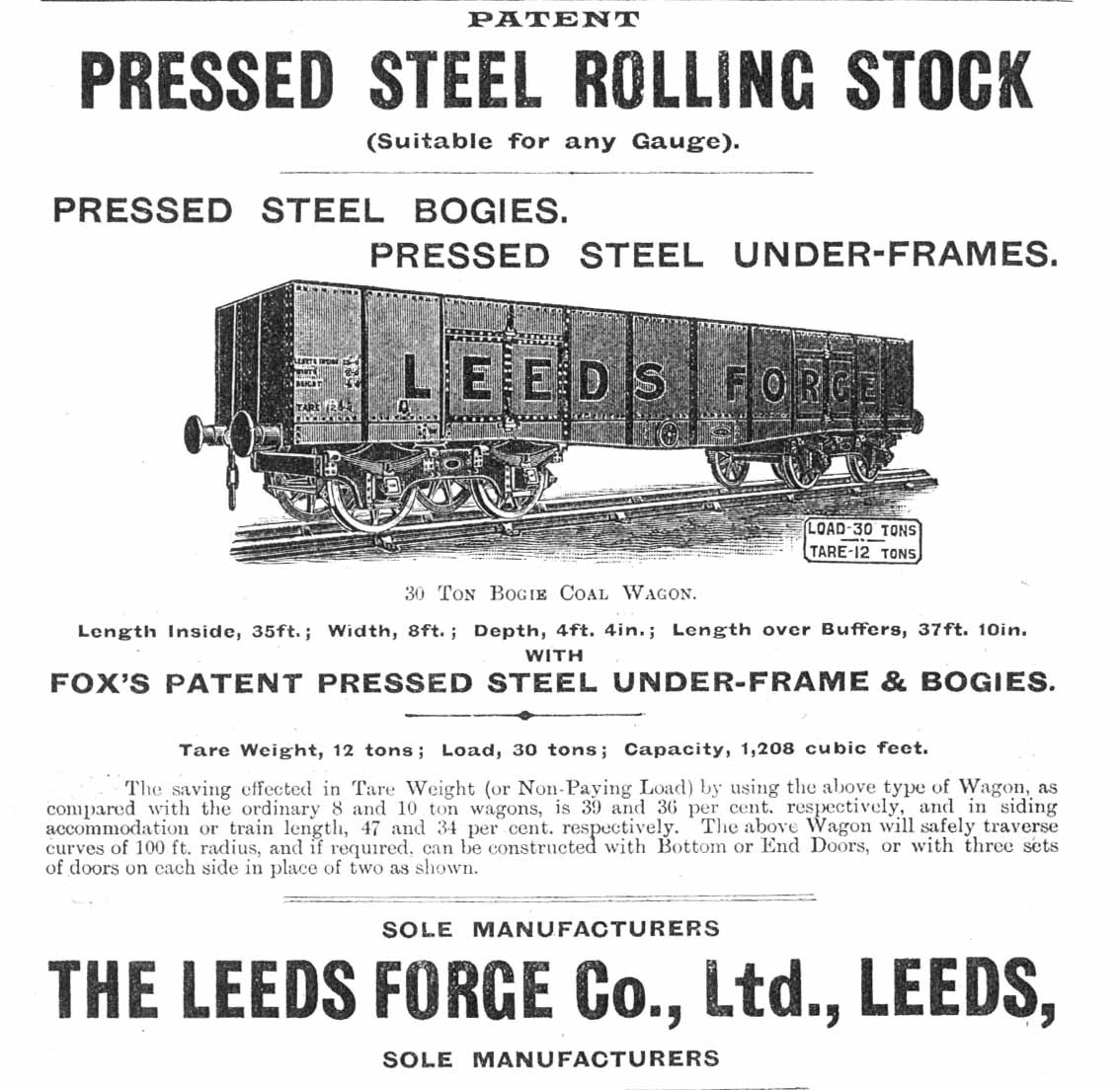
Fox Pressed Steel undercarriage.

Fox won a number of awards for his work, including the Royal Society of Arts gold medal for his corrugated boiler flue and the French Legion of Honour.

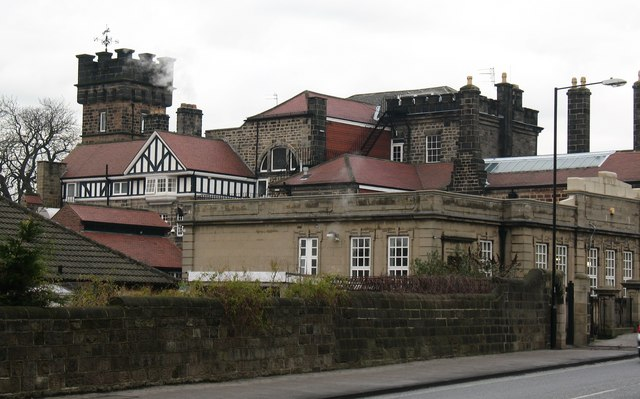
Grove House, Harrogate

Fox bought and extended Grove House in Harrogate, a Yorkshire spa town, and became a benefactor to the local community. He provided Harrogate with its first steam fire engine, built the Grove Road School opposite his home, funded the Royal Hall, and provided affordable social housing. He also built a water gas plant to provide the main street of Harrogate with some of the earliest street lighting. Eventually he became Mayor of Harrogate for three successive years (1890–92), a record never equalled since. He was a JP (Justice of the Peace) for both Leeds and Harrogate.

Around 1890, he invited the Croatian artist Vlaho Bukovac to stay at Grove House and paint a series of family portraits. He collected many of Bukovac's other paintings but the collection was dispersed in an auction in 1911. The most important of all his purchases was the huge 'Suffer the Little Children', shown at the Paris Salon in 1888, which the Fox family later presented to St. Robert's church in Harrogate.

In 1892 and 1894, in two donations, Fox provided most of the funds (£45,000, equivalent to £5,056,982 in 2025) to build the Royal College of Music in Prince Consort Road, Westminster, and a bust of him has a prominent place in the entrance hall.

== Personal life ==
Fox married Mary Anne Slinger in Leeds in 1861. They had four children. At the 1889 wedding of his eldest daughter Clara Louisa to engineer Bernal Bagshawe, Dan Leno was paid the then unheard of sum of £100 to entertain the guests and the grounds of Grove House were thrown open to the people of Harrogate. After the death of his first wife in 1895, he remarried in 1899, to Annie Louise Baxter.

He died in Walsall, Staffordshire, in 1903. King Edward VII sent Harrogate a telegram of condolence. He left an estate valued at £156,722 (equivalent to £16,475,750 in 2025).

In 1891 Samson Fox was granted Arms by the College of Arms, London:

Arms: Argent a representation of a corrugated boiler-flue fesseways proper between two foxes courant Gules each holding in their mouth a trefoil slipped Vert.

Crest: A representation of a corrugated boiler-flue as in the Arms and thereupon a fox Gules resting the dexter paw upon a trefoil slipped Vert.

Motto: Forti Nihil Difficile. (To the brave, nothing is difficult.)

== Family ==
His son, Arthur William Fox, married Hilda Hanbury, sister of actress Lily Hanbury. His grandson Robin Fox was the head of the Fox acting dynasty, making Samson Fox great-grandfather to screen actors Edward Fox OBE, James Fox OBE, and film and theatre producer Robert Fox, great-great-grandfather to English actresses Emilia Fox, Lydia Fox and to actors Freddie Fox, Laurence Fox and Jack Fox.

== Samson Fox in popular culture ==
Fox was the subject of the play, The Man who Captured Sunlight, written by Gavin Collinson and performed by North of Watford and the Harrogate Amateur Dramatic Society at The Royal Hall in Harrogate on 23 September 2022. It was directed by Sian Murray and produced by sisters Ann and Clair Challenor-Chadwick at Cause UK Public Relations. The premier was attended by Freddie Fox and his mother Joanna David. and raised money for the Royal Hall Restoration Trust in memory of historian Malcolm Neesam.

Edward Fox and Freddie Fox were also advisors to the project.
