= Eileen Kerin =

British actress

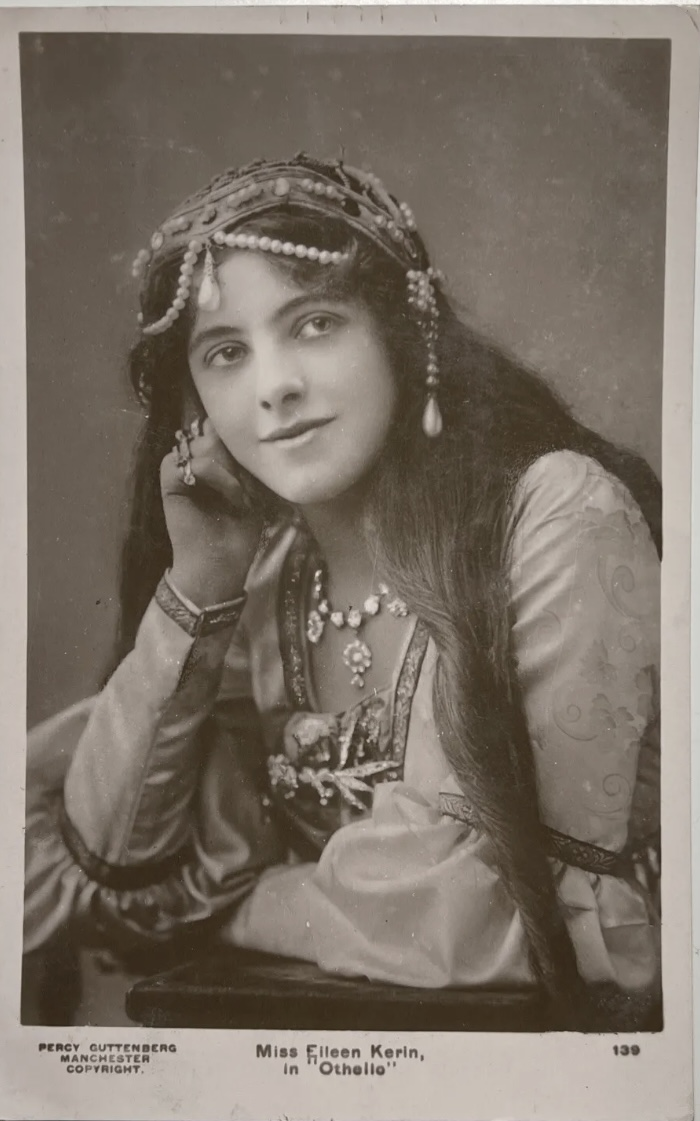
Eileen Kerin as Desdemona in Othello (1907)

Eileen Kerin (22 October 1885 – 13 May 1933) was a British theatre actress and stage beauty of the early 20th-century.

Eileen Kerin was born in Bloomsbury in London in 1885, the third of four children of Charles James Walter Kerin (1847–1886), a cargo surveyor, and his wife Jane née Davis (1852–1920). She was the sister of the actress Nora Kerin and a cousin of the actresses Julia Neilson, Lily Hanbury and Hilda Hanbury and Hilda Jacobson. She played Rosalind opposite A. Hilliard as Orlando in As You Like It (1908) and Desdemona opposite Norman Partriege in the title role in Othello (1907), both at the Queen's Theatre in Manchester. She appeared in a dramatisation of The Prisoner of Zenda by Edward Rose (1910–1911) at the Lyceum Theatre, London.

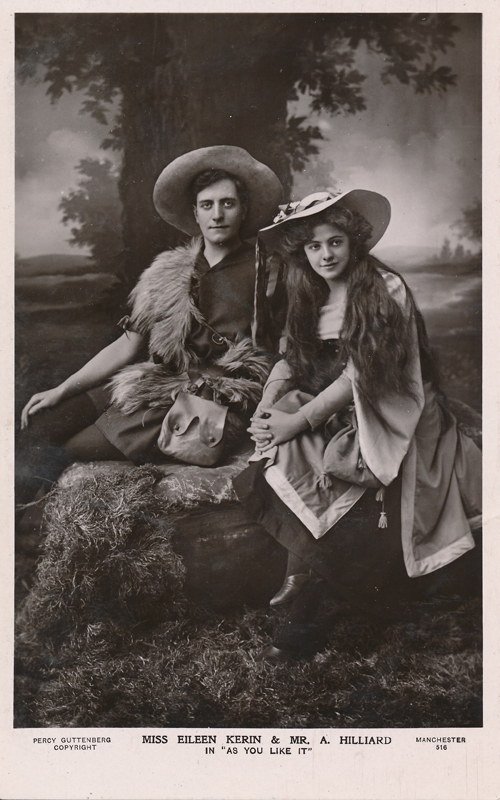
Kerin as Rosalind and A. Hilliard as Orlando in As You Like It (1908)

She married Valentine Walter Ellis in 1911 and died in St John's Wood in London on 13 May 1933. Their son was the actor Desmond Walter-Ellis (1914–1994). She left a fortune of £41,000 to be administered by her brother, Gerald Wykehame Kerin, and by her cousin Ernest Nathaniel Joseph Jacobson CBE, the son of Solomon Jacobson and brother of the actress Hilda Jacobson.
