= Nora Kerin =

British theatre actress and stage beauty

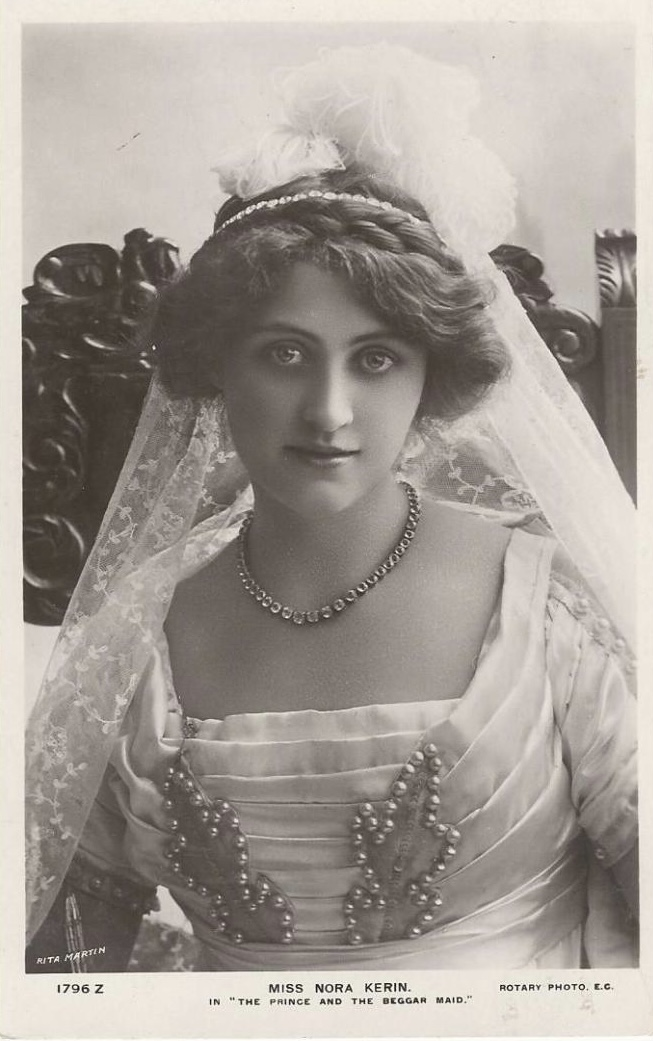
Nora Kerin as Princess Monica in the Lyceum Theatre production of The Prince and the Beggar Maid (1908)

Nora Maude Kerin (22 October 1881 – 21 February 1970) was a British theatre actress and stage beauty of the early 20th-century.

Nora Kerin was born in Bloomsbury in London in 1881, the oldest of four children of Charles James Walter Kerin (1847-1886), a cargo surveyor, and his wife Jane née Davis (1852-1920). She was the sister of the actress Eileen Kerin and a cousin of the actresses Julia Neilson, Lily Hanbury and Hilda Hanbury and Hilda Jacobson. She was educated at Queen's College, London and in Paris.

Kerin made her stage début in 1899. She appeared in Ben-Hur at the Theatre Royal, Drury Lane in London (1901–02). Her first appearance in Shakespeare was at the Queen's Theatre in Manchester as Titania in A Midsummer Night's Dream, as Anne Page in The Merry Wives of Windsor, and as Rosalind in As You Like It. In 1903 she joined a tour of Australia playing a number of roles in the Shakespeare repertory company of George Alexander. In 1904 on her return to England she played Miranda in The Tempest at His Majesty's Theatre (1904–06). She was in The Midnight Marriage (1907) opposite Norman Partriege and Eric Mayne at the Lyceum, and played Juliet opposite Matheson Lang as Romeo in his production of Romeo and Juliet, which opened at the Lyceum Theatre in London on 14 March 1908, which had a run ran of over two months.

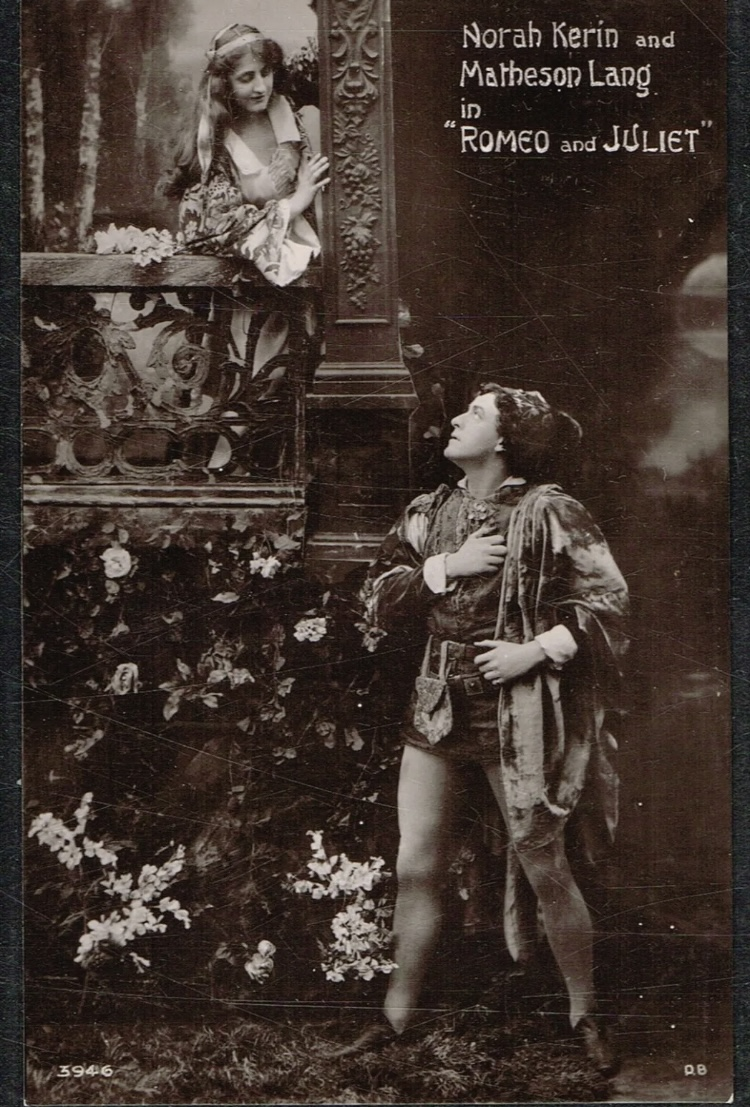
Nora Kerin and Matheson Lang in Romeo and Juliet (1908)

Apparently, her acting did not match her good looks, as the review of her performance as Juliet in Romeo and Juliet at the Lyceum Theatre in London on 14 March 1908 reveals:

MISS KERIN'S JULIET

"Oh, Juliet - Juliet, wherefore art thou Juliet?" This is, of course, an inversion and a parody; but, seriously, the Juliet of Miss Nora Kerin cannot be taken so. She declaims in the conventional old-fashioned style. She somehow destroys - on the stage - her own personality, and instead of looking the pink of charm and youth (as she is when "taking a call") she manages to conceal both. Many of her lines were badly spoken, falsely intonated and punctuated. She had moments - melodramatic outbursts - but she is not the personality - she has not the witching simplicity of the real Juliet.

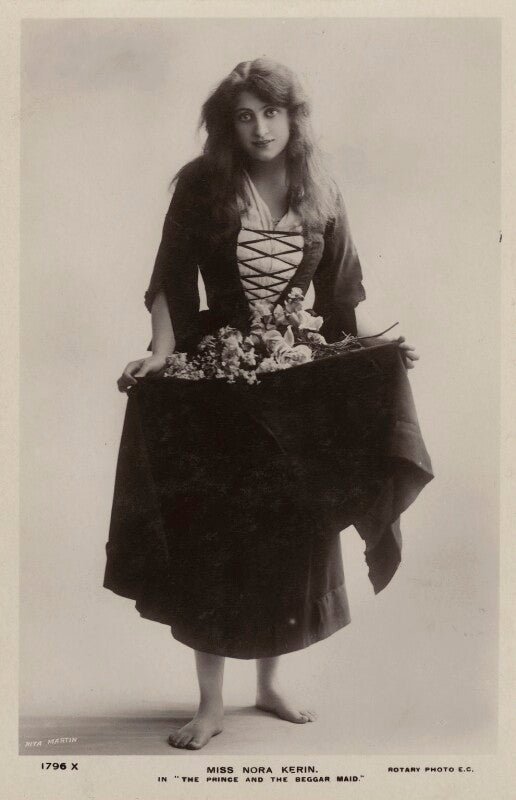
Nora Kerin as the Beggar Maid in the Lyceum Theatre production of The Prince and the Beggar Maid (1908)

Kerin played Princess Monica in The Prince and the Beggar Maid at the Lyceum Theatre in London (1908). She was to play Juliet again in 1909, opposite Basil Gill as Romeo.

On 26 September 1905 at the Central Synagogue in Great Portland Street in London she married Cyril Aaron Michael (1881-1955), the director of a furniture company with whom she had two daughters: Joan Florence Kerin Michael (1906-1978), and Daphne Madge Kerin Michael (1909-1988). They divorced in 1920. In 1939 she was living in Petersfield in Hampshire where her occupation was listed as “unpaid domestic duties”.

Nora Kerin Michael died in London in 1970 aged 86.
