= Robin Fox =

Robin Fox may refer to

- Robin Fox (anthropologist) (1934–2024), Anglo-American anthropologist
- Robin Lane Fox (born 1946), English historian
- Robin Fox (theatrical agent) (1913–1971), English actor and theatrical agent
- Robin Fox (musician) (born 1973), Australian musician

== See also ==
- Robin Fox family, the family of the actor and theatrical agent
