= Hilda Jacobson =

English actress and singer (1879–1954)

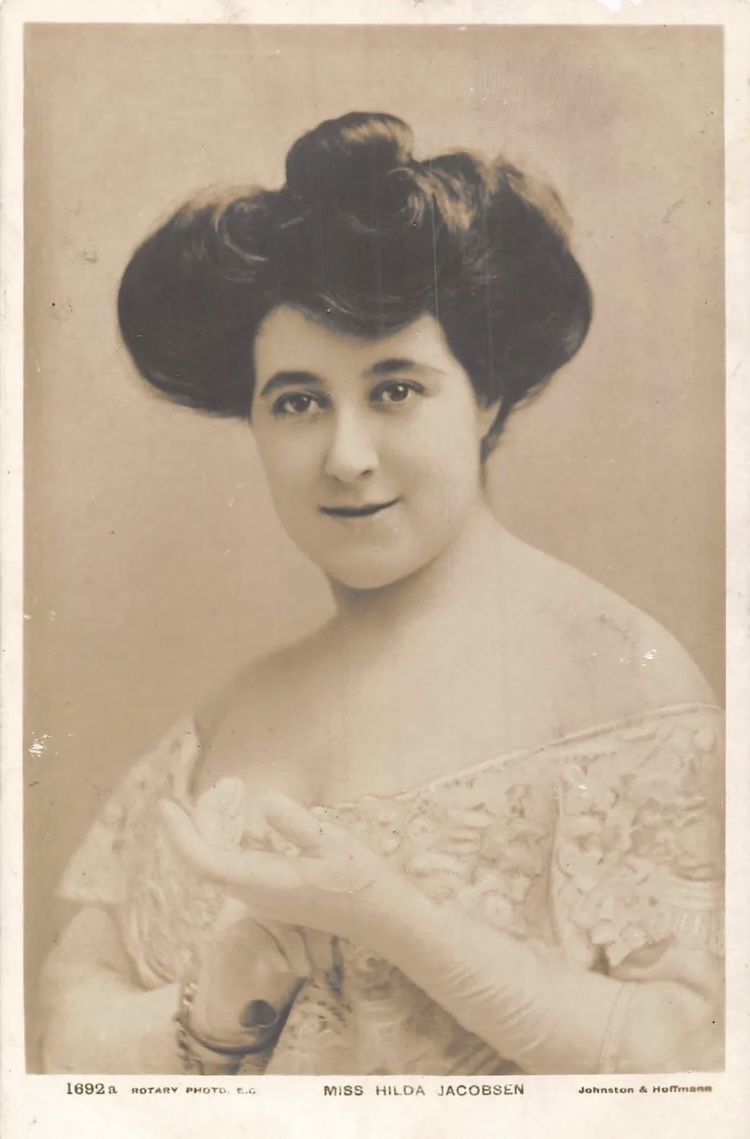
Hilda Rebecca Jacobson

Hilda Rebecca Jacobson (13 October 1879 – 22 December 1954), sometimes billed as Hilda Jacobsen, was an English actress and singer of the Edwardian era who appeared in the works of Gilbert and Sullivan and Edwardian musical comedy. A mezzo-soprano, she created the role of Honoria Crystal in The Catch of the Season at the Vaudeville Theatre in September 1904.

== Early life ==
Jacobson was born in London, the daughter of Solomon Nathan Jacobson (1844–1915), a "Commercial Traveller in Cigars", and Louisa née Davis (1856–1909). She was a cousin of the actresses Eileen Kerin, Nora Kerin, Julia Neilson, Lily Hanbury and Hilda Hanbury.

== Career and later years ==
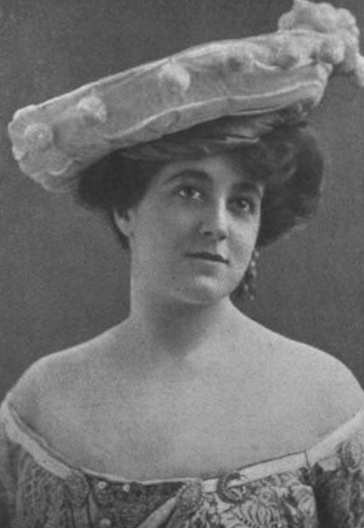
As Zélie Rumbert in The Orchid

Jacobson made her London début as Teresa in L'Amour Mouille by Louis Varney at the Lyric Theatre (April–June 1899). She was one of two actresses to play Inez in the long-running Edwardian musical comedy Florodora, again at the Lyric (November 1899 – July 1900). She played Kate with the D'Oyly Carte Opera Company in a revival of The Pirates of Penzance (July–November 1900) at the Savoy Theatre in London before going on tour with a D'Oyly Carte repertory company as the lead soubrette, appearing as Constance Partlett in The Sorcerer, Hebe in H.M.S. Pinafore, Edith in Pirates, Lady Angela in Patience, the title role in Iolanthe, Melissa in Princess Ida, Pitti-Sing in The Mikado, Phoebe Meryll in The Yeomen of the Guard, Tessa in The Gondoliers, and "Heart's Desire" in The Rose of Persia. Jacobson left the D'Oyly Carte in July 1901.

Jacobson went on to appear at the Gaiety Theatre in London as La Belle Bolero in The Toreador, having previously toured as Doña Teresa in the same musical, and Zélie Rumbert in The Orchid. She was the original Honoria Crystal in The Catch of the Season at the Vaudeville Theatre in September 1904, leaving the production later during its long run to marry the comedian and actor Lawrence Rushworth (1881–1943) at Leeds in Yorkshire in 1906. The 1911 Census for England lists her as an "Actress and Singer" living with her husband and young son Lawrence Rushworth Jnr (1906–1977), her widowed father Solomon Jacobson and a cook and parlourmaid. In 1939 the couple were living in Finchley in London with Jacobson's occupation listed as "unpaid domestic duties".

Jacobson died on 22 December 1954, aged 75. Her funeral was held at Golders Green Crematorium.
