= Royal Hall =

Royal Hall may refer to:

- Royal Albert Hall
- Royal Hall, Harrogate
- Royal Festival Hall, London
- Nottingham Royal Concert Hall, part of the Royal Centre in Nottingham

== See also ==
- Royal Concert Hall (disambiguation)
