= The Soul Keeper =

- Directed by: Roberto Faenza
- Screenplay by: Roberto Faenza, Gianni Arduini, Alessandro Defilippi, Elda Ferri, Hugh Fleetwood, Giampiero Rigosi
- Cinematography: Maurizio Calvesi
- Edited by: Massimo Fiocchi
- Music by: Andrea Guerra
- Production companies: Jean Vigo Italia, Les Films du Centaure, Cowboy Films
- Distributed by: Medusa Distribuzione
- Release date: 2002
- Running time: 90 minutes
- Countries: Italy, France, United Kingdom
- Language: English

The Soul Keeper (Italian: Prendimi l'anima; French: L'âme en jeu) is a 2002 Italian-French-British romance-drama film directed by Roberto Faenza. It is loosely based on real life events of Russian psychoanalyst and physician Sabina Spielrein and notably on her therapeutic and sentimental relationship with fellow psychoanalyst Carl Gustav Jung.

== Plot ==
Marie and Fraser, two young scholars, respectively French and Scottish, get to know each other while they are both in Moscow to research the life of the Russian psychoanalyst Sabina Spielrein. The two researchers reconstruct Sabina's life together, starting with her hospitalisation in Zürich in 1904 for a serious form of hysteria.

There the patient meets the young doctor Carl Gustav Jung, who, using the new methods of psychoanalysis developed by Freud, will be able to cure her. Sabina begins to take an interest in psychoanalysis herself, and begins an intense love affair with Jung. However, discovering that her beloved Carl, married and with two children, although in love with her is trapped to moral doubts, Sabina provokes a scandal. The two finally separate.

== Cast ==
- Emilia Fox: Sabina Spielrein
- Iain Glen: Carl Gustav Jung
- Craig Ferguson: Richard Fraser
- Caroline Ducey: Marie Franquin
- Jane Alexander: Emma Jung
- Joanna David: Sabina's mother
- Viktor Sergachyov: Ivan Ionov
- Giovanni Lombardo Radice: Zorin

== See also ==
- A Dangerous Method
- The Wicked (1991 film)
