= Signora Volpe =

British detective TV series

- Genre: Crime; Mystery
- Created by: Rachel Cuperman; Sally Griffiths
- Written by: Rachel Cuperman; Sally Griffiths
- Starring: Emilia Fox; Giovanni Cirfiera
- Countries of origin: United Kingdom; Italy
- Original language: English
- No. of series: 3
- No. of episodes: 9

Production
- Executive producers: Rachel Cuperman; Sally Griffiths; Emilia Fox; Dudi Appleton; Cristina Giubbetti; Josie Law; Catherine Mackin; Marc Samuelson; Bea Tammer
- Producers: Patricia Rybarczyk; Candida Julian-Jones
- Running time: 90 minutes
- Production company: Route 24

Original release
- Network: Acorn TV
- Release: 2 May 2022 – present

Signora Volpe (Mrs Fox) is a British mystery crime television series, produced by Route 24, of which season 1 was broadcast on Acorn TV in 2022 and repeated on the U&Drama channel in April 2025. The series was created by Rachel Cuperman and Sally Griffiths, and stars Emilia Fox in the title role.

A second series premiered on Monday, 29 July 2024, on both Acorn TV and BBC America, and ran through to 12 August.

A third three-episode series began production in September 2025.

== Synopsis ==
Former British spy Sylvia Fox tries to settle down in a new life in picturesque Panicale, Italy. However, she soon becomes involved in solving local crimes.

== Cast ==
The cast includes:

- Emilia Fox as Sylvia Fox
- Tara Fitzgerald as Isabel Vitale
- Giovanni Cirfiera as Capitano Riva
- Jamie Bamber as Adam
- Matteo Carlomagno as Matteo Vitale

== Production ==
The first series began filming in Italy in May 2021.

== Episodes ==
=== Series 1 (2022) ===
| No. overall | No. in series | Title | Directed by | Written by | Original release date |
|---|---|---|---|---|---|
| 1 | 1 | "An Anxious Aunt" | Dudi Appleton | Rachel Cuperman and Sally Griffiths | 2 May 2022 |
Disillusioned with her job, MI6 spy Sylvia Fox leaves London to head to Italy for her niece's wedding. But all is not as it seems. When the groom fails to show up on the wedding day, Sylvia becomes suspicious and goes to look for him - only to find the body of a woman floating in the lake at the bottom of his garden. Digging deeper, it appears the groom has been living under an assumed identity, and a connection with a local mob boss leads Sylvia right into the path of danger.
| 2 | 2 | "Secrets & Sacrifices" | Mark Brozel | Rachel Cuperman and Sally Griffiths | 9 May 2022 |
Sylvia helps out on an archaeological dig at the Castello di Monterosa, and finds a skeleton buried in a shallow grave.
| 3 | 3 | "Truffles & Treachery" | Mark Brozel | Rachel Cuperman and Sally Griffiths | 16 May 2022 |
When Sasha Pavlenko, the son of a Russian politician, is arrested in Rome for the murder of a fellow student, Sylvia's ex-husband and ex-colleague Adam asks her to investigate.

=== Series 2 (2024) ===
| No. overall | No. in series | Title | Directed by | Written by | Original release date |
|---|---|---|---|---|---|
| 4 | 1 | "A Debt of Honour" | Declan Recks | Rachel Cuperman and Sally Griffiths | 29 July 2024 |
A pillar of the local community is found dead at the charity he runs, and Antonella's friend is arrested for his murder. Trying to clear the woman's name, Sylvia follows a trail of blackmail, family secrets, and illicit love.
| 5 | 2 | "A Deadly Net" | Bindu De Stoppani | Rachel Cuperman and Sally Griffiths | 5 August 2024 |
Sylvia goes undercover at a lakeside villa, solving a murder and confronting a figure from her past.
| 6 | 3 | "Death of a Ghost" | Declan Recks | Rachel Cuperman and Sally Griffiths | 12 August 2024 |
Sylvia is abducted and fights for her own survival while Riva and her family race to find her.

=== Series 3 (2026) ===
| No. overall | No. in series | Title | Directed by | Written by | Original release date |
|---|---|---|---|---|---|
| 7 | 1 | "Bitter Harvest" | David Evans | Rachel Cuperman and Sally Griffiths | 5 October 2026 |
The murder of a vineyard owner entangles Sylvia in a web of local feuds and dark family dynamics.
| 8 | 2 | "Goldilocks Is Dead" | David Evans | Rachel Cuperman and Sally Griffiths | 12 October 2026 |
When a couple find an unknown young man dead in their bed, it's up to Sylvia to solve the mystery.
| 9 | 3 | "No Escape" | David Evans | Rachel Cuperman and Sally Griffiths | 19 October 2026 |
A brutal killing and a desperate appeal for help put Sylvia's life and happiness in grave danger.
