= A Month by the Lake =

1995 film by John Irvin

- Theatrical release poster
- Directed by: John Irvin
- Written by: Trevor Bentham
- Produced by: Robert Fox
- Starring: Vanessa Redgrave; Edward Fox; Uma Thurman
- Cinematography: Pasqualino de Santis
- Edited by: Peter Tanner
- Music by: Nicola Piovani
- Distributed by: Miramax Films
- Release date: September 22, 1995
- Running time: 92 minutes
- Countries: United Kingdom; United States
- Language: English
- Box office: $2,101,087

A Month by the Lake is a 1995 romantic comedy film starring Vanessa Redgrave, Edward Fox and Uma Thurman. The picture is directed by John Irvin and is based on the story by H.E. Bates. The supporting cast features Alida Valli and Alessandro Gassman.

== Plot synopsis ==
In 1937, two years before World War II, a spinster named Miss Bentley has returned to Lake Como to spend a month's summer holiday to heal herself from the grief of her father's recent death. While there, she meets a bachelor named Major Wilshaw and develops some feelings for him. A young American girl named Miss Beaumont arrives and flirts with the major out of sheer boredom, leading him to believe that she's interested in him.

== Cast ==
- Vanessa Redgrave as Miss Bentley
- Edward Fox as Major Wilshaw
- Uma Thurman as Miss Beaumont
- Alida Valli as Signora Fascioli
- Alessandro Gassman as Vittorio Balsari

== Critical reception ==
In a contemporary review Roger Ebert called the film; "a sly romantic comedy about a collision of sex, ego, will and pride, all peeping out from beneath great thick layers of British reticence. Its delights are wrapped in a lavish production in a beautiful time and place."

On the review aggregator website Rotten Tomatoes, 67% of 18 critics' reviews are positive.

== Awards ==
In 1995, Redgrave was nominated for a Golden Globe Award for Best Actress in a Motion Picture Musical or Comedy, losing to Nicole Kidman for To Die For. This marks John Irvin's first Golden Globe nominated film.
