= A Thousand Kisses Deep (film) =

- DVD release artwork
- Directed by: Dana Lustig
- Written by: Alex Kustanovich; Vadim Moldovan
- Starring: Dougray Scott; Jodie Whittaker; Emilia Fox; David Warner; Allan Corduner
- Cinematography: George Richmond
- Edited by: Alan Levy; Humphrey Dixon
- Music by: Ross Cullum; Sandy McLelland; Mike Moran
- Production company: Tomori Films
- Distributed by: Osiris Entertainment (US)
- Release dates: 29 September 2011 (Raindance Film Festival); 15 June 2012 (United Kingdom)
- Country: United Kingdom
- Language: English

A Thousand Kisses Deep is a 2011 film directed by Dana Lustig and based on a screenplay by Alex Kustanovich and Vadim Moldovan. The film, starring Dougray Scott, Jodie Whittaker and Emilia Fox, is a fantastical thriller about a young woman who, via time-travel, pieces together the events that led to her own death.

The film premiered at the 2011 Raindance Film Festival in the United Kingdom and was released in June 2012 in the United Kingdom and Ireland. The film was released in the United States on DVD and digital platforms on 6 August 2013 by Osiris Entertainment.

== Plot ==
Mia Selva witnesses an old woman living upstairs commit suicide by jumping from their mansion flats. At the pavement, where the woman's body lies, Mia discovered pieces of a torn photograph of Ludwig Giroux, her ex-lover. As the photo was never given to anyone besides Mia, she decided to take a look in the old woman's flat after bribing Max, the building's kindly caretaker. Before entering the old woman's flat, Max demanded Mia should not touch anything, while she promised she wouldn't. There, she discovered many of her personal belongings, including her family photo, her pill containers, and a letter, with a television showing the time 2046.

Mia realizes the old woman was herself. Despite Max's warning, she took out the letter. Max was upset and took Mia with the flat lift, which encompassed the ability to travel back and forwards through time. With the lift, Mia was able to revisit the most significant stages of her life, with the hope she could stop the event from happening.

First, she visits her younger self, who was in a passionate but abusive relationship with the much-older married trumpeter Ludwig Giroux, who performs in the pub "Harmony". He was going to leave Mia as he claimed he was going to New York City to restart his music career. Mia tries to help her younger self and her future through sabotaging the relationship by telling the truth to Stella, Ludwig's wife. After leaving the pub, she confronts her younger self. Mia tried to convince young Mia to leave Ludwig by showing the letter to her. Young Mia refusses, claiming she was able to handle her own life. Returning to her flat, Mia was confronted and sexually teased by Ludwig but witnessed by her younger self. Shocked, young Mia runs away but is hit by a car.

Mia is then taken to her 18th birthday, when she started dating Ludwig. Mia rushes to Harmony in hope of stopping her younger self but fails. Mia asks Max to take her to the time when the family photo was taken. It was the day before her 10th birthday, when her parents took her to a park to listen to a clown playing a trumpet. When kid Mia demanded a "real song", Mia discovers the clown was in fact Ludwig. Mia tries to take her younger self away from Ludwig but kid Mia wanted the clown to come to her birthday party, while the older Mia was invited by Doug, her father.

Mia walks with Ludwig to Harmony. After they left the pub, they were attacked by two gangsters whom Ludwig owed money to. They managed to get away and Mia gave Ludwig a bundle of money, convincing him to go to America. Ludwig takes the money and left with gratitude. Next day, Mia went to the birthday party and talked to Doris, her mother, as well as encouraging kid Mia. Out of her surprise, Ludwig showed up in the flat. To worsen the situation, Ludwig is revealed to have an affair with Doris but was caught by Doug. Doug shoots Ludwig in his arm and Mia takes the gun with her. Mia then took kid Mia outside but was confronted by the police. She managed to flee and runs into Max. Mia asked Max to take her to the time when it all began.

Mia arrives in the time when her family moved into the flat. In this time, she meets her parents, while the pregnant Doris suggested they should go to Harmony for dinner. In the pub, Doris quietly informs Ludwig that he is the father of her baby, making Mia realize Ludwig was her biological father. Ludwig denies this and rejects Doris, causing her to go into labor. As Doris is taken away with Doug, Mia, horrified that she had sex with her father all along, vomits outside. She later enters the pub and shoots Ludwig in the abdomen.

Mia goes to the hospital to visit her baby self. She goes back to the flat to see Max, asking about the old woman living upstairs. Max claimed he did not know such a person and passed her the box containing Doris's personal belongings in her final moment. Returning to the present, Mia takes the box to her mother's grave and leaves, determined to live her life in her own terms.

== Cast ==
- Jodie Whittaker as Mia Selva
- Dougray Scott as Ludwig Giroux
- Emilia Fox as Doris Selva
- David Warner as Max
- Allan Corduner as Buddy
- Jonathan Slinger as Doug Selva
- Chris Wilson as Police Officer
- Charlotte Lucas as Stella Giroux

== Production ==
Production was announced in December 2009 on the film, then titled The Veil of Maya. Production would begin in London in January 2010, with Dougray Scott the first cast member on board.

Director Dana Lustig was the one who asked for the film's title to be changed from The Veil of Maya to Harmony and eventually A Thousand Kisses Deep. "It was originally called The Veil of Maya, but my daughter is called Maya..... so we changed the name to Mia. But people said the title didn’t mean anything, so we changed it to Harmony, because of the music element and the idea of having harmony between yourself and your past and your future, but nobody got that either! So the producers came up with the idea of A Thousand Kisses Deep, and adding the Leonard Cohen poem at the beginning and end".

Actor Dougray Scott took up playing trumpet for the film; Guy Barker taught him.

== Release ==
The film premiered at the Raindance Film Festival in the United Kingdom on 29 September 2011. The film was released theatrically in the United Kingdom and Ireland on 15 June 2012, and on DVD in the United Kingdom on 4 February 2013. The film premiered on DVD and digital in the United States on 6 August 2013.
