= Edward Fox (actor) =

British actor (born 1937)

Edward Fox OBE
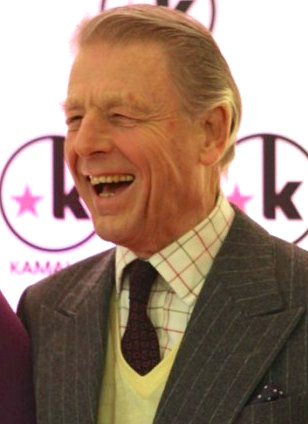
- Fox in 2011
- Born: 13 April 1937 (age 89); Chelsea, London, England
- Education: Harrow School
- Occupation: Actor
- Years active: 1958–present
- Spouses: Tracy Reed (m. 1958; div. 1961) Joanna David (m. 2004)
- Children: 3, including Emilia and Freddie
- Parents: Robin Fox (father); Angela Worthington (mother)
- Relatives: James Fox (brother) Robert Fox (brother)
- Family: Fox
- Military career
- Allegiance: United Kingdom
- Branch: British Army
- Service years: 1958–1960
- Rank: Lieutenant
- Service number: 446128
- Units: Loyal Regiment (North Lancashire)

Edward Charles Morice Fox (born 13 April 1937) is an English actor. He twice won the BAFTA Film Award for Best Actor in a Supporting Role, for his performances in The Go-Between (1971) and A Bridge Too Far (1977), and won the BAFTA TV Award for Best Actor for playing Edward VIII in the television drama serial Edward & Mrs. Simpson (1978).

Fox is also known for his starring role in the film The Day of the Jackal (1973), playing the part of a professional assassin, known only as the "Jackal", who is hired to assassinate French president Charles de Gaulle. Fox has had prominent parts in major British films like Oh! What a Lovely War (1969), Battle of Britain (1969), The Bounty (1984), and Gandhi (1982). He has also worked extensively on the West End stage.

A member of the Fox family, he is the brother of actor James Fox and producer Robert Fox, and the father of actors Emilia and Freddie Fox.

== Early life and education ==
Fox was born the first of three sons on 13 April 1937 in Chelsea, London, to Robin Fox, a theatrical agent, and Angela Muriel Darita Worthington, an actress and writer. He is the father of actors Emilia Fox and Freddie Fox, the elder brother of actor James Fox and film producer Robert Fox, and an uncle of actor Laurence Fox. His paternal great-grandfather was industrialist and inventor Samson Fox, and his paternal grandmother was Hilda Hanbury, sister of stage performer Lily Hanbury. His maternal grandfather was dramatist Frederick Lonsdale, and his maternal grandmother was the daughter of footballer and stockbroker Charles Morice.

Fox was educated at Harrow School and completed National Service in the Loyals, after he had failed to obtain a commission in the Coldstream Guards. He left a two-year course at the Royal Academy of Dramatic Art, saying that it was not useful to him and did not compare to "an apprenticeship in repertory theatre".

== Career ==
Fox's first film appearance was as an extra in The Loneliness of the Long Distance Runner (1962). He also had a non-speaking part as a waiter in This Sporting Life (1963). Throughout the 1960s he worked mostly on stage, including a turn as Hamlet. In the late 1960s and early 1970s he established himself with roles in major British films, including Oh! What a Lovely War (1969), Battle of Britain (1969) and The Go-Between (1971). In The Go-Between he played the part of Lord Hugh Trimingham, for which he won a BAFTA award for Best Supporting Actor. His acting ability also brought him to the attention of director Fred Zinnemann, who was looking for an actor who was not well known and could be believable as the assassin in the film The Day of the Jackal (1973). Fox won the role, beating other contenders such as Roger Moore and Michael Caine.

From then on Fox was much sought after, appearing in such films as A Bridge Too Far (1977) as Lieutenant General Horrocks, a role he has cited as a personal favourite, and for which he won the Best Supporting Actor award at the British Academy Film Awards. He also starred in Force 10 from Navarone (1978), with Robert Shaw and Harrison Ford.

In 1990 Fox appeared as a contestant on Cluedo, facing off against fellow actor Joanna David.

Fox portrayed King Edward VIII in the television drama Edward & Mrs Simpson (1978). In the film Gandhi (1982), Fox portrayed Brigadier-General Reginald Dyer, who was responsible for the Amritsar massacre in India. He then appeared as M in the unofficial Bond film Never Say Never Again (1983), a remake of Thunderball (1965). He also appeared in The Bounty (1984) and Wild Geese II (1985), both opposite Laurence Olivier, and in The Importance of Being Earnest (2002), Nicholas Nickleby (2002), and Stage Beauty (2004).

=== Later stage work ===
Fox consolidated his reputation with regular appearances on stage in London's West End. He was seen in Four Quartets, a set of four poems by T. S. Eliot, accompanied by the keyboard music of Johann Sebastian Bach, performed by Christine Croshaw. In 2010 Fox performed a one-man show, An Evening with Anthony Trollope, directed by Richard Digby Day. In 2013 he replaced Robert Hardy in the role of Winston Churchill in the premiere of The Audience, after Hardy withdrew for health reasons. In 2018 he appeared with his son Freddie Fox in an adaptation of Oscar Wilde's An Ideal Husband.

== Honours ==
Fox was appointed an Officer of the Order of the British Empire for his services to drama in the 2003 New Year Honours.

== Personal life ==
From 1958 until their 1961 divorce, Fox was married to actress Tracy Reed, with whom he has a daughter. In 1971 he began a relationship with actress Joanna David, and they married in July 2004. They have two children together, actors Emilia and Frederick.

Fox has two grandchildren through his daughters.

Fox resides in London and in Wareham, Dorset.

=== Views and advocacy ===
Fox spoke at the conference for the Referendum Party ahead of the 1997 general election and was a friend of its leader, James Goldsmith. He has also been a patron of the UK Independence Party.

In 2002 Fox joined the Countryside March to support hunting rights in the UK. He supported the restoration of the Royal Hall, Harrogate, funded by his great-grandfather Samson Fox.

In 2010 Fox gave his support to a local campaign to prevent a supermarket being built close to his home in Dorset, because of the impact that it would have on independent businesses in the area. He chronicled the events in an article for The Daily Telegraph.

Fox endorsed the successful Leave vote campaign ahead of the referendum to leave the European Union.

== Filmography ==
- 1962 The Loneliness of the Long Distance Runner as Minor Role (uncredited)
- 1963 This Sporting Life as Restaurant Barman (uncredited)
- 1963 The Mind Benders as Stewart (uncredited)
- 1965 Life at the Top as Office Supervisor (uncredited)
- 1966 The Frozen Dead as Norbugh's Brother (Prisoner #3)
- 1967 The Jokers as Lieutenant Sprague
- 1967 The Naked Runner as Ritchie Jackson
- 1967 The Long Duel as Hardwicke
- 1967 I'll Never Forget What's'isname as Waiter
- 1967 Man in a Suitcase (TV, Episode "Castle in the Clouds") as Ezard
- 1968 Journey to Midnight as Sir Robert Sawyer (segment "Poor Butterfly")
- 1968 The Portrait of a Lady (TV series) as Lord Warburton
- 1969 The Avengers (TV, Episode "My Wildest Dream") as Chilcott
- 1969 Oh! What a Lovely War as Aide to Field-Marshal Haig
- 1969 Battle of Britain as Pilot Officer Archie
- 1970 Skullduggery as Bruce Spofford
- 1970 The Breaking of Bumbo as Horwood
- 1971 The Go-Between as Hugh Trimingham
- 1972 Thirty-Minute Theatre (TV, Episode "Bermondsey") as Pip Lester
- 1973 The Day of the Jackal as The Jackal
- 1973 A Doll's House as Nils Krogstad
- 1974 Doctor Watson and the Darkwater Hall Mystery as Dr. Watson
- 1975 Galileo as Cardinal Inquisitor
- 1977 The Squeeze as Foreman
- 1977 The Duellists as Colonel
- 1977 A Bridge Too Far as Lieutenant General Brian Horrocks
- 1977 Soldaat van Oranje as Colonel Rafelli
- 1978 The Big Sleep as Joe Brody
- 1978 Force 10 from Navarone as Sergeant John Miller
- 1978 Edward & Mrs. Simpson (TV miniseries) as King Edward VIII
- 1979 The Cat and the Canary as Hendricks
- 1980 The Mirror Crack'd as Inspector Craddock
- 1981 Nighthawks as ATAC Man #2
- 1982 Gandhi as Brigadier General Reginald Dyer
- 1983 Never Say Never Again as M
- 1983 The Dresser as Oxenby
- 1984 The Bounty as Captain Greetham
- 1985 The Shooting Party as Lord Gilbert Hartlip
- 1985 Wild Geese II as Alex Faulkner
- 1986 Shaka Zulu (TV) as Lieutenant Francis Farewell
- 1986 Anastasia: The Mystery of Anna (TV) as Dr. Hauser
- 1987 A Hazard of Hearts (TV film) as Lord Harry Wrothman
- 1987 Quartermaine's Terms (TV) as St. John Quartermaine
- 1989 Return from the River Kwai as Major Benford
- 1991 Robin Hood as Prince John
- 1991 The Strauss Dynasty as Prince of Metternich
- 1993 The Maitlands (TV) as Major Harry Luddington
- 1994 A Feast at Midnight as Father
- 1994 Sherwood's Travels as Donen
- 1995 A Month by the Lake as Major Wilshaw
- 1995 Wild Discovery as Narrator
- 1996 Gulliver's Travels (TV miniseries) as General Limtoc
- 1996 September (TV film) as Archie Balmerino
- 1997 Prince Valiant as King Arthur
- 1997 A Dance to the Music of Time as Uncle Giles
- 1998 Lost in Space as Businessman
- 2001 All the Queen's Men as Aitken
- 2002 The Importance of Being Earnest as Lane
- 2002 Foyle's War (TV) as Assistant Commissioner Summers
- 2002 Daniel Deronda (TV) as Sir Hugo Mallinger
- 2002 Nicholas Nickleby as Sir Mulberry Hawk
- 2003 The Republic of Love as Richard
- 2004 Stage Beauty as Sir Edward Hyde
- 2004 Poirot: The Hollow (TV) as Gudgeon
- 2005 Lassie as Colonel Hulton
- 2007 Oliver Twist (TV) as Mr. Brownlow
- 2010 Marple: The Secret of Chimneys (TV) as Lord Caterham
- 2011 Midsomer Murders: "Dark Secrets" (TV) as William Bingham
- 2013 Lewis: "Intelligent Design" (TV) as Dr. Yardley
- 2013 National Theatre Live: The Audience as Winston Churchill
- 2014 Katherine of Alexandria as Emperor Constantius
- 2015 The Dresser (TV) as Thornton
- 2017 Taboo (TV) as Horace Delaney (Deceased)
- 2018 An Ideal Husband as Earl of Caversham
- 2018 Johnny English Strikes Again as Agent Nine
- 2024 The Gentlemen as the dying father (episode 1)

== Selected theatre performances ==
- Harry, Lord Monchensey in The Family Reunion by T. S. Eliot. Directed by Michael Elliott at the Royal Exchange, Manchester. 1979)
- Captain in The Dance of Death by August Strindberg. Directed by Kenneth MacMillan at the Royal Exchange, Manchester. (1983)
- Crichton in The Admirable Crichton by J.M.Barrie at the Theatre Royal, Haymarket, London. (1989)

== Other projects and contributions ==
- When Love Speaks (2002, EMI Classics) – William Shakespeare's "Sonnet 140" ("Be wise as thou art cruel; do not press"), a compilation album that features interpretations of Shakespeare's sonnets and excerpts from his plays by famous actors and musicians.

=== Books ===
- Fox, Edward (1980). "Contributor". David Jacob's Book of Celebrities' Jokes & Anecdotes. By Jacobs, David. Robson Books. p. 50. ISBN 0860511251.

== Awards and nominations ==
| Awards | Year | Category | Work | Result | Ref. |
|---|---|---|---|---|---|
| British Academy Film Awards | 1972 | Best Actor in a Supporting Role | The Go-Between | Won | |
| British Academy Film Awards | 1978 | Best Actor in a Supporting Role | A Bridge Too Far | Won | |
| British Academy Television Awards | 1979 | Best Actor | Edward & Mrs. Simpson | Won | |
| Laurence Olivier Awards | 1981 | Actor of the Year in a New Play | Quartermaine's Terms | Nominated | |
| British Academy Film Awards | 1983 | Best Actor in a Supporting Role | Gandhi | Nominated | |
