= Beggar My Neighbour (TV series) =

British TV sitcom (1966–1968)

- Starring: Peter Jones; June Whitfield; Desmond Walter-Ellis; Reg Varney; Pat Coombs; Rosemary Faith
- Country of origin: United Kingdom
- No. of series: 3
- No. of episodes: 23 (15 missing) + 1 short

Production
- Running time: 30 minutes

Original release
- Network: BBC1
- Release: 24 May 1966 – 26 March 1968

Beggar My Neighbour is a British sitcom starring Reg Varney, Peter Jones, June Whitfield, Pat Coombs and (later) Desmond Walter-Ellis. Made in black-and-white, it was broadcast from 1966 to 1968 and was written by Ken Hoare and Mike Sharland and produced by David Croft.

== Cast ==
- Peter Jones – Gerald Garvey (pilot and series 1)
- Desmond Walter-Ellis – Gerald Garvey (from series 2)
- June Whitfield – Rose Garvey
- Reg Varney – Harry Butt
- Pat Coombs – Lana Butt
- Rosemary Faith – Deidre Garvey (from series 2)

== Plot ==
Rose Garvey and her husband Gerald live next door to her sister Lana Butt and her husband Harry in the fictional Larkworthy Road, Muswell Hill, North London. Gerald is an under-paid junior executive, while Harry is a well-paid fitter. The slightly snobbish Gerald makes sure he and Rose keep up a pretence of doing well even though they are not. Meanwhile, the Butts' relative wealth encourages Lana to put on airs and graces, though Harry remains down to earth.

== Episodes ==
Only eight episodes of the original run of 23 have survived: episode one and two from the first series and all six episodes from series two. Series three is entirely lost.

=== Pilot (1966) ===
- "Beggar My Neighbour" (24 May 1966) (part of Comedy Playhouse)

=== Series one (1967) ===
1. "Have Car, Won't Travel" (13 March 1967)
2. "Lay Down Your Arms" (20 March 1967)
3. "An Education in Itself" (3 April 1967)
4. "Gone But Not Forgotten" (10 April 1967)
5. "At Home On Saturday" (17 April 1967)
6. "Marriage Muswell" (24 April 1967)
7. "Keep Taking The Tablets" (1 May 1967)

=== Series two (1967) ===
1. "Let Them Eat Cake" (2 July 1967)
2. "A Host of Friends" (9 July 1967)
3. "No Bed of Rose's" (16 July 1967)
4. "Laying Down the Law" (23 July 1967)
5. "My Fair Harry Butt" (30 July 1967)
6. "For Better, for Worse" (6 August 1967)

=== Special (1967) ===
- Short Special as part of Christmas Night with the Stars

=== Series three (1968) ===
1. "Old Before My Time" (30 January 1968)
2. "Ask Me No Questions" (6 February 1968)
3. "Is There Anybody There?" (13 February 1968)
4. "Whiter Shade of Yellow" (20 February 1968)
5. "Let Sleeping Dogs Lie" (27 February 1968)
6. "Grey Flannel Love Suit" (5 March 1968)
7. "What About the Workers?" (12 March 1968)
8. "Whose Baby Are You?" (19 March 1968)
9. "Drink To Me Only" (26 March 1968)

=== Surviving episodes ===
Series Number	Episode Number	Title	Broadcast	Notes
Series 1	Episode 1	"Have Car, Won't Travel"	13 March 1967	Aired by BBC Four on 11 November 2025
Series 1	Episode 2	"Lay Down Your Arms"	20 March 1967	
Series 2	Episode 1	"Let Them Eat Cake"	2 July 1967	
Series 2	Episode 2	"A Host of Friends"	9 July 1967	
Series 2	Episode 3	"No Bed of Rose's"	16 July 1967	
Series 2	Episode 4	"Laying Down the Law"	23 July 1967	
Series 2	Episode 5	"My Fair Harry Butt"	30 July 1967	
Series 2	Episode 6	"For Better, for Worse"	6 August 1967	
