= Desmond Walter-Ellis =

English actor (1914–1994)

Desmond Walter-Ellis (16 September 1914 – 16 September 1994) was an English actor. He was active in a range of genres, from classic drama to cabaret, revue and musicals. He played a major part in the development of BBC Television when it restarted after the Second World War.

== Life and career ==
Walter-Ellis was born in London on 16 September 1914, the son of Valentine Walter-Ellis and his wife Eileen Ellis, née Kerin.

He trained for the stage at the Old Vic and Sadler's Wells and made his first professional appearance in December 1932. He then acted at the Old Vic, Regent's Park Open Air Theatre, and Sadler's Wells, mostly in the classics. After repertory work, he served in the armed forces during the Second World War.

In the immediate post-war years, Walter-Ellis worked mainly in the fledgling television service. In 1950 a magazine dubbed him "the first actor television star", with "seventy different performances to his credit … romped to favour in television versions of the Aldwych farces". His roles—on live television in the early days—included Mr Posket in The Magistrate, the Mad Hatter in Alice in Wonderland, Gerald in Rookery Nook, Aubrey in Tons of Money and Captain Absolute in The Rivals.

In the 1950s Walter-Ellis was seen in cabaret, revue, pantomime as well as straight dramas. In the Australian tour of Camelot in 1963–1965 he played King Pellinore. In London in 1966 he was Teddy Brewster in Arsenic and Old Lace with Sybil Thorndike and Athene Seyler.

On television in the 1960s he was known for starring in the sitcom series Beggar My Neighbour, taking over from Peter Jones as the harassed junior executive. His cinema films include A Run for Your Money (1949), Carry On Admiral (1957), The Great St. Trinian's Train Robbery (1966), Can Heironymus Merkin Ever Forget Mercy Humppe and Find True Happiness? (1969) and The Rise and Rise of Michael Rimmer (1970). For BBC Radio he repeated his Teddy Brewster in 1973, with Thorndike and Seyler.

Walter-Ellis died in London on his eightieth birthday, 16 September 1994.

== Sources ==
- Herbert, Ian, ed. (1977). Who's Who in the Theatre (sixteenth ed.). London and Detroit: Pitman Publishing and Gale Research. ISBN 978-0-273-00163-8.
