= Robin Fox (theatrical agent) =

English actor, theatrical agent (1913–1971)

Robin Fox MC
- Born: 15 July 1913; England, UK
- Died: 20 January 1971 (aged 57); Ockenden Cottage, Cuckfield, Sussex, England, UK
- Occupation: Theatrical agent
- Spouse: Angela Worthington (m. 1935)
- Children: Edward; James; Robert
- Family: Fox

Robin Fox (15 July 1913 – 20 January 1971) was an English actor, theatrical agent, impresario, and chairman of the English Stage Company, who is best remembered as the founder of a family of actors. His sons are Edward, James, and Robert Fox. His grandchildren include Emilia, Laurence, Jack, and Freddie Fox.

== Early life ==
Fox was born at 12 Stratton Street, Mayfair, Westminster, the son of Arthur William Fox and former actress Hilda Louise Fox (née Alcock), a member of Herbert Beerbohm Tree's theatrical company. He was the grandson of Samson Fox (1838–1903), a British engineer and philanthropist, who was the principal founder of the Royal College of Music and inventor of the corrugated boiler flue. His mother and his aunt Lily Hanbury were first cousins of Julia Neilson, who was the mother of Phyllis and Dennis Neilson-Terry. Julia Neilson was married to Fred Terry, brother of Dame Ellen Terry. Altogether seven of his cousins were actors.

He was educated at Harrow School, where he was a member of the school's swimming team.

In November 1933, aged twenty, Fox was banned from driving for a year for driving without due care and attention. After colliding with another vehicle, he had offered the explanation that he was in a hurry to catch an aeroplane.

== Career ==
In the 1930s, Fox became a solicitor in the City of London. In 1939 he joined the Honourable Artillery Company as a gunner. During the Second World War, he trained at an Officer Cadet Training Unit and in August 1940 was commissioned as a second lieutenant into the Royal Artillery. In February 1945, he was awarded the Military Cross, for gallant and distinguished service with the Royal Artillery while on active service in the Italian campaign. During the war, Fox rose to the rank of acting major.

Fox became a theatrical agent, and then in January 1957 formed the Robin Fox Partnership Ltd, with its offices at 24, Old Burlington Street, as a production company, with the actor Robert Morley as his partner. He was later also the senior partner of the Robin Fox Organization, with its offices in Regent Street.

In January 1959, Fox was elected as a member of the English Stage Company, to serve on its Artistic Committee with Lord Harewood, Ronald Duncan, Oscar Lewenstein, and Peggy Ashcroft.

As well as representing many performers, including Julie Christie, Paul Scofield, Marianne Faithfull, and Maggie Smith, he also acted on behalf of film-makers, of whom one was Joseph Losey.

In 1966, Robin Fox appeared in a cameo role in the film Modesty Blaise, as a man who rings a doorbell.

In 1970, Fox and Oscar Lewenstein jointly succeeded Neville Blond as chairman of the English Stage Company, but Fox died from cancer only six months later.

== Personal life ==
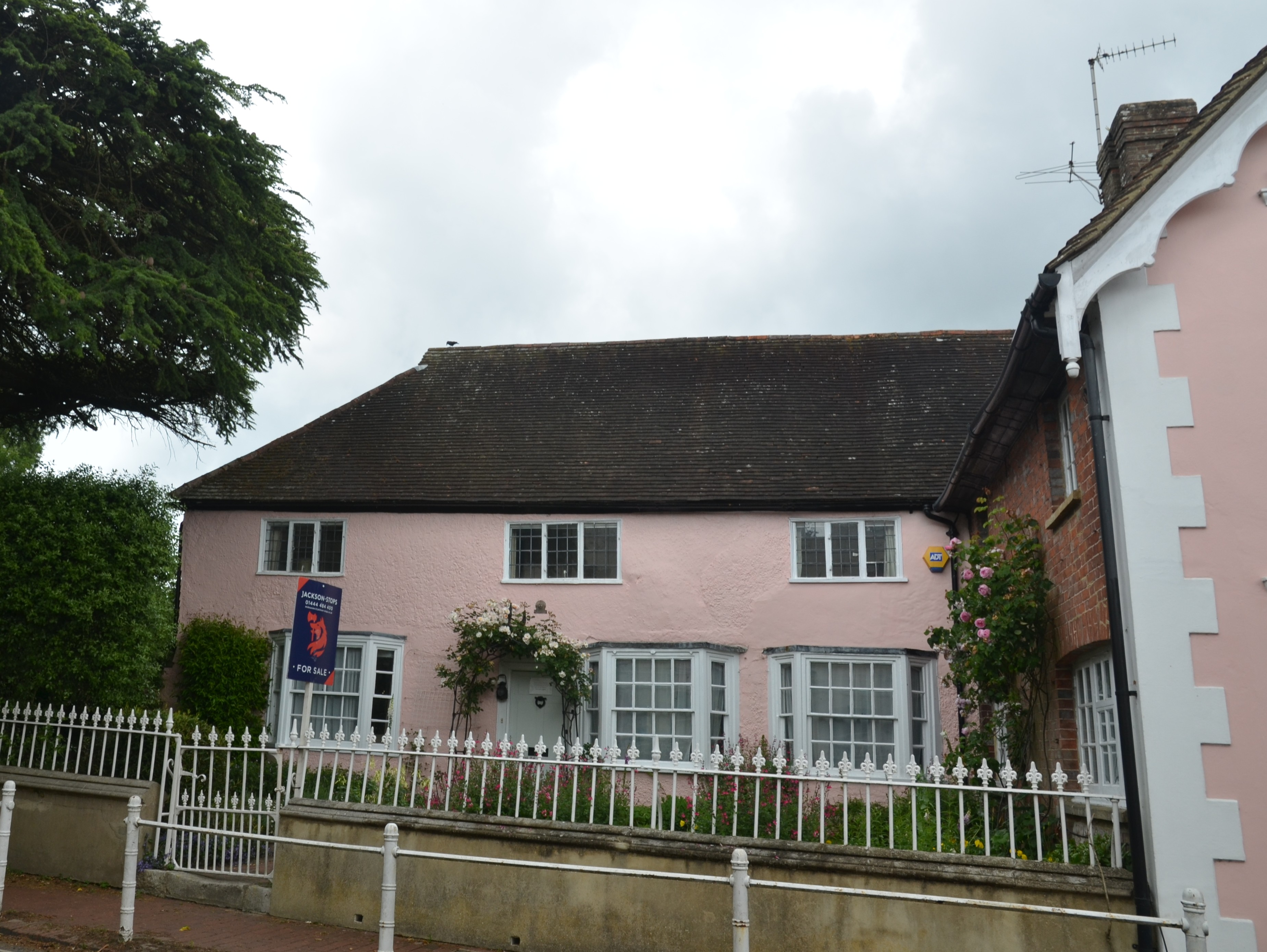
Ockenden Cottage, Cuckfield, West Sussex, Fox's last home.

In May 1935, an engagement was announced in The Tatler between Fox and Angela Worthington, an actress and the illegitimate daughter of the English playwright Frederick Lonsdale and Muriel Rose Worthington, with photographs. In October 1935, in Westminster, they were married. At the age of thirteen, she and her mother had been the subjects of Noël Coward's song "Don't Put Your Daughter on the Stage, Mrs Worthington!" She later wrote two books about her life and marriage, Slightly Foxed (1986) and Completely Foxed (1989), and revealed that when she was newly married and first pregnant Fox told her "You do know that I have no intention of being faithful to you. I shall sleep with whoever I like". They had three sons, Edward, James, and Robert Fox.

Fox has been called "a notorious philanderer", and his conquests are reported to have included Princess Marina of Greece and Denmark, who was the widow of Prince George, Duke of Kent. He had a long affair with Rosalind Chatto, wife of the actor Tom Chatto, who was his secretary before she became an agent on her own account, and is claimed to be the father of her son, Daniel Chatto.

In 1962, Fox quarrelled bitterly with Tony Richardson, when he attempted to forbid his friend Richardson from giving his son James "Willie" Fox a part in the film The Loneliness of the Long Distance Runner. Fox claimed Willie had no talent for acting and should not give up his job in a bank.

At the time of his death, Fox was living at Ockenden Cottage, Cuckfield, Sussex. He left an estate valued at £102,625 (equivalent to £1,297,062 in 2025).

== Filmography ==
Year	Title	Role	Notes
1966	Modesty Blaise	Man Who Pushes the Doorbell	Uncredited
