= Joanna David =

British actress (born 1947)

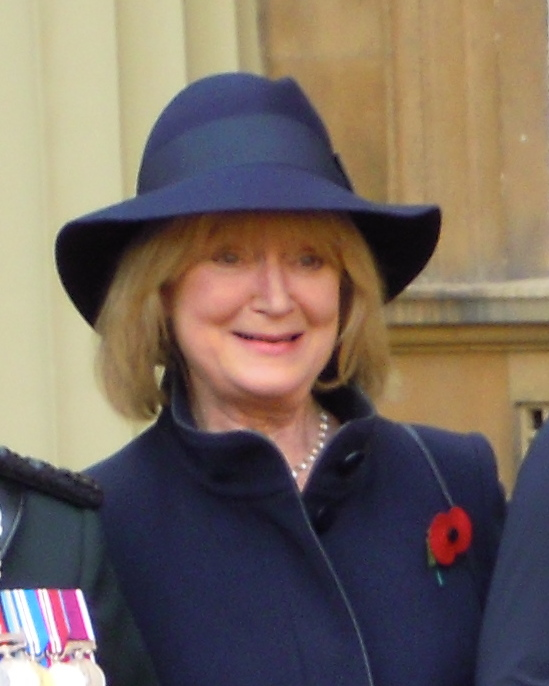
- David in 2014
- Born: Joanna Elizabeth Hacking
- Other name: Joanna Ward
- Occupation: Actress
- Years active: 1968–present
- Spouse: Edward Fox (m. 2004)
- Children: Emilia Fox; Freddie Fox
- Family: Fox (by marriage)

Joanna David (born Joanna Elizabeth Hacking) is an English actress, best known for her television work.

== Early life and education ==
Joanna David (born January 17, 1947) was educated at Altrincham Grammar School for Girls, Elmhurst Ballet School then in Camberley, the Royal Academy of Dance, and the Webber Douglas Academy of Dramatic Art.

== Career ==
Her first major television role was as Elinor Dashwood in the BBC's 1971 dramatisation of Sense and Sensibility followed a year later by War and Peace, in which she played Sonya. David also appeared in the TV series The Last of the Mohicans (BBC), and in two episodes of Colditz, ("Missing, Presumed Dead" and "Odd Man In", 1972) as Cathy Carter, the wife of Flt. Lt. Simon Carter (played by David McCallum).

In 1975, she played Theo Dane in the BBC's television adaptation of Ballet Shoes by Noel Streatfeild. 32 years later in 2007, her daughter, Emilia Fox, starred in a new adaptation of the same book.

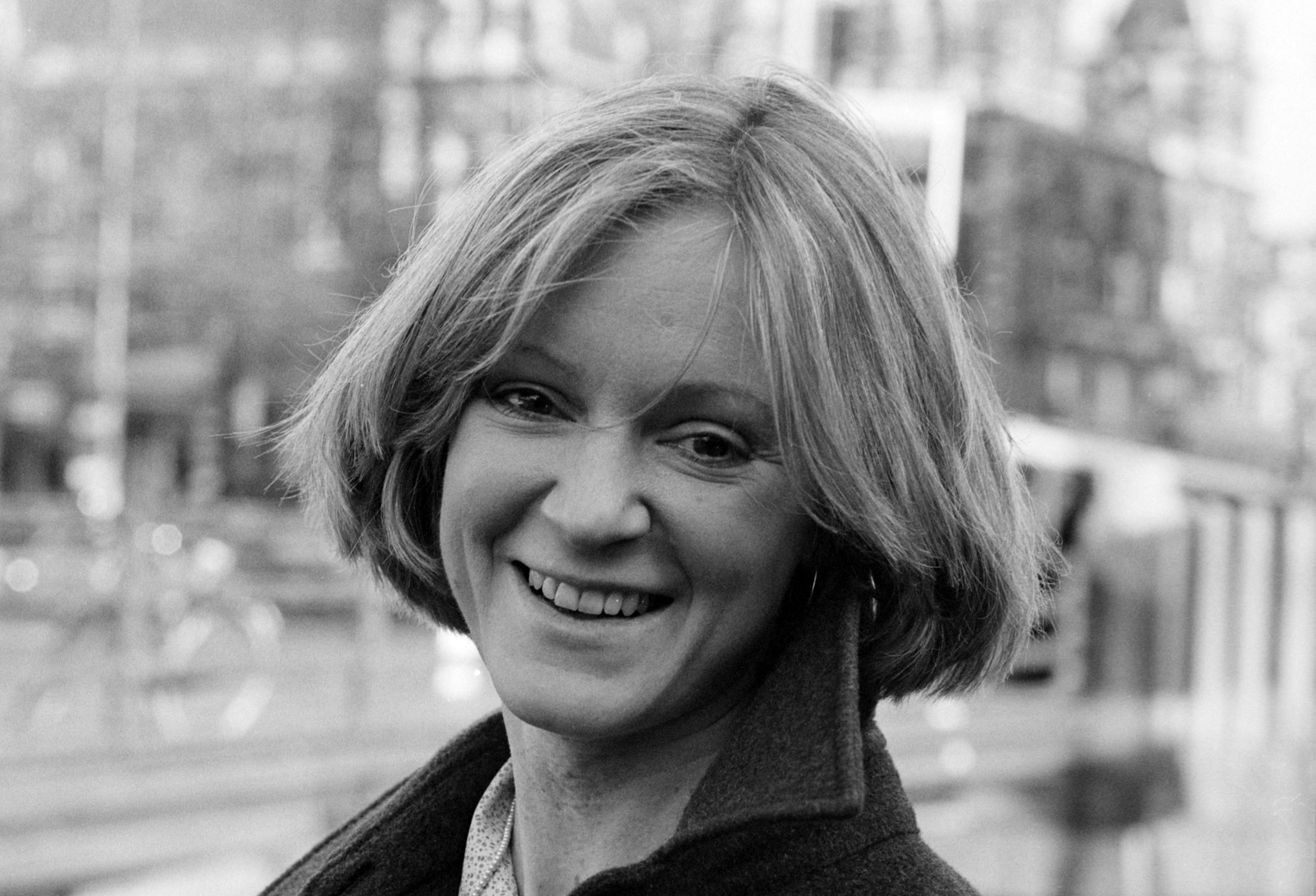
Joanna David, 1979

In 1976, David starred as Marian Pearce, a mysterious and traumatised young inmate who is unable to speak, in an episode of the women's prison drama Within These Walls; she would go on to reprise this memorable role in a later episode, screened in 1978.

In 1978, David appeared in the mini series Lillie as Jeanne Marie, the daughter of Lillie Langtry. The following year, she played the heroine of Daphne du Maurier's Rebecca, opposite Jeremy Brett in the BBC miniseries of the same name. In 1980, she played Mary Pearcey in the Granada Television series Lady Killers.

In 1985, she appeared as Dolly in Anna Karenina. In 1987, she acted in the Agatha Christie's Miss Marple episode, "4:50 from Paddington", as Emma Crackenthorpe.

In 1990, she appeared as a contestant on Cluedo, facing off against her future husband and fellow actor Edward Fox.

In 2005, she appeared in two episodes of Bleak House, playing Mrs. Bayham Badger, alongside Gillian Anderson, Charles Dance, Alun Armstrong and Warren Clarke. Mr. Bayham Badger was played by Richard Griffiths.

David's many other television appearances have included The Memoirs of Sherlock Holmes, as Susan Cushing in the 1994 episode The Cardboard Box, Miss Marple, Foyle's War, Rumpole of the Bailey, Inspector Morse, Midsomer Murders, The Darling Buds of May and, in 2004, Rosemary & Thyme in an episode entitled "Orpheus in the Undergrowth". More recent appearances include the BBC comedy series Never Better, Mutual Friends, and Death in Paradise (2014, series 3, episode 8).

She gradually moved on to more mature parts and appeared as Mrs. Gardiner in the acclaimed 1995 BBC TV series of Pride and Prejudice, in which her daughter Emilia Fox had her first major television role as Georgiana Darcy. In 1998, she appeared in the Midsomer Murders episode "Written in Blood" as Amy Lyddiard. In 2009, she appeared in Alan Ayckbourn's Woman in Mind.

Her film appearances have included roles in The Smashing Bird I Used to Know (1969), the horror short Sleepwalker (1984), Comrades (1986), Secret Friends (1991), Rogue Trader (1999), Cotton Mary (1999), The Soul Keeper (2002, as the mother of her real-life daughter Emilia) and These Foolish Things (2006). She played Mother Julian in the Midsomer Murders episode, "Sacred Trust" (2011). In 2013, she appeared in Downton Abbey as Duchess of Yeovil in two episodes and also in the Agatha Christie’s Miss Marple episode, "Greenshaw’s Folly", as Grace Ritchie. She appeared in the "Murderous Marriage" episode of Agatha Raisin as Lady Derrington in 2016.

She is a vice-president of the Theatrical Guild.

In 2022, she starred in an animated short film adaptation of Leonora Carrington's short story The Debutante, voicing the eponymous character and her mother.

== Selected theatre performances ==
- Sonia in Uncle Vanya by Anton Chekhov, directed by Michael Elliott at the Royal Exchange, Manchester, (1977).
- Mary in The Family Reunion by T. S. Eliot, directed by Michael Elliott at the Royal Exchange, Manchester, (1979).
- Pat Green in Breaking the Code by Hugh Whitemore at the Theatre Royal, Haymarket, London (1986).
- Margaret in The Ghost Train Tattoo by Simon Robson (world premiere) directed by Braham Murray and Sarah Frankcom at the Royal Exchange, Manchester, (2000).
- Miss Prism in The Importance of Being Earnest by Oscar Wilde, directed by Braham Murray at the Royal Exchange, Manchester, (2004).

== Personal life ==
In 1971, she began a relationship with Edward Fox, with whom she has two children: Emilia and Frederick. They married in 2004.

== Charity work ==
David is a trustee of the National Brain Appeal, the charity dedicated to the National Hospital for Neurology and Neurosurgery in London. David underwent brain surgery in 1993 to correct a congenital Arnold–Chiari malformation.

In January 2013, David became a patron of Pancreatic Cancer Action, a charity focussed on raising the awareness of pancreatic cancer. David's friend Angharad Rees died from the illness in 2012. She is also a patron of the refugee charity Firefly International.
