= Robin Fox family =

British show business family

Fox family
- Current region: England
- Origin: United Kingdom
- Founder: Robin Fox; Angela Worthington
- Members: James Fox; Edward Fox; Robert Fox; Emilia Fox; Freddie Fox; Jack Fox; Laurence Fox; Samson Fox

The Fox family is a family with several members in acting and related professions over a number of generations. Robin Fox (1913–1971), an actor and theatrical agent, and his wife Angela, née Worthington (1912–2000), a comedienne, had three sons: the actors Edward and James, and Robert, who became a theatrical agent. Their grandchildren include the actors Emilia, Freddie, Jack, Laurence, and Lydia Fox.

== Family origin ==
Robin Fox was born in the parish of St George Hanover Square, Westminster, the son of Hilda Louise (Alcock), an actress, and Arthur William Fox. Robin Fox was the grandson of industrialist, engineer, and philanthropist Samson Fox.

Fox was related to the Hanbury and Neilson acting dynasty through his mother, whose sister was the stage actress Lily Hanbury. Their first cousin Julia Neilson was married to the actor Fred Terry, brother of the late nineteenth-century star Ellen Terry. Altogether, five of Hilda and Lily Hanbury's first cousins were actors in Victorian and Edwardian theatre.

Angela Worthington's father was English playwright Frederick Lonsdale and her sister was Felicity Shaw, who wrote mystery novels under the pseudonym Anne Morice. Noël Coward's 1935 song "Mrs. Worthington", with its refrain "Don't put your daughter on the stage, Mrs. Worthington", was allegedly written about her and her mother, the socialite Muriel Rose "Lucy Glitters" Worthington. Angela later became a comedienne.

== Arms ==
Coat of arms of Fox of Grove House
Notes The crescent denotes that Wordsworth is a second son. Crest Upon a wreath of the colours, a representation of a corrugated boiler-flue as in the arms, and thereupon a fox Gules, resting the dexter paw upon a trefoil slipped Vert. Escutcheon Argent, a representation of a corrugated boiler-flue fesseways Proper, between two foxes courant Gules, each holding in their mouths a trefoil slipped Vert. Motto Forti nihil difficile
