= Emilia Fox =

English actress and presenter (born 1974)

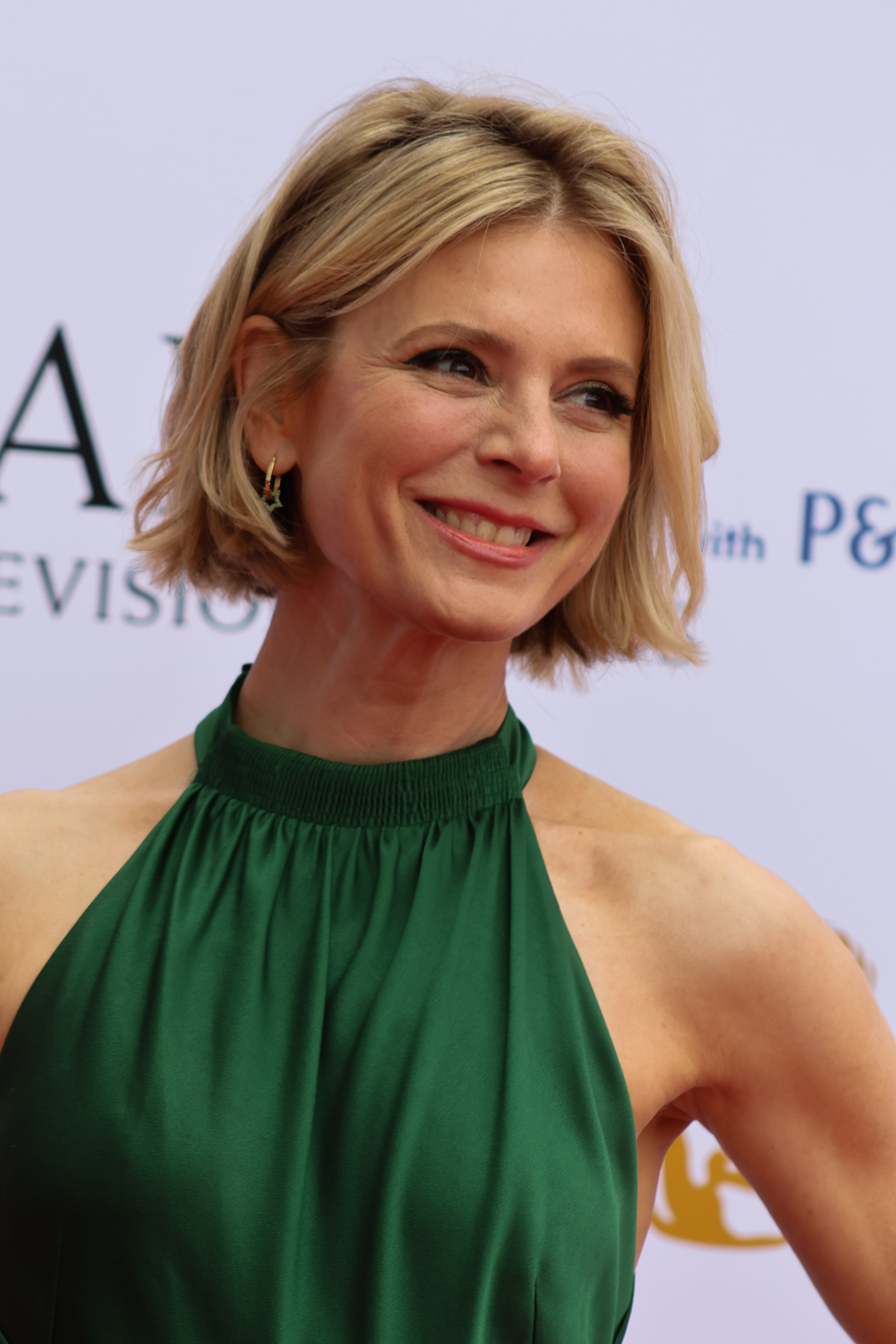
- Fox in 2026
- Born: Emilia Rose Elizabeth Fox; 31 July 1974 (age 52); Hammersmith, London, England
- Education: St Catherine's College, Oxford
- Occupations: Actress; presenter
- Years active: 1995–present
- Spouse: Jared Harris (m. 2005; div. 2010)
- Partner(s): Jeremy Gilley (2009–2011); Jonathan Stadlen (2021–2025)
- Children: 1
- Parents: Edward Fox; Joanna David
- Relatives: Freddie Fox (brother)
- Family: Fox
- Awards: Flaiano Prizes Best Actress; 2003 The Soul Keeper

Emilia Rose Elizabeth Fox (born 31 July 1974) is an English actress and presenter whose career is primarily in British television. Her feature film debut was in Roman Polanski's film The Pianist (2002). Her other motion pictures include the Italian–French–British romance-drama The Soul Keeper (2002), for which she won the Flaiano Film Award for Best Actress; the drama The Republic of Love (2003); the comedy-drama Things to Do Before You're 30 (2005); the black comedy Keeping Mum (2005); the romantic comedy-drama Cashback (2006); the drama Flashbacks of a Fool (2008); the drama Ways to Live Forever (2010); the drama-thriller A Thousand Kisses Deep (2011); and the fantasy-horror drama Dorian Gray (2009).

Fox's television roles include the BBC drama Pride and Prejudice (1995), the PBS British/German television serial Rebecca (1997), ITV Granada's Henry VIII (2003), BBC's Gunpowder, Treason & Plot (2004), the 2005 BBC miniseries The Virgin Queen (2005) and the ITV crime drama series Fallen Angel (2007). She also appeared as Morgause in the BBC's Merlin, beginning in the programme's second series. Fox also starred in Delicious (2016). She stars as Dr Nikki Alexander on the BBC crime drama Silent Witness, having joined the cast in 2004 following the departure of Amanda Burton. Fox is the longest-serving cast member since the departures of Tom Ward in 2012 and William Gaminara in 2013. Since 2022 she has had the title role of Sylvia Fox in the Acorn TV series Signora Volpe.

== Early life and education ==
Emilia Rose Elizabeth Fox was born on 31 July 1974 in Hammersmith, London. Her mother is actress Joanna David and her father is actor Edward Fox. Her uncle is actor James Fox, and her cousins Jack, Laurence, and Lydia are also actors. Her brother Freddie is also an actor, and she also has a half-sister, Lucy.

Her grandfather was Robin Fox, a theatrical agent. Her great-great-grandfather was Samson Fox, a self-made millionaire, and her great-grandmother was the actress Hilda Hanbury, sister of Lily Hanbury.

Fox was educated at the independent Bryanston School near Blandford Forum, Dorset, where she played the cello, and at St Catherine's College, Oxford, where she studied English.

== Career ==
Fox first appeared as Georgiana, the sister of Colin Firth's Mr. Darcy, in the 1995 television adaptation of Pride and Prejudice, followed by her role as the second Mrs. de Winter in the 1997 television adaptation of Rebecca, opposite Charles Dance. In 1998 she starred with Ben Miles in the adaptation of Catherine Cookson's The Round Tower as the young Vanessa Radcliffe, a girl from an affluent family who is forced to leave her home after becoming pregnant. Fox played Jeannie Hurst in the 2000 remake of Randall and Hopkirk.

In 2002, she starred in The Pianist as Dorota, a beautiful, blond, non-Jewish cellist who adores the playing of the Polish-Jewish pianist and composer Władysław Szpilman (played by Adrien Brody). The film was directed by Roman Polanski. In 2003, she played Jane Seymour in a two-part television biographical film about King Henry VIII. She also played the title role in Katherine Howard, directed by Robin Lefevre at the Chichester Festival Theatre in 1998.

In 2004, she joined the cast of the crime drama, Silent Witness. As of 2025, she is still in the show and has now played the role of Nikki Alexander for twenty-one years. 2004 also saw her play Lady Margaret in Part 2 of Gunpowder, Treason and Plot, the mini-series about James I (James VI in Scotland) and the Gunpowder Plot. In 2005, Fox appeared in the BBC miniseries The Virgin Queen, a four-part miniseries based upon the life of Queen Elizabeth I, Fox played Amy Dudley, the first wife of Robert Dudley, played by Tom Hardy, despite appearing in only one episode, her character remains a key character in the series. In 2008, she played Sister Jean in Baillie Walsh's Flashbacks of a Fool, which also featured Daniel Craig. She also starred in Things To Do Before You're 30 with Billie Piper, who would later marry her first cousin Laurence Fox; they divorced in 2016.

She was cast as Lynne Frederick in the 2004 film The Life and Death of Peter Sellers, which starred Geoffrey Rush in the lead role. A whole section of the film focusing on the Frederick/Sellers relationship was removed in the final edit, although she can be seen briefly in a background shot towards the end of the film. The deleted scenes with Fox can be found among the special features on the DVD release of the film.

In 2007, Fox was reunited with her Rebecca co-star Charles Dance when they starred together in the ITV1 mini-series Fallen Angel; Fox played a serial killer, Rosie Byfield, with Dance appearing as her father. The rewind format in which the show was shot traced the development of the killer streak of Fox's character. Fox and Dance had previously both appeared in ITV1's Henry VIII, but Dance's role as the Duke of Buckingham was limited, as his character was arrested for treason less than fifteen minutes into the first half, while Fox's scenes as the doomed third Queen Jane Seymour dominated the first half of the second episode. In the 2008 English language DVD re-release of the cult 2006 Norwegian animated film Free Jimmy, Fox voiced the character of "Bettina". The dialogue was written by Simon Pegg; other actors included Pegg himself and Woody Harrelson. Emilia Fox narrates the popular children's book We're Going on a Bear Hunt (by Michael Rosen and Helen Oxenbury) with Kevin Whately in a special edition book and DVD set. She appeared as Morgause in the second series of BBC's Merlin in 2009. She returned for the third and fourth series. The same year, she portrayed Queen Elizabeth II in the Channel 4 documentary The Queen.

She narrated the Doctor Who character Lady Winters in the Doctor Who Adventure Game, "The Gunpowder Plot", (2011). She had previously played Berenice in the Eighth Doctor audio drama "Nevermore'".

In 2015, she appeared as Julia Swetlove in the BBC's dramatisation of J. K. Rowling's book The Casual Vacancy. The following year, she appeared in series 2 of The Tunnel as Vanessa Hamilton. In 2016–18 she starred as Sam Vincent in Delicious, a Sky television drama. Silent Witness, in which Fox stars, resumed on BBC One in January 2018.

External videos
- In the Footsteps of Killers series 2 episode 1

In 2019, Fox co-presented the BBC documentary Jack the Ripper – The Case Reopened, alongside criminologist David Wilson. In 2021, Fox and Wilson teamed up to present a full series of documentaries looking at cold cases, titled In the Footsteps of Killers. The second series aired in January 2023, and the third in 2025.

== Personal life ==
In 2000, Fox was engaged to comedian Vic Reeves; she subsequently dated Toby Mott.

In July 2005, she married British actor Jared Harris. The couple announced their separation in 2008, and Harris filed for divorce in January 2009, following the breakdown of their long-distance relationship and her 2007 miscarriage.

Following her separation from Harris, Fox began a relationship with actor Jeremy Gilley, and in May 2010 it was reported that Fox was pregnant with their child. In November 2010, Fox gave birth to a daughter. Fox and Gilley split up in 2011.

She dated chef Marco Pierre White from 2012 to 2016 and Luc Chaudhary from 2019 to 2020. In 2026 she announced her split from TV producer Jonathan Stadlen, whom she dated from 2021 to 2025.

Fox is a patron of the drug, alcohol, and gambling addiction charity DrugFam.

== Filmography ==
=== Film ===
Year	Title	Role	Notes
1995	Pride and Prejudice	Geogiana Dacy	
1999	The Rat Trap	Pippa	Short film
2000	The Magic of Vincent	Gina	Short film
2002	The Pianist	Dorota	
2002	Hideous Man	Girl on swing	Short film
2002	The Soul Keeper	Sabina Spielrein	
2003	Three Blind Mice	Claire Bligh	
2003	The Republic of Love	Fay	
2004	The Life and Death of Peter Sellers	Lynne Frederick	Scenes deleted
2004	Cashback	Sharon	Short film later expanded into a full-length feature film
2005	Things to Do Before You're 30	Kate	
2005	The Tiger and the Snow	Nancy Browning	
2005	Keeping Mum	Rosie Jones	
2006	Free Jimmy	Bettina	Voice (English version)
2006	Cashback	Sharon Pintey	
2007	Honeymoon	Dawn	Short film
2008	Flashbacks of a Fool	Sister Jean	
2009	Dorian Gray	Lady Victoria Wotton	
2010	The Man Who Married Himself	Sarah	Short film
2010	Ways to Live Forever	Amanda McQueen (Mum)	
2011	A Thousand Kisses Deep	Doris	
2013	Suspension of Disbelief	Claire Jones	
2013	Not Ever	Emily	Short Film
2014	The Devil's Harvest	Nadya	
2016	The Carer	Sophia	
2017	Mum's List	Kate Greene	
2020	Blithe Spirit	Violet Bradman	
2022	The Beachcombers	Narrator	Short film

=== Television ===
Year	Title	Role	Notes
1995	Pride and Prejudice	Georgiana Darcy	TV miniseries
1997	Rebecca	The Second Mrs de Winter	TV film
1997	Bright Hair	Ann Devenish	TV film
1997	The Temptation of Franz Schubert	Karoline von Esterhazy	TV film
1998	The Round Tower	Vanessa Ratcliffe	TV serial
1998	Blink	Nicki	TV short
1998	Verdict	Charlie Moyes	Episode: "The Doctor's Opinion"
1999	The Round Tower	Vanessa Ratcliffe	TV film
1999	Shooting the Past	Spig	TV film
1999	The Scarlet Pimpernel	Minette Roland	Episode: "The Scarlet Pimpernel"
1999	David Copperfield	Clara Copperfield	TV film
2000	Other People's Children	Dale	Episode: "1.3"
2000	The Wrong Side of the Rainbow		TV series
2000–2001	Randall & Hopkirk	Jeannie	13 episodes
2001	Bad Blood	Jackie Shipton	TV film
2002	Coupling	Wilma Lettings	Episode: "Faithless"; Episode: "Unconditional Sex"
2003	Helen of Troy	Cassandra, Princess of Troy	TV film
2003	Henry VIII	Jane Seymour	TV film
2004	Gunpowder, Treason & Plot	Lady Margaret	TV film
2004–present	Silent Witness	Dr Nikki Alexander	156 episodes
2006	The Virgin Queen	Amy Dudley	TV miniseries
2006	Agatha Christie's Marple	Joanna Burton	Episode: "The Moving Finger"
2006	Born Equal	Laura	TV film
2007	Fallen Angel	Angel; Rosemary Byfield	Episode: "The Four Last Things"; Episode: "The Judgement of Strangers"
2007	Ballet Shoes	Sylvia Brown	TV film
2008	Consuming Passion: 100 Years of Mills & Boon	Kirstie, a 30-something university English lecturer	TV film dramatising Mills and Boon
2008	The Game's Up		TV film
2009	The Queen	Queen Elizabeth II	Episode: "Sisters"
2009–2011	Merlin	Morgause	11 episodes
2010	Bookaboo	Herself, reading a book	Episode: "The Spider and the Fly"
2012	Upstairs Downstairs	Lady Portia Alresford	Episode: "A Perfect Specimen of Womanhood"
2012	Falcón	Ines	Episode: "The Blind Man of Seville"
2013	The Wrong Mans	Scarlett	
2014	The Secrets		Episode: "The Lie"
2014	Would I Lie to You?	Herself	Series 8, Episode 4
2015	The Casual Vacancy	Julia Sweetlove	
2015	Bear Grylls: Mission Survive	Herself, contestant	Six-part TV series
2016	Home From Home	Penny Dillon	Pilot and BBC One sitcom
2016	Kew's Forgotten Queen	Presenter	BBC Four documentary
2016	The Tunnel	Vanessa Hamilton	Series 2
2016–2019	Delicious	Sam Vincent	Sky1 series
2016–2018, 2021	Ant & Dec's Saturday Night Takeaway	Herself	11 episodes
2018	Inside No. 9	Natasha	Series 4 Episode 3 "Once Removed"
2018	Strangers	Sally Porter	ITV drama
2019	The Snow Wolf: A Winter's Tale	Narrator	BBC Two Drama
2019	Jack the Ripper – The Case Reopened	Presenter	BBC One Documentary
2019	Celebrity Juice	Herself, Team Captain	Series 21, Episode 6 Series 22, Episode 3
2019–2020	The Trial of Christine Keeler	Valerie Profumo	BBC One series
2019–2020	Celebrity Gogglebox	Herself	Series 1 (With Laurence Fox) & Series 2 (With Joanna David)
2020	Top Gear	Herself	Series 28, Episode 4
2020	VE Day: The Lost Films	Herself	Narrator
2020	Richard & Judy: Keep Reading and Carry on	Herself	Episode 5
2020	Blankety Blank	Herself	Episode: "Christmas Special"
2021	Saturday Knight Takeaway	Herself	TV Short
2021	Paul Sinha's TV Showdown	Herself	Contestant – ITV
2021	Between the Covers	Herself	BBC2
2021–present	In the Footsteps of Killers	Herself	
2022	Murdertown	Herself	Crime & Investigation
2022	Royal Institution Christmas Lectures	Herself	Dame Sue Black: 1. Dead Body
2022–present	Signora Volpe	Sylvia Fox	Acorn TV / AMC series

== Theatre ==
Year	Title	Role	Notes
1996–1997	The Cherry Orchard	Anya	Royal Shakespeare Company
1998	Katherine Howard	Katherine Howard	Chichester Festival Theatre
1999	Good		Donmar Warehouse
2000	Richard II	Queen Isabel	Almeida Theatre
2000	Coriolanus	Virgilia	Almeida Theatre
2003–2004	Les Liaisons dangereuses	Madame de Tourvel	Playhouse Theatre
2014	Rapture, Blister, Burn	Catherine	Hampstead Theatre
2017	Sex with Strangers	Olivia	Hampstead Theatre
