= Royal Concert Hall =

The Royal Concert Hall may refer to:

- Glasgow Royal Concert Hall
- Nottingham Royal Concert Hall, part of the Royal Centre in Nottingham
- Stockholm Concert Hall in Stockholm, Sweden

== See also ==
- Royal Hall (disambiguation)
