= Royal Hall, Harrogate =

Theatre in North Yorkshire, England

Royal Hall
- Kursaal 1903–1914
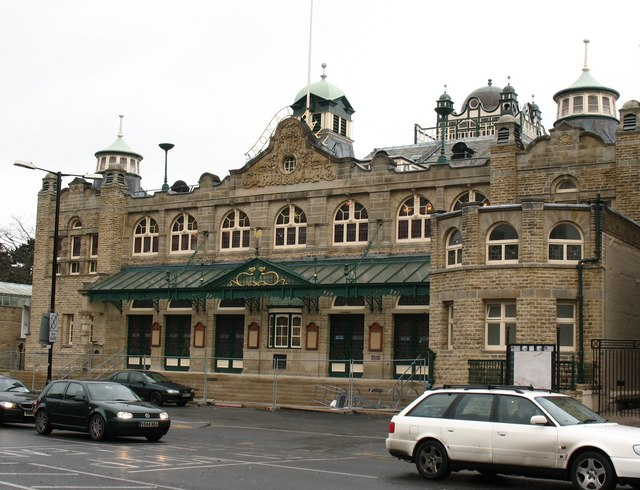
- Interactive map of Royal Hall
- Address: Harrogate, North Yorkshire
- Coordinates: 53.9955°N 1.5439°W
- Type: Kursaal/theatre

Construction
- Opened: 1903
- Rebuilt: 2006-2008
- Architect: Robert Beale/Frank Matcham

Listed Building – Grade II*
- Official name: Royal Hall
- Designated: 4 February 1975
- Reference no.: 1315842

Website
- royalhall.co.uk

The Royal Hall is a Grade II* listed performance hall and theatre, located in Harrogate, North Yorkshire, England.

With local benefactors led by engineering inventor Samson Fox, the building opened in 1903 as the Kursaal. It had been constructed on the site of the former Cheltenham Pump Room, as visitors to the town seeking the famed spa water, had declined in the latter half of the 19th century.

The Kursaal was designed by Robert Beale and Frank Matcham, one of the most prolific theatre architects of his time, it was loosely based on the design of the Ostend Kursall in Belgium. Kursaal is a German language word which translates literally as "Cure Hall", but was used for grand receptions and special occasions. A popular form of building in late 19th-century European spa destinations, the concept never caught on in the United Kingdom. Hence as World War I began, the theatre was renamed the more patriotic "Royal Hall".

In the 1950s, like many theatres converted into a cinema but looking for alternative uses, the venue helped in the formation and growth of Harrogate as a conference and exhibition centre. The Royal Hall is an important national heritage building, with Harrogate acknowledged as a top UK event destination and home to Harrogate International Centre. By 1997 the Royal Hall needed renovation, and in 2001, English Heritage put the building on the national "buildings at risk" register. The Harrogate Borough Council formed the Royal Hall Restoration Trust to raise the £10.7 million needed for the restoration. Supported by Edward Fox, a great-grandson of Samson Fox, donations were received from the Council, Harrogate International Centre, and the Heritage Lottery Fund, with the trust itself raising £2.7 million from local benefactors. This allowed for an authentic interior redecoration and the restoration of the dress circle. The patron of the Royal Hall Restoration Trust, Prince Charles, led the Hall's official re-opening on 22 January 2008.

Harrogate's Royal Hall has been the central venue within the Harrogate International Festivals portfolio, since the Festival was established in 1966, and in 2014 played host to J.K. Rowling's only UK appearance under the pseudonym Robert Galbraith.

In 2014, The International Gilbert and Sullivan Festival, an annual three-week theatre festival from the end of July through most of August, moved to Harrogate. In 2013, the Festival had sold more than 25,000 tickets by June. The Festival was held in Buxton from 1994 to 2013. It is an adjudicated competition among a dozen amateur Gilbert & Sullivan troupes, with professional performances given on the weekends, given in the Hall. There are also dozens of fringe events scheduled for the Harrogate Theatre and other venues.

== See also ==
- Grade II* listed buildings in North Yorkshire (district)
- Listed buildings in Harrogate (Low Harrogate Ward)
