= Robert Fox (producer) =

English theatre and film producer (1952–2026)

- Born: Robert Michael John Fox; 25 March 1952; Cuckfield, England
- Died: 20 March 2026 (aged 73); London, England
- Occupations: Film producer, theatre producer
- Years active: 1982–2026
- Spouses: Celestia Sporborg (m. 1975; div. 1990) Natasha Richardson (m. 1990; div. 1992) Fiona Golfar (m. 1996)
- Children: 5
- Parent(s): Robin Fox; Angela Worthington
- Relatives: Edward Fox (brother); James Fox (brother)
- Family: Fox

Robert Michael John Fox (25 March 1952 – 20 March 2026) was an English theatre and film producer, whose work included the 2002 film The Hours, a film for which he was nominated for an Academy Award.

== Early life ==
Robert Michael John Fox was born in Cuckfield, West Sussex, on 25 March 1952, the third son of theatrical agent Robin Fox and actress Angela Worthington. He is the younger brother of actors Edward Fox and James Fox. The actress Emilia Fox is his niece and the actors Laurence Fox and Freddie Fox are his nephews. His maternal grandfather was playwright Frederick Lonsdale. Fox was educated at Harrow School.

== Career ==
Fox was a theatrical producer in the West End and on Broadway for over four decades forming Robert Fox Ltd in 1980. His productions include Chess by Tim Rice, Benny Andersson and Bjorn Ulvaeus; Another Country; Burn This starring John Malkovich; the world premiere of Arthur Miller's The Ride Down Mt. Morgan; Edward Albee's Three Tall Women; many plays by David Hare: Skylight with Michael Gambon and Lia Williams, Amy's View with Judi Dench, and The Breath of Life with Maggie Smith and Judi Dench. Other Fox productions include Hedda Gabler, Closer by Patrick Marber, The Lady in the Van by Alan Bennett starring Maggie Smith and directed by Nicholas Hytner; a revival of Pinter's The Caretaker with Michael Gambon, Gypsy on Broadway; The Boy from Oz starring Hugh Jackman; The Pillowman by Martin McDonagh starring Billy Crudup and Jeff Goldblum.; The Vertical Hour by David Hare starring Julianne Moore and Bill Nighy, on Broadway and in the West End; Frost/Nixon by Peter Morgan with Frank Langella and Michael Sheen at the Gielgud Theatre; and David Bowie's musical Lazarus in New York and London.

He was later one of the lead producers of Good Night and Good Luck at the Winter Garden Theatre in 2025 starring George Clooney, which now holds the record for the highest grossing play on Broadway of all time. He produced the 2025 revival of Chess on Broadway starring Lea Michele. He was involved in the producing team of the new Florence Welch musical, Gatsby: An American Myth.

Fox executive-produced the film of Closer, directed by Mike Nichols and starring Julia Roberts, Jude Law, Clive Owen and Natalie Portman. Before that, he produced The Hours with Scott Rudin, directed by Stephen Daldry, starring Nicole Kidman, Meryl Streep and Julianne Moore; and Iris (Miramax/Mirage) directed by Richard Eyre, starring Judi Dench, Kate Winslet and Jim Broadbent, both of which garnered Oscars in 2003. Other credits include executive producer on Another Country; a television film of Suddenly, Last Summer with Maggie Smith; and A Month by the Lake for starring Vanessa Redgrave, Edward Fox and Uma Thurman. He co-produced Notes on a Scandal for Fox Searchlight starring Cate Blanchett and Judi Dench.

He was executive producer on all series of Netflix's The Crown.

== Personal life and death ==
Fox was married to Fiona Golfar, with whom he has two children. He was previously married to Celestia Sporborg, with whom he has three children, and to the actress Natasha Richardson from 1990 to 1992. Fox died from prostate cancer at his home in London on 20 March 2026, aged 73.
