= Hyde Park pet cemetery =

Disused animal burial ground in London

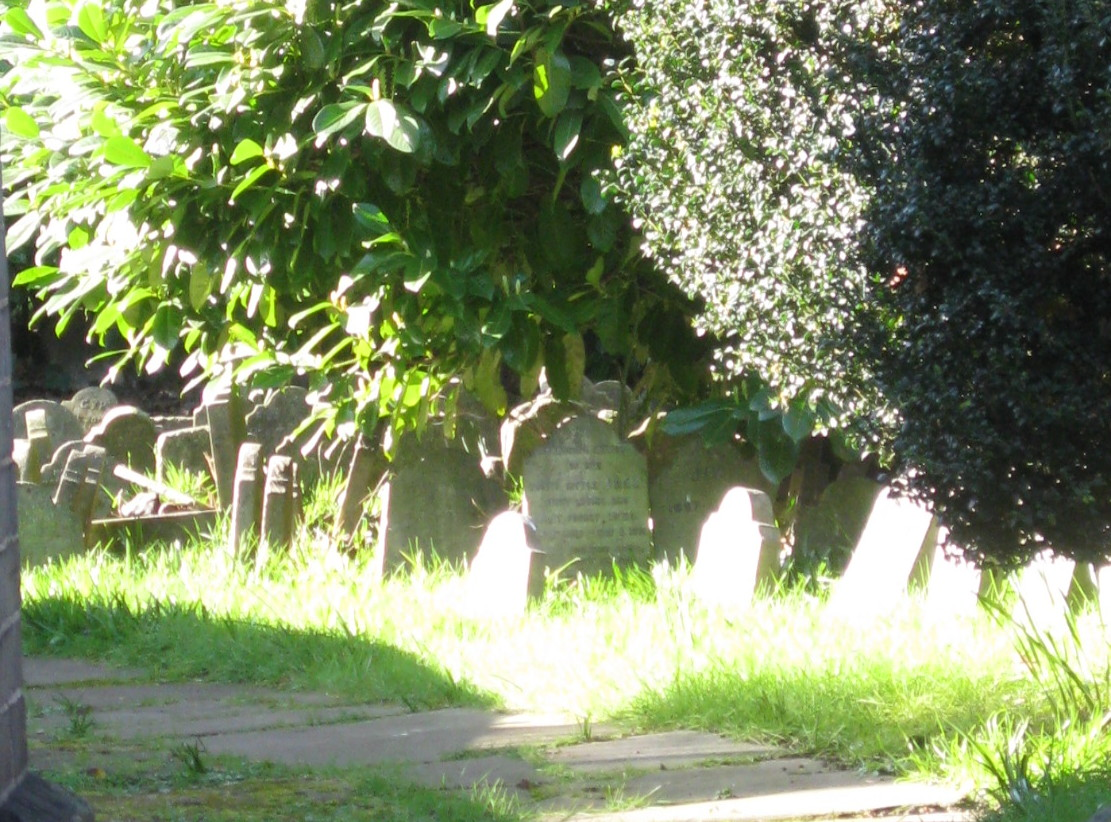
- Interactive map of Hyde Park pet cemetery

Details
- Established: 1880–1881
- Location: Hyde Park, London
- Country: United Kingdom
- Coordinates: 51°30′42″N 0°10′22″W
- Type: Pet cemetery
- Owned by: The Royal Parks
- Size: Around 1,000 burials
- Website: shop.royalparks.org.uk/walking-tour-secret-pet-cemetery

The Hyde Park pet cemetery (originally the London Hyde Park Dog Cemetery and advertised as The Secret Pet Cemetery of Hyde Park) is a disused burial ground for animals in Hyde Park, London. It was established in 1880 or 1881 in the garden of Victoria Lodge, home of one of the park keepers. The cemetery became popular after the burial of a dog belonging to Sarah Fairbrother, wife of Prince George, Duke of Cambridge. Some 1,000 burials were carried out before the cemetery was generally closed in 1903; sporadic burials were carried out thereafter until 1976. Most of the animals are dogs, though some cats, monkeys and birds were also buried. The site is owned by the charity The Royal Parks and not open to the public except as part of occasional tours.

== Origins ==
The cemetery lies in the garden of Victoria Lodge, a mid-19th century single-storey structure that provided accommodation for the keep of the park's Victoria Gate. A 1912 article in The Animals' Guardian by L Gordon-Stables attributes the foundation of the cemetery to Prince Arthur, Duke of Connaught and Strathearn in 1880 but more recent sources place its foundation with the burial of a dog named Cherry in 1881. Cherry was a Maltese dog that belonged to the children of Mr and Mrs J. Lewis Barned. Cherry and the Barned family often visited Hyde Park and were friendly with Mr Winbridge, the keeper of Victoria Lodge, from whom they would often buy refreshments and visit the lodge garden. Cherry died of old age on 28 April 1881 and Winbridge agreed to bury the animal in the lodge garden.

The second burial was that of Prince, the dog of Sarah Fairbrother, wife of Prince George, Duke of Cambridge. Prince was crushed under a carriage wheel near Victoria Lodge in June 1882, a not uncommon fate for dogs in the park during this period. Winbridge, a former servant of the duke, brought Prince into the lodge where he died and afterwards buried him in the garden.

== Operation and closure ==
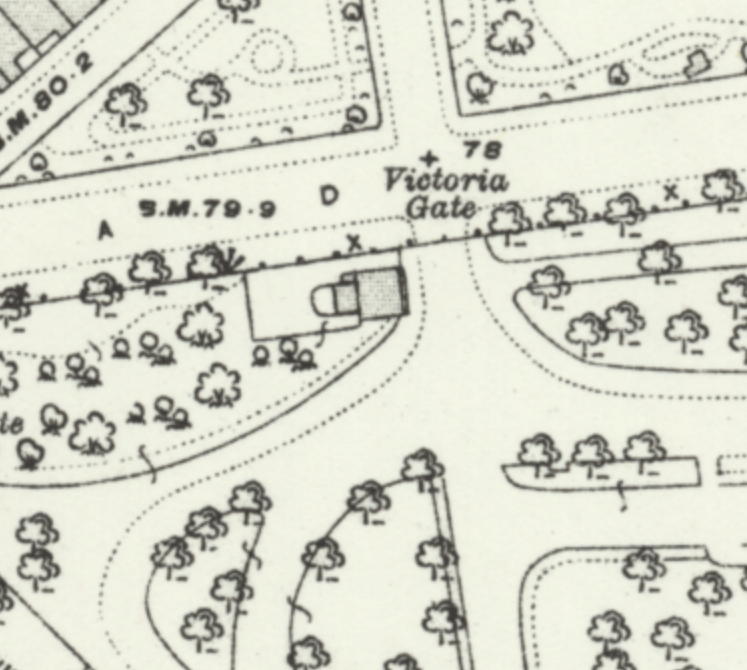
Victoria lodge and garden on a 1914 map

During the 1880s pet cemeteries were considered a German custom and they did not become widely available in England until later in the century. The burial of Prince brought publicity to the lodge and Winbridge opened his garden for other burials. The lodge garden, originally known as the London Hyde Park Dog Cemetery, became among the first public pet cemeteries in England (previously country estates often had specific areas where family pets were buried). Winbridge would sew the animals into canvas bags and carry out the interment himself. The pets largely belonged to upper-class families who lived in the streets near to the park. The owners were mainly women and most chose not to be present for the burial.

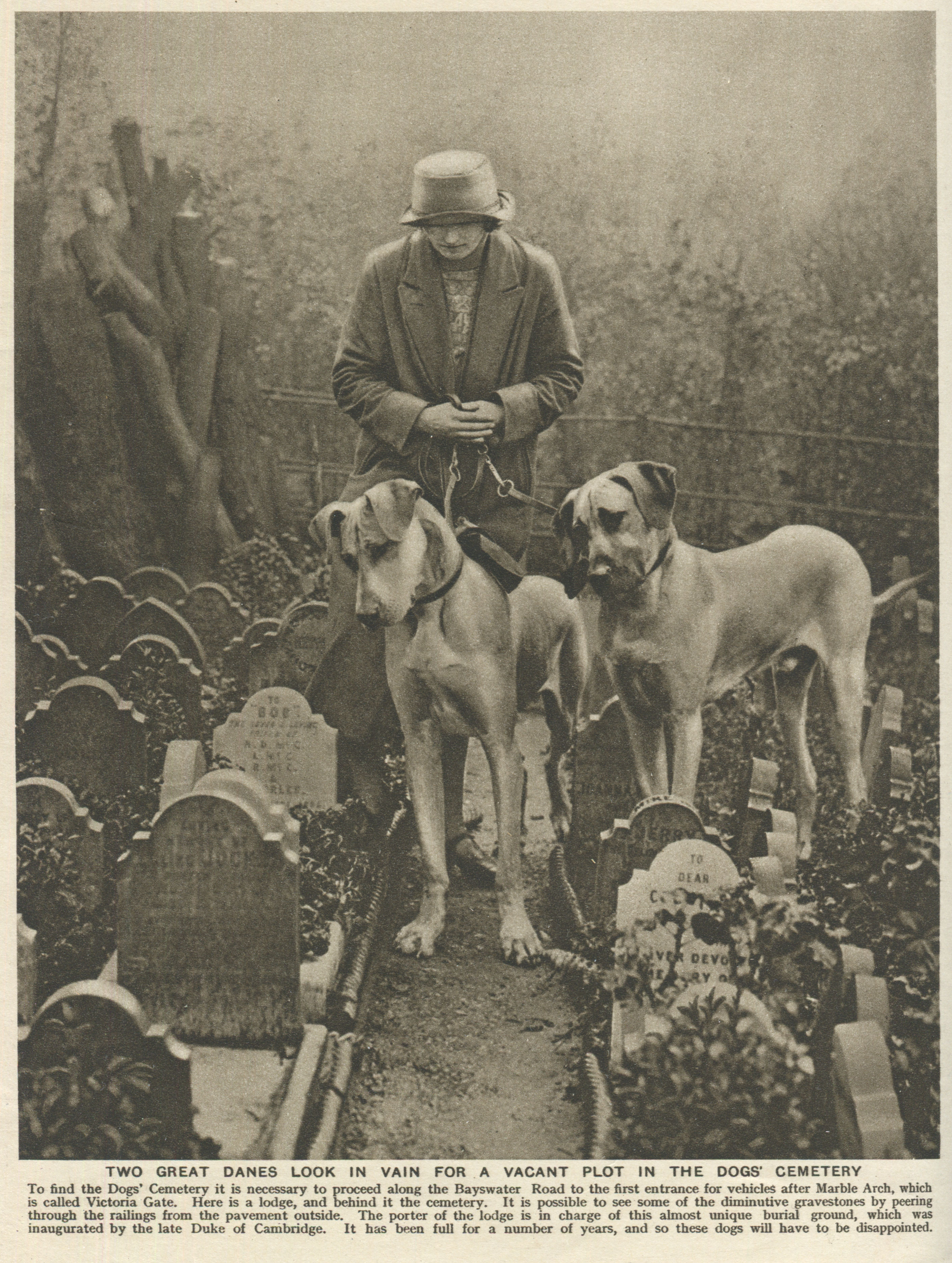
The cemetery in 1927

The cemetery was modelled after its human equivalent and many animals were buried under miniature headstones. The gravestones are almost uniform in size being approximately 31 centimetres (12 in) high, 24 centimetres (9.4 in) wide and 5 centimetres (2.0 in) thick. The gravestones are generally plain with only six surviving with any decorative elements. The burial markers are typical of early pet gravestones, which remained generally small and plain until the mid-20th century. Many of the graves have kerbstones and body stones, reflecting a similar trend in human burials of the late 19th and early 20th centuries. The text on the headstones also mirrors human gravestones and many include the phrases "here lies..." or "rest in peace". Sleep metaphors, which first became common on human gravestones in this period, were also popular and examples include "After life's fitful slumber, he sleeps well" and "We are only sleeping, Master". Some headstones are marked with bible passages and studies have cited this as early evidence of a belief that animals had souls, a belief that did not become commonplace until the later 20th-century.

Winbridge operated the cemetery as a philanthropic gesture and not as a commercial business. By 1893 39 burials had been carried out by Winbridge, who remained the keeper. He beautified the surroundings with planting. The cemetery became popular "by accident" and by the time it was largely closed in 1903, due to lack of space, it had received around 1,000 burials. After the general closure occasional burials were made of the pets of well-connected owners; these were made in gaps in the existing rows of headstones or near to the fence. One of the last burials was Kim, a cat who died in 1953. The last burial was carried out in 1976.

Burials included two cats, three monkeys and a number of birds. Topper, a Fox Terrier belonging to the park's Metropolitan Police station was also buried in the cemetery. William Petre, 13th Baron Petre sent a dog for burial at the park and promised to attend the ceremony but died overnight, allegedly of grief for his animal. George Orwell later visited the cemetery which he described as "perhaps the most horrible spectacle in Britain".

Some 471 headstones are known in the cemetery and many are marked with burial dates. Only five headstones are marked with dates in the 1880s, 255 with the 1890s, 70 with the 1900s and only 23 with later dates. The 1976 burial was the only one carried out after the 1950s.

== Current status ==
Since its closure the cemetery, which is owned by the charity The Royal Parks, has been maintained as a heritage site but is off limits to the public due to the risk of vandalism. The garden is now largely vegetated with ivy and ferns. It is visible through railings from publicly-accessible spaces near the Victoria Gate. It was formerly opened to the public on one day a year as part of Open House London. Tours of the cemetery and some nearby areas are currently sold by The Royal Parks for limited days each year at a cost of £10 per person. It is advertised as "The Secret Pet Cemetery of Hyde Park".
