= Hilda Hanbury =

British actress and stage beauty (1875–1961)

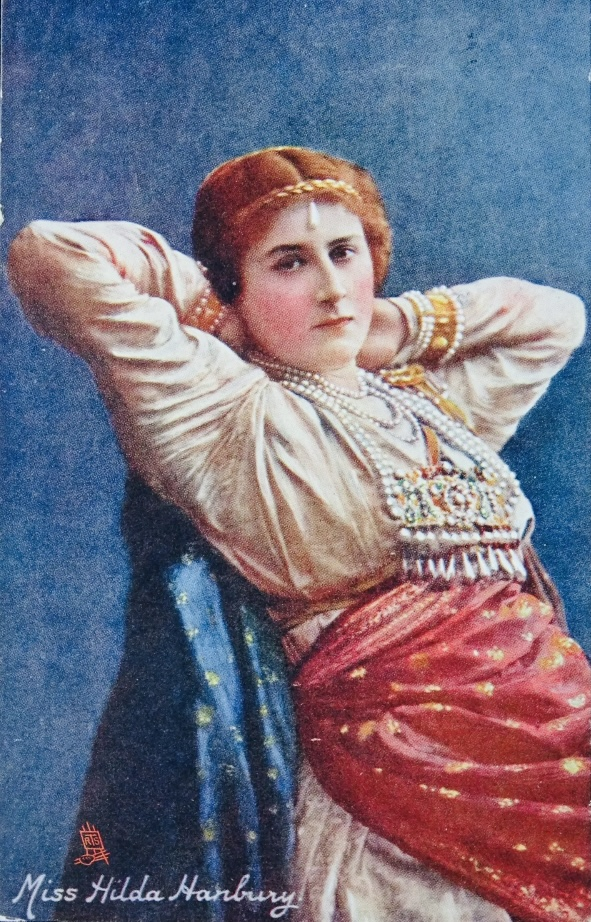
Hilda Hanbury in 1904

Hilda Louise Hanbury (née Alcock; 16 January 1875–23 December 1961) was a British actress and stage beauty. Her grandsons are Edward, James, and Robert Fox, while her great-grandchildren include Emilia, Laurence, Jack and Freddie Fox.

== Early life ==
Hanbury was born in St Pancras, London, to surveyor and estate agent Matthew Henry Alcock (1841–1911) and his wife Elisabeth née Davis (1845–1916). Her older sister Lily Hanbury (1873–1908) was also an actress. Their cousin was actress Julia Neilson.

Lily and Hilda had a pet dog named "Wobbles" who died in 1900 and is buried in Hyde Park pet cemetery. A report in the London journal The Wheelwoman & Society Cycling News of 14 August 1897 states that Hilda and her sister learned to ride bicycles at the Empire Cycle School in Tavistock Place, which was unusual for women of the time.

== Career and later life ==
Hilda Hanbury commenced her stage career in various London music halls. In 1891, as a teenager, she made her stage debut as Nancy Ditch in Robert Williams Buchanan's play Miss Tomboy in London's West End. She was also seen on stage as a member of Herbert Beerbohm Tree’s theatrical company, which she joined in 1892. She appeared in Fédora with the Beerbohm Tree Company at the Theatre Royal Haymarket in London (1894–1895), also appearing with them on an 1895 American tour in New York City

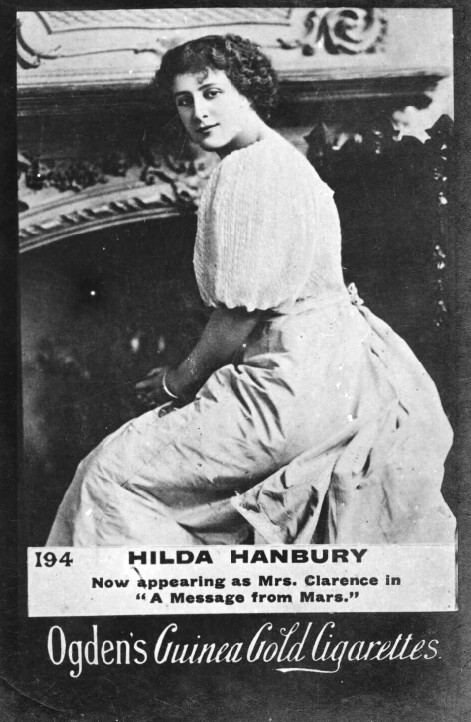
Cigarette card as Mrs. Clarence in the comedy A Message from Mars (1900)

Her stage roles included the role of Mrs. Clarence in Richard Ganthony's fantastic comedy A Message from Mars, which premiered in 1899 and was very successful at the time. In August/September 1901 she appeared at the Imperial Theatre in London as Mrs. Prescott in Boyle Lawrence's military drama A Man of His Word opposite H. B. Irving. She was also part of the American premiere cast of the play A Bunch of Violets by Sydney Grundy at Abbey's Theatre in New York in February 1895 with the role of Countess Volkker. She was regarded as a 'stage beauty' and photographs, postcards and cigarette cards of her were available from the late 1890s, indicating her popularity. Unlike her sister Lily Hanbury, however, she mostly played small roles.

She retired from the stage following her marriage to Arthur William Fox (1870–1956) on 9 February 1905 at St Giles Church in London. Fox was of independent means and the couple settled down to a comfortable life in Mayfair in a 16-room house with nine servants. One of their four children was the actor and theatrical agent Robin Fox (1913–1971). Her grandsons are Edward, James, and Robert Fox. Her great-grandchildren include Emilia, Laurence, Jack and Freddie Fox.

After her divorce from Arthur Fox in 1923, because of his adultery with an American woman, Hanbury and her children had financial difficulties. In her later years, Hanbury lived with her daughters Mary Fox (1907 – after 2011) and Pam Fox (1921 – after 2011) in St Austell, Cornwall, where she died in December 1961 at the age of 86.
