= James Fox =

English actor (born 1939)

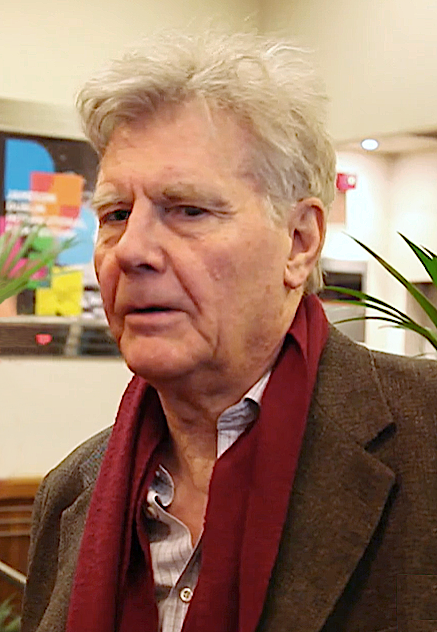
- Fox in 2014
- Born: William Fox; 19 May 1939 (age 87); London, England
- Years active: 1950–1970, 1981–present
- Spouse: Mary Elizabeth Piper (m. 1973; died 2020)
- Children: 5, including Jack and Laurence
- Parent: Robin Fox (father)
- Relatives: Edward Fox (brother); Robert Fox (brother); Richard Ayoade (son-in-law)
- Family: Fox

James William Fox (born William Fox; 19 May 1939) is an English actor, known for his work in film and television. He is a member of the Fox family of actors. Fox's career began in the 1960s through leading roles in films such as The Servant (1963), King Rat (1965), Those Magnificent Men in Their Flying Machines (1965), Thoroughly Modern Millie (1967), and Performance (1970).

In the 1970s, Fox took a break from acting to focus on personal and spiritual matters, returning to acting in the early 1980s. Over time, he built a reputation for playing a variety of roles, including upper-class figures and more serious characters, notably in known for his roles in A Passage to India (1984), Patriot Games (1992), The Remains of the Day (1993), Jinnah (1998), Sherlock Holmes (2009), and Effie Gray (2014).

Fox won the BAFTA Award for Most Promising Newcomer to Leading Film Roles for his performance in The Servant, and was nominated for Best Actor in a Supporting Role for A Passage to India. He is also a Golden Globe Award nominee.

== Early life ==
William Fox was born on 19 May 1939 in London, the second son of theatrical agent Robin Fox and actress Angela Worthington. His elder brother is actor Edward Fox and his younger brother was film producer Robert Fox. Fox's maternal grandfather was playwright Frederick Lonsdale. He applied successfully to study acting at the Central School of Speech and Drama.

== Career ==
=== Early career ===
Fox first appeared on film as 11-year-old Toby Miniver in The Miniver Story in 1950. His early screen appearances, both in film and television, were made under his birth name, William Fox.

Fox appeared in the film The Loneliness of the Long Distance Runner (1962). His father, Robin, quarrelled bitterly with Tony Richardson over this, having attempted to forbid his friend from giving his son James (known as "Willie") a part in the film. His father claimed Willie had no talent for acting and should not give up his job in a bank.

In 1964, Fox won a BAFTA Award for Most Promising Newcomer to Leading Film Roles for The Servant (1963), working alongside Dirk Bogarde, Sarah Miles, and Wendy Craig. On 16 June 1965, Ken Annakin's period aviation film Those Magnificent Men in Their Flying Machines was released. In this British period comedy film, Fox is featured among an international ensemble cast including Stuart Whitman, Sarah Miles, Robert Morley, Terry-Thomas, Red Skelton, Benny Hill, Jean-Pierre Cassel, Gert Fröbe and Alberto Sordi. Some of the other films he acted in during this time are King Rat (1965), The Chase (1966), Thoroughly Modern Millie (1967), Isadora (1968), and Performance (1970).

=== Spiritual life and break from acting ===
After finishing work on Performance (released 1970, but shot in 1968), Fox suspended his acting career. The film, which starred Fox and Mick Jagger, was deemed so outrageous that critics at a preview screening walked out, with one film executive's wife reportedly throwing up in the cinema.

In a 2008 interview, Fox said: "It was just part of my journey...I think my journey was to spend a while away from acting. And I never lost contact with it – watching movies, reading about it ... so I didn't feel I missed it."

Fox became an evangelical Christian, working with the Navigators and devoting himself to the ministry. During this time, the only film in which Fox appeared was No Longer Alone (1976), the story of Joan Winmill Brown, a suicidal woman who was led to faith in Jesus Christ by Ruth Bell Graham.

=== Return to acting ===
After an absence from acting of several years, in 1981 Fox appeared on television in the Play for Today "Country" by Trevor Griffiths, a comedy drama set against the 1945 UK parliamentary elections. On film he starred in Stephen Poliakoff's Runners (1983), A Passage to India (1984), and Comrades (1986). He played Anthony Blunt in the BBC play by Alan Bennett, A Question of Attribution (1992). He also portrayed the character of Lord Holmes in Patriot Games (1992), as well as Colonel Ferguson in Farewell to the King (1989) and the Nazi-sympathising aristocrat Lord Darlington in The Remains of the Day (1993).

Fox has since appeared in the 2000 film Sexy Beast, the 2001 adaptation of The Lost World as Prof. Leo Summerlee, Agatha Christie's Poirot – Death on the Nile (2004) as Colonel Race, and Charlie and the Chocolate Factory (2005) as Mr. Salt, Veruca Salt's father. He appeared in the Doctor Who audio drama Shada, and in 2007, Fox guest-starred in the British television crime series Waking the Dead. He also appeared opposite his son Laurence Fox in "Allegory of Love", an episode in the third series of Lewis. He was part of the cast of Sherlock Holmes (2009), as Sir Thomas, leading member of a freemason-like secret society.

In 2010, Fox filmed Cleanskin, a terrorist thriller directed by Hadi Hajaig. The following year, he played King George V in the film W.E., written and directed by Madonna. In 2013, Fox played a lead role alongside Natalie Dormer in the movie A Long Way from Home.

== Personal life ==
Fox married Mary Elizabeth Piper in September 1973, with whom he has five children, including Laurence and Jack. Piper died at their home on 19 April 2020.

Through his daughter Lydia, Fox's son-in-law is actor Richard Ayoade. His former daughter-in-law is actress Billie Piper, who was married to his son Laurence from 2007 to 2016.

== Filmography ==
=== Film ===
Year	Title	Role	Notes
1950	The Miniver Story	Toby Miniver	
1950	The Magnet	Johnny Brent	
1962	The Loneliness of the Long Distance Runner	Gunthorpe	
1963	Tamahine	Oliver	
1963	The Servant	Tony	
1965	King Rat	Flight Lieutenant Peter Marlowe	
1965	Those Magnificent Men in Their Flying Machines	Richard Mays	
1966	The Chase	Jason 'Jake' Rogers	
1967	Thoroughly Modern Millie	Jimmy Smith	
1967	Arabella	Giorgio	
1968	Duffy	Stephane Calvert	
1968	Isadora	Gordon Craig	
1970	Performance	Chas Devlin	
1983	Runners	Tom Lindsay	
1984	Greystoke: The Legend of Tarzan, Lord of the Apes	Lord Charles Esker	
1984	A Passage to India	Cyril Fielding	
1986	Absolute Beginners	Henley of Mayfair	
1986	The Whistle Blower	Lord	
1986	Comrades	Governor William Norfolk	
1987	High Season	Patrick	
1989	Farewell to the King	Colonel Ferguson	
1989	The Mighty Quinn	Thomas Elgin	
1990	The Russia House	Ned	
1991	Afraid of the Dark	Frank	
1992	Patriot Games	Lord William Holmes	
1993	The Remains of the Day	Lord Darlington	
1997	Anna Karenina	Aleksei Aleksandrovich Karenin	
1997	Never Ever	Arthur Trevane	
1998	Shadow Run	Landon-Higgins	
1998	Jinnah	Mountbatten	
1999	Mickey Blue Eyes	Philip Cromwell	
2000	Up at the Villa	Sir Edgar Swift	
2000	Sexy Beast	Harry	
2000	The Golden Bowl	Colonel Bob Assingham	
2001	Lover's Prayer	Old Vladimir (voice)	
2001	The Mystic Masseur	Mr. Stewart	
2004	The Prince and Me	King Haraald	
2005	Charlie and the Chocolate Factory	Rupert Salt	
2007	Mister Lonely	The Pope	
2009	Sherlock Holmes	Sir Thomas Rotheram	
2010	Wide Blue Yonder	George	
2011	W.E.	King George V	
2012	Cleanskin	Sir Scott Catesby	
2013	A Long Way From Home	Joseph	
2013	The Double	The Colonel	
2013	Effie Gray	Sir Charles Eastlake	
2018	Surviving Christmas with the Relatives	Uncle John	
2021	The Souvenir Part II	Musical Narrator (voice)	Cameo appearance

=== Television ===
Year	Title	Role	Notes
1959	Armchair Theatre	Jay Minton	Episode: Light from a Star
1981	Play for Today	Philip Carlion	Episode: Country
1982	Nancy Astor	Waldorf Astor	TV Mini-series
1983	Anna Pavlova	Victor Dandré	
1983	The Road to 1984	George Orwell	TV movie
1989	She's Been Away	Hugh Ambrose	TV movie
1990	Never Come Back	Foster	TV Mini-series
1992	A Question of Attribution	Sir Anthony Blunt	TV movie
1993	Heart of Darkness	Gosse	TV movie
1994	The Dwelling Place	Lord Fischel	TV Mini-series, 3 episodes
1994	Doomsday Gun	Sir James Whittington	TV movie
1994	The Old Curiosity Shop	The Single Gentleman	TV Mini-series
1995	The Choir	The Dean, Hugh Cavendish	TV Mini-series, 5 episodes
1996	Gulliver's Travels	Dr. Bates	TV Mini-series
2001	Armadillo	Sir Simon Sherrifmuir	
2001	The Lost World	Prof. Leo Summerlee	TV movie
2002	The Falklands Play	Lord Carrington KCMG MC PC (Foreign Secretary)	
2003	Cambridge Spies	Lord Halifax	TV Mini-series
2003	Hans Christian Andersen: My Life as a Fairytale	Jonas Collin	TV movie
2004	Agatha Christie's Poirot	Colonel Race	Episode: Death on the Nile
2005	Agatha Christie's Marple	Colonel Arthur Bantry	Episode: The Body in the Library
2005	Colditz	Lt. Colonel Jimmy Fordham	TV Mini-series
2005	Absolute Power	Gerald Thurnham	Episode: Identity Crisis
2006	Suez: A Very British Crisis	Anthony Eden	TV documentary
2007	Waking the Dead	Dr Bruno Rivelli	Episode: Mask of Sanity
2008	New Tricks	Ian Figgis	Episode: Spare Parts
2009	Lewis	Professor Norman Dearing	Episode: Allegory of Love
2009	Margaret	Charles Powell	TV movie
2009	Red Riding 1980	Philip Evans	TV movie
2010	Midsomer Murders	Sir Michael Fielding	Episode: Master Class
2011	Law & Order: UK	Dr. Edward Austen	Episode: The Wrong Man
2012	Merlin	King Rodor	Episode: Another's Sorrow
2013	Utopia	The Assistant	6 episodes
2013	The Great Train Robbery	Henry Brooke	TV movie
2013	Downton Abbey	Lord Aysgarth	Episode: The London Season
2014	Unknown Heart	Ludlow	
2014	1864	Lord Palmerston	Miniseries
2015	Death in Paradise	Martin Goodman	2 episodes
2015	London Spy	James	Episode: Blue
