= Lily Hanbury =

English actress (1873–1908)

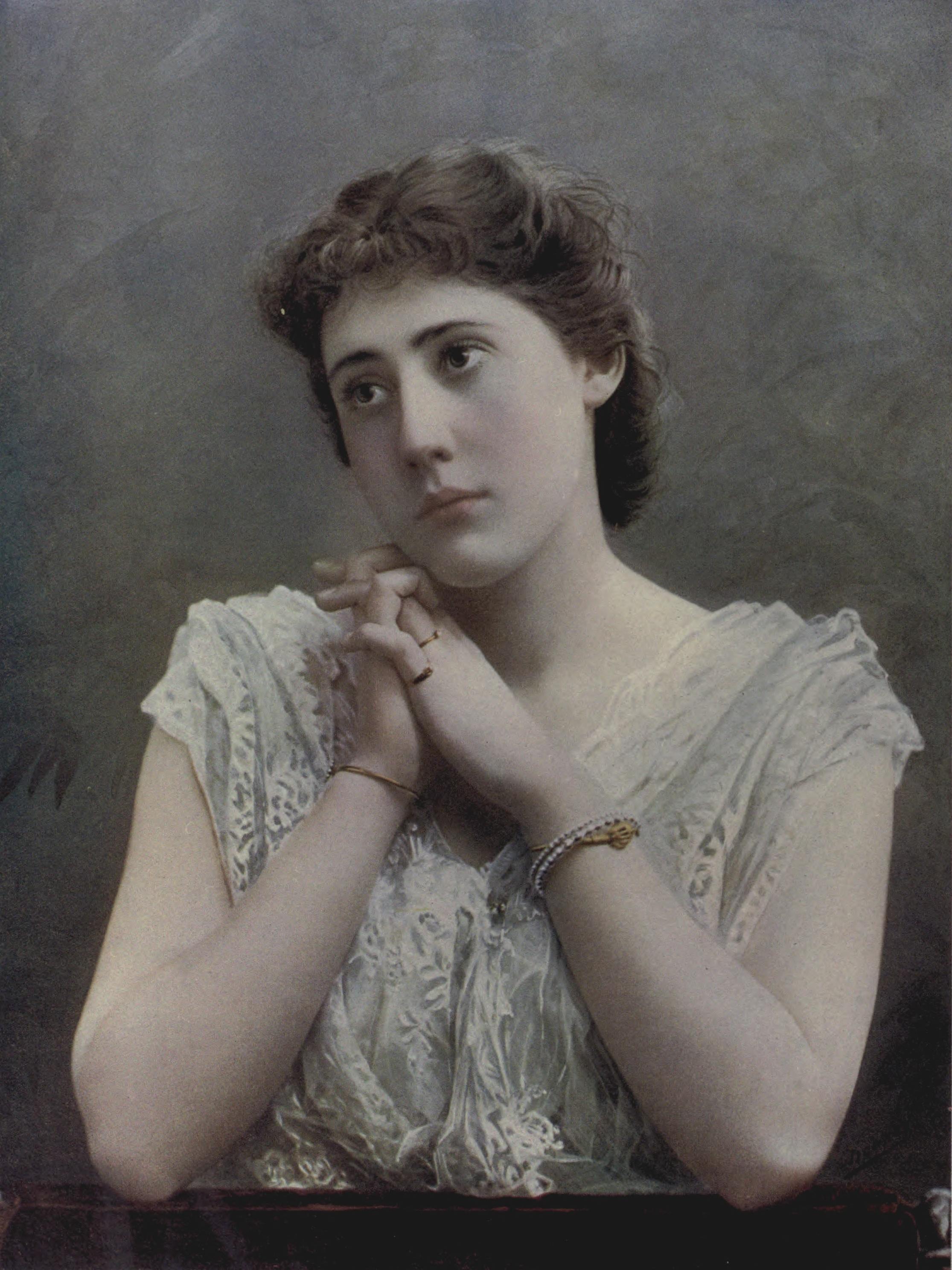
- Portrait of Hanbury c. 1895–1900
- Born: Lilian Florence Alcock; 1873; St Pancras, London, England
- Died: 5 March 1908 (aged 34–35); St Giles, London, England
- Resting place: Willesden Jewish Cemetery
- Spouse: Herbert Guedella (m. 1905)

Lily Hanbury (born Lilian Florence Alcock; 1873 – 5 March 1908) was an English actress.

== Biography ==
Lily Hanbury was the daughter of Elizabeth (née Davis) and Matthew Henry Alcock. Hanbury's younger sister, Hilda, who was also an actress and a member of Beerbohm Tree's theatrical company, is the grandmother of Edward Fox and James Fox and the great-grandmother of Freddie, Emilia, and Laurence Fox.

Lily and her sister Hilda had a pet dog named "Wobbles" who died in 1900 and is buried in Hyde Park pet cemetery.

Educated in London, Hanbury's début was in an 1888 revival of W. S. Gilbert's Pygmalion and Galatea; later she appeared on most of the leading English stages.

Her extensive career included playing Countess Wintersen in The Stranger, Hetty Preene in G. R. Sims's Lights o' London, Jessica Hunter in Clyde Fitch's The Climbers, and Petra in Ibsen's Enemy of the People. Hanbury reached the peak of her popularity by playing a parts in Shakespearean plays, mainly under the management of Wilson Barrett and Herbert Beerbohm Tree.

On 18 April 1905 she married chartered accountant Herbert Guedella (1874–1940) at the Register Office in Hanover Square. She gave her age as 29 years when she was actually aged 32 years.

Hanbury died on 5 March 1908, from medical complications following a stillbirth. Her remains were cremated and her ashes interred at Willesden Jewish Cemetery.
