= 1989 in the United Kingdom =

Events from the year 1989 in the United Kingdom.

== Incumbents ==
- Monarch – Elizabeth II
- Prime Minister – Margaret Thatcher (Conservative)

== Events ==
=== January ===
- 4 January – A memorial service is held for the 270 people who died in the Lockerbie air disaster two weeks ago. Margaret Thatcher and several other world political leaders are among more than 200 people present in the church service at the village of Old Dryfesdale near Lockerbie.
- 8 January – 44 people are killed in the Kegworth air disaster.
- 11 January
  - Accident investigators say that the Kegworth air disaster was caused when pilot Kevin Hunt, who survived the crash, accidentally shut down the wrong engine.
  - Abbey National building society offers free shares to its 5,500,000 members.
- 14 January – Muslims demonstrate in Bradford against The Satanic Verses, a book written by Salman Rushdie, burning copies of the book in the city streets.
- 19 January – Unemployment fell by 66,000 in December, to a nine-year low of just more than 2 million. It was last at this level in 1980.
- 25 January – John Cleese wins a libel case after the Daily Mirror described him as having become like his character Basil Fawlty in the sitcom Fawlty Towers.
- 27 January – Aviation pioneer Sir Thomas Sopwith dies aged 101 at his home in Hampshire.

=== February ===
- 5 February – At 6pm, the world's first commercial DBS system, Sky Television goes on air. Three new services – Sky News, Sky Movies and Eurosport – with the fourth being Sky Channel.
- 11 February – ITV airs the first episode of Home and Away, an Australian soap which was launched in its homeland last year.
- 12 February – Belfast lawyer Pat Finucane is murdered by the Ulster Defence Association.
- 14 February – Ayatollah Ruhollah Khomeini of Iran places a fatwa with an order to kill on author Salman Rushdie following the publication of his controversial book The Satanic Verses, which has caused outrage among the Islamic community of Britain.
- 19 February – The Industrial Society offices at 3 Carlton House Terrace in London are severely damaged by fire.
- 20 February – Clive Barracks is damaged in a bombing.
- 23 February
  - By-elections are held in Richmond (North Yorkshire) and Pontypridd in Wales following the departure of Conservative MP Leon Brittan to the European Commission, and the death of Labour MP Brynmor John on Boxing Day 1988 respectively. 27-year-old William Hague wins Richmond for the Conservatives, and Kim Howells wins Pontypridd for Labour.
  - Den Watts, the hugely popular character played by Leslie Grantham in the BBC's soap opera EastEnders, departs from the series (which he joined at its inception four years ago) as the character fakes his death in an episode watched by more than 20 million viewers.

=== March ===
- 4 March – Purley rail crash: two trains collide at Purley, Surrey killing six people.
- 6 March – Two people are killed in the Glasgow Bellgrove rail accident.
- 7 March – Iran breaks off diplomatic relations with the UK over Salman Rushdie's controversial book The Satanic Verses.
- 16 March – Unemployment is now below 7% for the first time in eight years, but still remains marginally more than 2 million.
- 17 March – The three men convicted of murdering paperboy Carl Bridgewater in Staffordshire 10 years ago have their appeals rejected. A fourth man convicted in connection with the killing died in prison in 1981.
- 20 March – Chief Superintendent Harry Breen and Superintendent Bob Buchanan of the Royal Ulster Constabulary are killed by the IRA.
- 26 March – Nigel Mansell wins the Brazilian Grand Prix.

=== April ===
- 5 April – 500 workers on the Channel Tunnel go on strike in a protest against pay and working conditions.
- 6 April – The government announces an end to the legislation which effectively guarantees secure work for more than 9,000 dockers over the remainder of their working lives.
- 10 April – Nick Faldo becomes the first English winner of the Masters Tournament in golf.
- 14 April – Ford launches the third generation of its Fiesta, the first to offer a 5-door version which is being built at the Dagenham plant in England and the Valencia plant in Spain.
- 15 April – 94 people are killed in the Hillsborough disaster during the FA Cup semi-final at the Hillsborough Stadium in Sheffield during the FA Cup semi-final between Nottingham Forest FC and Liverpool F.C.; three more will die later of serious injuries received and around 300 others are hospitalised. The death toll is the worst of any sporting disaster in Britain. The youngest victim is a 10-year-old boy, the oldest is 67-year-old Gerard Baron, brother of the late former Liverpool player Kevin Baron. Not until 1996 does a second coroner's inquest determine these to be unlawful killings.
- 16 April – Denis Howell, a former Labour sports minister, urges that the FA Cup final should go ahead this season despite consideration by the Football Association for it to be cancelled owing to the Hillsborough disaster.
- 17 April – Home Secretary Douglas Hurd announces plans to make all-seater stadiums compulsory for all Football League First Division clubs to reduce the risk of a repeat of the Hillsborough tragedy.
- 18 April
  - The European Commission accuses Britain of failing to meet standards on drinking water.
  - The Hillsborough disaster claims its 95th victim when 14-year-old Lee Nicol dies in hospital as a result of his injuries. He had been visited in hospital by Diana, Princess of Wales, hours before he died.
  - Tottenham Hotspur remove perimeter fencing from their White Hart Lane stadium as the first step towards avoiding a repeat of the Hillsborough disaster in English football.
- 19 April
  - The Sun newspaper sparks outrage on Merseyside about the Hillsborough Disaster with an article entitled "The Truth", supported by South Yorkshire police and locally based news agencies, which claims that spectators robbed and injured dead spectators, and attacked police officers when they were helping the injured and dying. Other newspapers including the Daily Star and Daily Mirror, as well as several regional newspapers, have also printed similar allegations.
  - Channel Tunnel workers end their 14-day strike.
  - Novelist Dame Daphne du Maurier dies aged 81 at her home in Par, Cornwall.
- 20 April
  - The London Underground is at virtual standstill for a day as most of the workers go on strike in protest against plans for driver-only operated trains.
  - A MORI poll shows Conservative and Labour support equal at 41%.
- 24 April – The BBC's Ceefax teletext is running as only a partial service today owing to a strike by broadcasting unions.
- 27 April – Security Service Act for the first time places MI5 on a statutory basis.
- 28 April
  - John Cannan, of Sutton Coldfield, is sentenced to life imprisonment with a recommendation that he should never be released after being found guilty of murdering one woman and sexually assaulting two others. The prime suspect also in the disappearance of Suzy Lamplugh, he will die in prison in 2024.
  - Fourteen Liverpool fans are convicted of manslaughter and receive prison sentences of up to three years in Brussels, Belgium, in connection with the Heysel disaster at the 1985 European Cup Final in which 39 spectators (most of them Italian) died. A further eleven Liverpool fans are cleared.

=== May ===
- 1–3 May – 54 prisoners stage a three-day protest on the roof of Risley Detention Centre before giving themselves up.
- 4 May – Margaret Thatcher completes ten years as Prime Minister – the first British Prime Minister of the 20th century to do so.
- 5 May – The Vale of Glamorgan constituency in South Wales is seized by the Labour Party in a by-election after 38 years of Conservative control.
- 8 May – More than 3,000 British Rail employees launch an unofficial overtime ban, walking out in protest at the end of their eight-hour shifts.
- 14 May – A public inquiry, headed by Lord Justice Taylor, begins into the Hillsborough disaster.
- 18 May – Unemployment is now below 2,000,000 for the first time since 1980. The Conservative government's joy at tackling unemployment is, however, marred by the findings of a MORI poll which shows Labour slightly ahead of them for the first time in almost three years.
- 19 May – Walshaw Dean Lodge, West Yorkshire, enters the UK Weather Records with the Highest 120-min total rainfall at 193 mm. As of July 2006 this record still stands.
- 20 May – Liverpool win the FA Cup final with a 3–2 victory over their Merseyside rivals Everton. It is the second all-Merseyside cup final in four seasons, and as happened in 1986, Ian Rush is on the scoresheet for Liverpool twice. It is their fourth title in the competition.
- 24 May
  - Sonia Sutcliffe, wife of "Yorkshire Ripper" Peter Sutcliffe, is awarded £600,000 in High Court damages against the satirical magazine Private Eye.
  - A police raid on a suspected drugs operation at a public house in the Heath Town district of Wolverhampton, leads to a riot in which up to 500 people throw missiles and petrol bombs at police officers.
- 26 May – Arsenal F.C. win the First Division league title against Liverpool, with a goal from Michael Thomas in the last minute of the last game of the season. Arsenal have now won nine league titles, ending an 18 year wait to be crowned champions of England. Their win denied Liverpool of a domestic double.
- 30 May – Passport office staff in Liverpool begin an indefinite strike in protest against staffing levels.

=== June ===
- 13 June – The sixteenth James Bond film, Licence to Kill, premieres in London.
- 15 June – By-elections are held in Glasgow Central and Vauxhall, caused by the death of Labour MP Bob McTaggart on 23 March and the resignation of Labour MP Stuart Holland, respectively. Labour holds both seats.
- 19 June – Labour wins 45 of Britain's 78 European Parliament constituencies in the European elections, with the Conservatives gaining 32 seats. The Green Party of England and Wales gains 2,300,000 votes (15% of the vote) but fails to gain a single seat. This is the first national election won by the Labour Party since its last general election win 15 years ago.
- 22 June
  - Police arrest 260 people celebrating the summer solstice at Stonehenge.
  - London Underground workers stage their second one-day strike of the year.
- 24 June – A riot takes place in Dewsbury.

=== July ===
- 1 July – Fears of a property market downturn are heightened when it is reported that many homeowners looking to move are cutting the asking price of their homes by up to 20% in an attempt to speed up the sale of their property, following the property boom of the last 3 years where the price of many homes doubled at the very least.
- 2 July – An IRA bomb kills a British soldier in Hanover, West Germany.
- 10 July – House prices in the south of England have fallen for the second successive quarter, but are continuing to rise in Scotland as well as the north of England.
- 11 July
  - Britain's dock workers go on strike in protest against the abolition of the Dock Labour Scheme.
  - Actor Laurence Olivier, Lord Olivier, dies aged 82 at his home in Ashurst, West Sussex.
- 13 July – The fall in unemployment continues, with the tally now standing at slightly more than 1,800,000 – the lowest in nearly a decade.
- 17 July – 1,500 British tourists are delayed for up to eight hours by French air traffic control strikes.
- 19 July – The BBC programme Panorama accuses Shirley Porter, Conservative Leader of Westminster City Council, of gerrymandering.
- 20 July – Labour's lead in the opinion polls has increased substantially, with the latest MORI poll putting them nine points ahead of the Conservatives on 45%.
- 25 July – The Princess of Wales opens the Landmark Aids Centre, a day centre for people with AIDS, in London.
- 28 July – The industrial action by British Rail drivers is reported to be coming to an end as most of the train drivers have ended their overtime ban.

=== August ===
- 1 August – Charlotte Hughes of Marske-by-the-Sea in Cleveland, believed to be the oldest living person in England, celebrates her 112th birthday.
- 4 August – David Duckenfield, the chief superintendent who took control of the FA Cup semi-final game where the Hillsborough disaster occurred on 15 April this year, is suspended from duty on full pay after an inquiry by Lord Justice Taylor blames him for the tragedy in which 95 people died. Two victims of the tragedy, Andrew Devine (aged 22) and Tony Bland (aged 19) are still unconscious in hospital.
- 5 August – A train derails near West Ealing station in London, but the passengers escape without serious injuries.
- 14 August – The West Midlands Police Serious Crime Squad is disbanded when 50 CID detectives are transferred or suspended after repeated allegations that the force has fabricated confessions.
- 17 August – Introduction of electronic tagging to monitor and supervise crime suspects.
- 18 August – Manchester United chairman Martin Edwards agrees to sell the club to Michael Knighton for £10million.
- 20 August – Marchioness disaster: A pleasure boat is in collision with a dredger on the Thames in London in the early hours; 51 people are killed.
- 26 August – Betteshanger, the last colliery in Kent, closes, signalling the end of the Kent Coalfield after 93 years.
- 29 August – Stone-throwing youths cause mayhem at the Notting Hill Carnival in London, in which many innocent bystanders are injured.
- 30 August – The National Trust's house at Uppark in West Sussex is severely damaged by fire.
- 31 August – Buckingham Palace confirms that The Princess Royal and Captain Mark Phillips are separating after 16 years of marriage.

=== September ===
- 2 September – Economy experts warn that a recession could soon be about to hit the United Kingdom. This would be the second recession in a decade.
- 7 September – Heidi Hazell, the 26-year-old wife of a British soldier, is shot dead in Dortmund, West Germany.
- 8 September – The IRA admits responsibility for the murder of Heidi Hazell. The act is condemned as "evil and cowardly" by British Prime Minister Margaret Thatcher and as "the work of a psychopath" by Opposition Leader Neil Kinnock.
- 12 September – 19,000 ambulance crew members across Britain go on strike.
- 15 September – SLDP leader Paddy Ashdown addresses his party's annual conference in Brighton with a vow to "end Thatcherism" and achieve a long-term aim of getting the SLDP into power.
- 22 September – Eleven people are killed in the Deal barracks bombing.
- 27 September – David Owen, leader of the Social Democratic Party "rump" which rejected a merger with the Social and Liberal Democrats, admits that his party is no longer a national force.
- 29 September – House prices in London have fallen by 3.8% since May, and are now 16% lower than they were at the height of the property boom last year.

=== October ===
- 2 October – Three clergy from the British Council of Protestants cause a disturbance at an Anglican church service in Rome at which the Archbishop of Canterbury Robert Runcie is preaching in protest at his suggestion that the Pope could become the spiritual leader of a united church, while Ian Paisley joins protests outside the service.
- 8 October – The latest CBI findings spark fear of a recession.
- 10 October – The World Wrestling Federation holds its first UK event, at the London Arena.
- 11 October
  - The Rover Group, Britain's largest independent carmaker, launches its new medium-sized hatchback, the second generation 200 Series which replaces the small four-door saloon of the same name and gives buyers a more modern and upmarket alternative to the ongoing Maestro range which has declined in popularity recently.
  - The England national football team qualifies for next Summer's FIFA World Cup in Italy when drawing 0–0 with Poland in Warsaw.
- 12 October – Michael Knighton drops his bid to buy Manchester United.
- 15 October – Recession fears deepen as stock market prices continue to fall dramatically.
- 16 October – The Social and Liberal Democrats, formed last year from the merger of the Social Democratic Party and Liberal Party, are renamed the Liberal Democrats.
- 19 October
  - The Guildford Four are released from prison after the High Court quashes their convictions for the 1975 terrorist atrocity.
  - Labour now has a 10-point lead over the Conservatives in the last MORI poll, with 48% of the vote.
- 21 October – Thousands of people attend a memorial service for Laurence Olivier at Westminster Abbey, during which his ashes are laid to rest in Poets' Corner.
- 23 October – The police force are now taking medical emergency 999 calls in London owing to the ongoing strike by ambulance crews.
- 26 October – Nigel Lawson resigns as Chancellor of the Exchequer, and is replaced by John Major, while Douglas Hurd becomes Foreign Secretary.
- 31 October – British Rail announces that the proposed high-speed rail link to the Channel Tunnel is being postponed for at least one more year.

=== November ===
- 4 November – First showing of the clay animation film A Grand Day Out, introducing the characters Wallace and Gromit, at a film festival in Bristol.
- 7 November – General Assembly of the Church of England votes to allow ordination of women.
- 8 November – British Army and Royal Air Force troops are now manning London's ambulance services as the regular ambulance crews are still on strike.
- 10 November – Margaret Thatcher visits Berlin the day after the fall of the Berlin Wall, which brings the reunification of Germany forward after Germans were allowed to travel between West and East Berlin for the first time since the wall was built in 1961, and between West and East Germany for the first time since the partition of the country after the war.
- 14 November – The Merry Hill Shopping Centre on the Dudley Enterprise Zone in the West Midlands becomes fully operational with the opening of the final shopping mall. The development, which now employs around 6,000 people, first opened to retailers four years ago with several retail warehousing units, and has gradually expanded to become Europe's largest indoor shopping centre. Construction has now begun on the Waterfront office and leisure complex, also within the Enterprise Zone and overlooking the shopping centre, which will open to its first tenants next year. On 7 November, Don and Roy Richardson, the Centre's developers, had announced plans to build the world's tallest building – a 2,000-foot tower including a hotel and nightclub – on land adjacent to the shopping complex; this never takes place.
- 16 November – The Children Act alters the law in regard to children in England and Wales; in particular, it introduces the notion of parental responsibility in access and custody matters.
- 21 November
  - The House of Commons is televised live for the first time.
  - Nigel Martyn, 23, becomes Britain's first £1million goalkeeper when he is transferred from Bristol Rovers to Crystal Palace.
- 23 November – 69-year-old backbencher Sir Anthony Meyer challenges Margaret Thatcher's leadership of the Conservative Party, reportedly fearing that the party will lose the next general election after falling behind Labour in several recent opinion polls. Her leadership has never been challenged before in almost 15 years as party leader, more than 10 of which have been spent as prime minister.
- 30 November – Russell Shankland and Dean Hancock, serving eight-year prison sentences for the manslaughter of taxi driver David Wilkie in South Wales during the miners strike, are released from prison on the fifth anniversary of the crime.

=== December ===
- December
  - The M42 motorway is completed when the final section opens, giving the town of Bromsgrove in Worcestershire (some 10 miles south of Birmingham) a direct link with the M5. Also completed this month is the section of the M40 between Warwick and the interchange with the M42 just south of Solihull. The rest of the M40, between Warwick and Oxford, will open next winter.
  - Last coypu in the wild in Britain is trapped in East Anglia.
  - The Beer Orders restrict the number of tied pubs that can be owned by large brewery groups to two thousand and require large brewer landlords to allow a guest ale to be sourced by tenants from someone other than their landlord.
- 3 December
  - Margaret Thatcher, alongside American president George Bush and Soviet leader Mikhail Gorbachev, declare the end of the Cold War after more than 40 years.
  - 9,000 workers at British carmaker Vauxhall threaten to go on strike.
  - A new-look Band Aid forms for a new version of the Do They Know It's Christmas? charity single for African famine relief.
- 5 December – Margaret Thatcher defeats Anthony Meyer in a leadership election for the Conservative Party, but 60 MPs do not vote for her.
- 6 December – The original run of Doctor Who is ended by the BBC after 26 years.
- 8 December – ITV attracts a new record audience of nearly 27,000,000 for the episode of Coronation Street in which Alan Bradley (Mark Eden) is fatally run over by a Blackpool tram.
- 12 December – Shares in newly privatised regional water industry utility companies (including the largest, Thames Water) achieve premiums of up to 68% in the first day of trading on the Stock Exchange.
- 18 December
  - The Labour Party abandons its policy on closed shops.
  - The second phase of the M40 motorway, linking north Oxfordshire with the Warwickshire/Worcestershire border on the outskirts of the West Midlands conurbation, is opened. The final phase, which links this new motorway with the original London-Oxford section, is due to open within the next year.
- 23 December – Band Aid II gain the Christmas Number One with their charity record. 5 years ago, the original Band Aid single reached number 1 and achieved the highest sales of any single ever released in the UK.
- 24 December – The iconic British Airways Face advert is first aired. Made by advertising firm Saatchi & Saatchi, having been written by Graham Fink and Jeremy Clarke, with Hugh Hudson as director, it is often considered to became a classic television commercial.
- 27 December – SDP leader David Owen predicts another 10 years of Conservative rule, despite Neil Kinnock's Labour Party having a seven-point lead over the Conservatives with 46% of the vote in the final MORI poll of the decade.
- 30 December – 22 people involved in the Lockerbie disaster are among those recognised in the New Year's Honours list, while there are knighthoods for former Liberal leader David Steel and the actress Maggie Smith becomes a Dame. Recipients of sporting honours include the boxer Frank Bruno and the golfer Tony Jacklin, both of whom are credited with MBEs.

=== Undated ===
- Inflation increases significantly this year, standing at 7.8% – the highest for seven years.
- Fears of a recession are deepened by the economy's overall growth rate dropping to 1.7%, the lowest since 1981.
- House prices in London fall to an average of £86,800 this year – a 10% decrease on the 1988 average.
- After spending most of the decade closed down, Whiteleys in London reopens as a shopping centre.
- Remains of The Rose and Globe Theatre discovered in London.
- Permanent gates are installed across Downing Street in London by the end of the year.
- Red kites reintroduced to England and Scotland.
- A record of more than 2.3 million new cars are sold in Britain this year. The Ford Escort is Britain's best selling car for the eighth year running, managing more than 180,000 sales, while the Volkswagen Golf is Britain's most popular foreign car with more than 50,000 sales. Ford achieves the largest sales of any carmaker in Britain for the 15th year in a row, helped by the launch of the third-generation Fiesta in April while Vauxhall has now overtaken the Rover Group as Britain's second best selling carmaker. The UK new car sales record has been broken six times in the last seven years.
- Britain experiences its worst flu epidemic since the winter of 1975–76, with cases peaking in mid-November. More than a million infections are recorded by December, with an increase in flu-related deaths, while hospitals are forced to cancel surgery.

== Publications ==
- Iain Banks' novel Canal Dreams
- Julian Barnes' novel A History of the World in 10½ Chapters
- Julie Burchill's novel Ambition
- William Golding's novel Fire Down Below, third in the To the Ends of the Earth trilogy
- Roger Penrose's book The Emperor's New Mind: Concerning Computers, Minds and The Laws of Physics
- Terry Pratchett's Discworld novels Pyramids and Guards! Guards!; and The Bromeliad novel Truckers
- Rose Tremain's novel Restoration

== Births ==
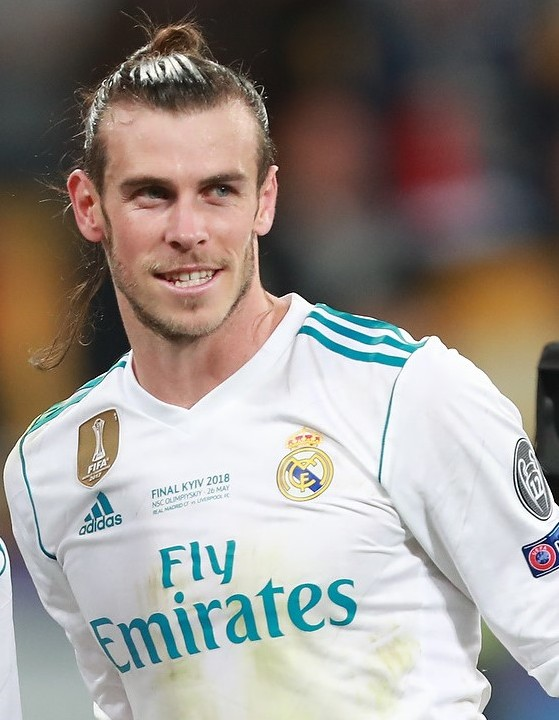
Gareth Bale

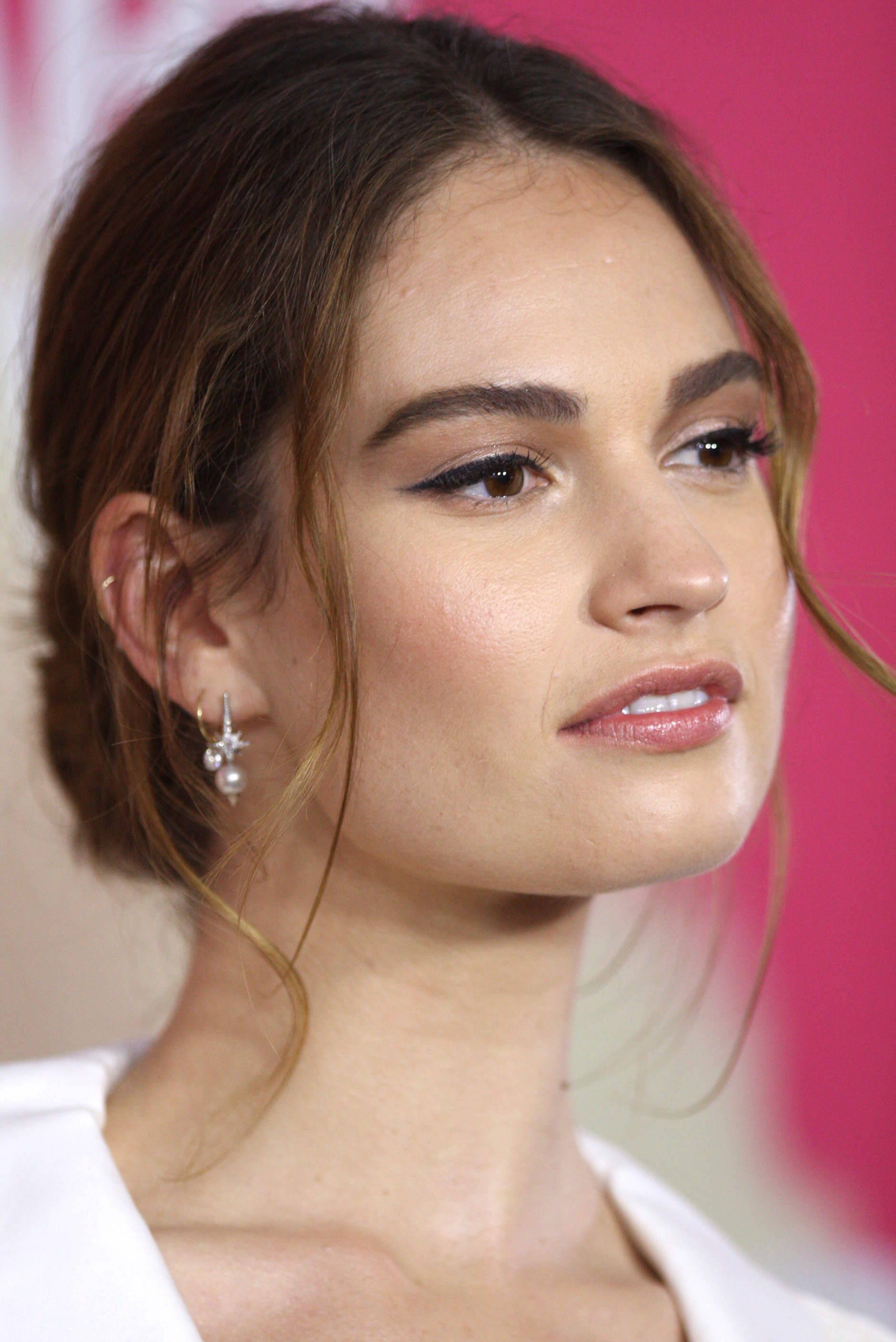
Lily James

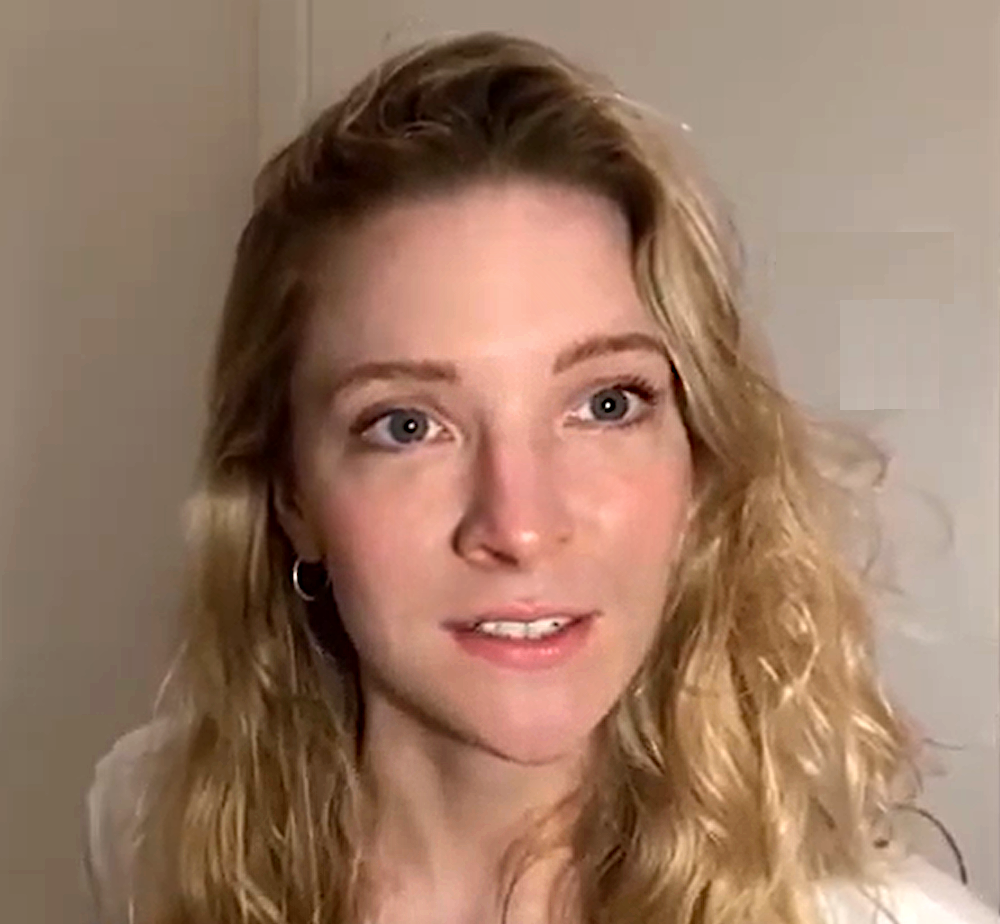
Morfydd Clark

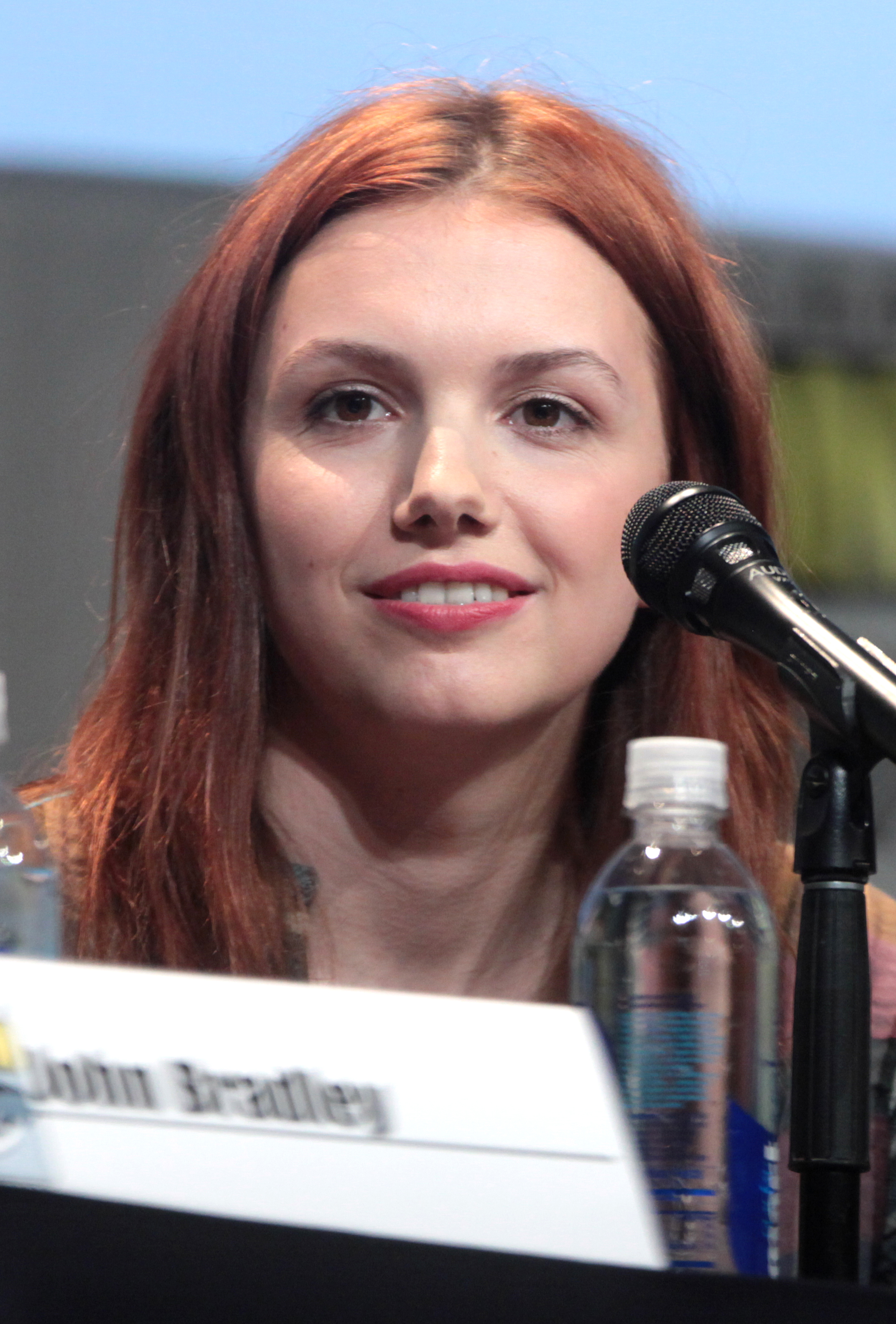
Hannah Murray

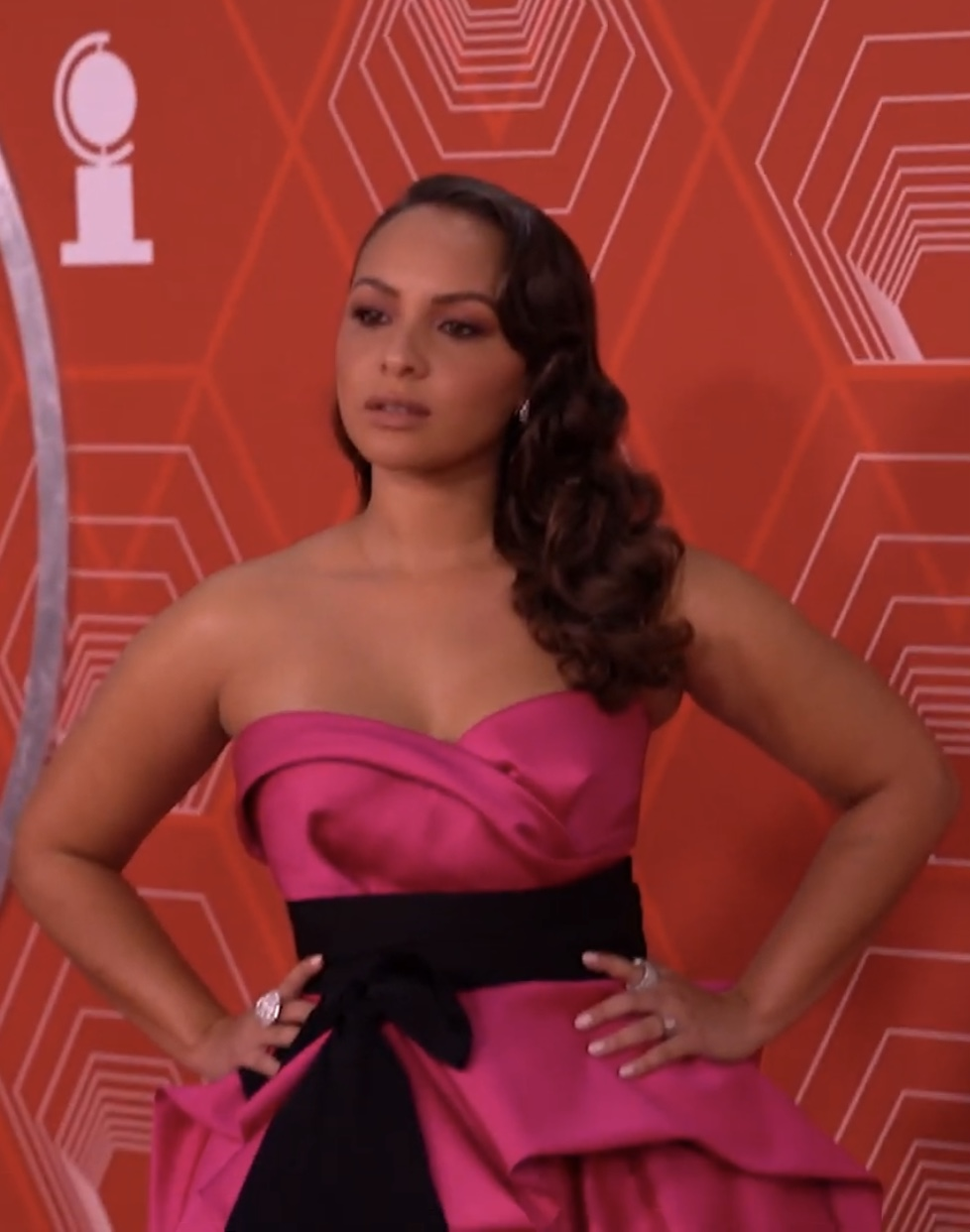
Jasmine Cephas Jones

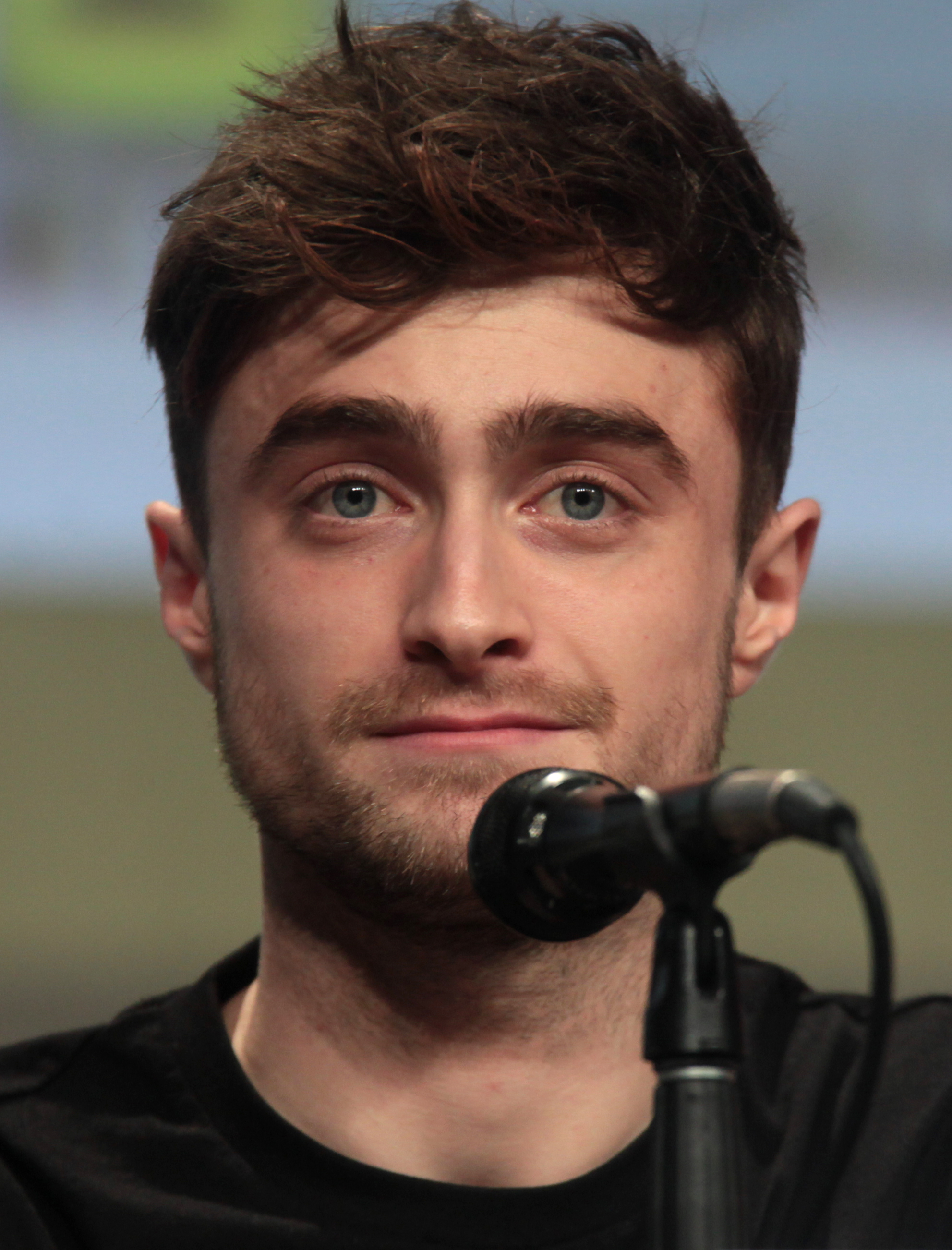
Daniel Radcliffe

- 1 January – Zoe Boyle, actress
- 3 January
  - Alex Hales, cricketer
  - Anthony Wordsworth, footballer
- 6 January – Andy Carroll, English footballer
- 9 January – Jordan Turner, English rugby league player
- 11 January – Chris Perry-Metcalf, actor
- 13 January – Matt Stokoe, English actor
- 17 January – Hollie-Jay Bowes, actress
- 21 January – Katie Griffiths, actress
- 23 January – April Pearson, actress
- 26 January
  - Hannah Arterton, actress
  - Imogen Cairns, gymnast
- 27 January – Daisy Lowe, fashion model
- 28 January – Carly Paoli, mezzo-soprano
- 7 February – Louisa Lytton, English actress and dancer
- 8 February – Dani Harmer, actress
- 17 February – Rebecca Adlington, Olympic gold medal-winning swimmer
- 24 February – Daniel Kaluuya, actor and screenwriter
- 27 February
  - Lloyd Rigby, footballer
  - Sam Sweeney, folk musician
- 2 March
  - Nathalie Emmanuel, actress
  - Chris Woakes, cricketer
- 13 March
  - Peaches Geldof, performer (d. 2014)
  - Harry Melling, English actor
- 16 March – Theo Walcott, footballer
- 17 March – Morfydd Clark, actress
- 18 March – Lily Collins, actress
- 21 March – Rochelle Humes, singer and TV presenter
- 25 March – Scott Sinclair, English footballer
- 26 March – Sam Pepper, internet personality
- 28 March – David Goodwillie, Scottish footballer
- 1 April – Royce Pierreson, actor
- 5 April – Lily James, English actress
- 8 April – Matty Healy, singer-songwriter
- 19 April – Sam Tordoff, racing driver
- 22 April
  - Catherine Banner, author
  - Thomas James Longley, actor
  - James McClean, Northern Irish footballer
- 4 May – Rory McIlroy, golfer
- 5 May – Larissa Wilson, actress
- 9 May – Ellen White, footballer
- 21 May – Kate Phillips, actress
- 31 May – Sean Thornley, tennis player
- 3 June – Imogen Poots, actress
- 8 June – Richard Fleeshman, actor
- 12 June
  - Jade Anouka, actress
  - Dale Stephens, footballer
- 23 June – Lauren Bennett, singer, dancer, painter, photographer and model (died 2026)
- 25 June – Sam Ryder, singer-songwriter
- 26 June – Magid Magid, Somali-born British politician and activist
- 27 June
  - Matthew Lewis, actor
  - Cameron Menzies, darts player
- 1 July
  - Mitch Hewer, actor
  - Hannah Murray, actress
- 2 July – Tom Zanetti, DJ and rapper
- 11 July – Aden Flint, footballer
- 16 July – Gareth Bale, Welsh footballer
- 21 July
  - Jasmine Cephas Jones
  - Juno Temple, actress
  - Jamie Waylett, actor
- 23 July – Daniel Radcliffe, actor (Harry Potter films)
- 9 August – Lucy Dixon, English actress
- 20 August – Judd Trump, snooker player
- 21 August – Rob Knox, English actor (died 2008)
- 29 August – Charlotte Ritchie, actress and singer
- 1 September – Daniel Sturridge, footballer
- 7 September
  - Holly Colvin, cricketer
  - Hugh Mitchell, actor
- 10 September – Matt Ritchie, Scottish footballer
- 14 September – Jessica Brown Findlay, actress
- 18 September – Chris Eubank Jr, boxer
- 21 September – Ben Mee, footballer
- 22 September – Michael Heaver, English politician, MEP
- 25 September – Vick Hope, television and radio presenter
- 26 September
  - Emma Rigby, actress
  - Kieran Gibbs, English footballer
  - Jonny Bairstow, English cricketer
- 15 October – Anthony Joshua, boxer
- 20 October – Jess Glynne, pop singer-songwriter
- 30 October – Ashley Barnes, footballer
- 3 November
  - Elliott Tittensor, actor
  - Luke Tittensor, actor
- 5 November – Andrew Boyce, English footballer
- 9 November
  - Jennifer Pike, violinist
  - Murugan Thiruchelvam, chess player
- 10 November – Taron Egerton, Welsh actor, born in England
- 15 November – Joe Westerman, rugby league player
- 18 November – Marc Albrighton, English footballer
- 21 November – Fabian Delph, English footballer
- 26 November – Junior Stanislas, footballer
- 27 November – Freddie Sears, footballer
- 28 November
  - Claire Brookin, darts player
  - Ayesha Gwilt, actress
  - Martin Hare, handball player
- 7 December – Nicholas Hoult, actor
- 12 December – Harry Eden, actor
- 15 December – Lady Leshurr, rapper, singer and producer
- 18 December – Emily Atack, actress
- 28 December – Harry Arter, footballer
- Unknown date – Roshonara Choudhry, Islamic terrorist convicted of the attempted murder of MP Stephen Timms

== Deaths ==
=== January ===
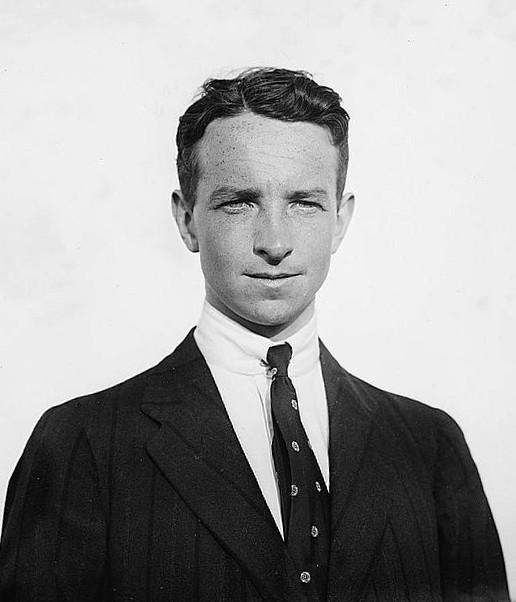
Thomas Sopwith

- 1 January – Joseph Petre, 17th Baron Petre, peer (born 1914)
- 3 January – Errol Le Cain, artist (born 1941, Singapore)
- 6 January – Rhoda Sutherland, linguist (born 1906)
- 7 January – Frank Adams, mathematician (born 1930)
- 10 January – Beatrice Lillie, actress, singer and comedic performer (born 1894)
- 11 January
  - George Abell, civil servant (born 1904)
  - Peter Nichols, journalist (born 1928)
  - Sir Geoffrey Tuttle, RAF air marshal (born 1906)
- 14 January – Richard Warner, actor (born 1911)
- 15 January – Wendy Foster, architect (born 1937)
- 16 January – Joseph Henry Lynch, artist (born 1911)
- 18 January – Bruce Chatwin, novelist and travel writer (born 1940)
- 19 January – Norma Varden, actress (born 1898)
- 20 January – John Harding, 1st Baron Harding of Petherton, Army general (born 1896)
- 21 January – Chris Greenham, film sound engineer (born 1923)
- 23 January
  - John Lyon-Dalberg-Acton, 3rd Baron Acton, peer and soldier (born 1907)
  - Michael Layton, 2nd Baron Layton, peer (born 1912)
  - Angus Morrison, pianist (born 1902)
- 27 January
  - Arthur Marshall, writer and broadcaster (born 1910)
  - Sir Thomas Sopwith, aviation pioneer and yachtsman (born 1888)
- 31 January – Audrey Beecham, poet, teacher and historian (born 1915)

=== February ===
- 1 February – Sir James Drake, civil engineer (born 1907)
- 3 February – Sir John Davis, RAF air marshal (born 1911)
- 11 February
  - T. E. B. Clarke, screenwriter (born 1907)
  - Margery Hurst, businesswoman (born 1913)
- 12 February – Pat Finucane, Northern Irish lawyer (murdered by the Provisional IRA) (born 1949)
- 14 February – Vincent Crane, musician (born 1944)
- 17 February – Ian Fraser, Baron Fraser of Tullybelton, judge (born 1911)
- 18 February
  - John Bailey, actor (born 1912)
  - Dixie Deans, RAF pilot (born 1914)
  - Ann Davidson Kelly, social worker (born 1912)
- 21 February – Denys Corley Smith, author and journalist (born 1922)
- 22 February – Sir Raymond Gower, Conservative Party MP (born 1916)
- 25 February – Richard Sidney Sayers, economist and historian (born 1908)
- 26 February – Joseph Fenton, Northern Irish estate agent (murdered by the Provisional IRA) (born c. 1953)
- 28 February – Sir Douglas Kendrew, Army major-general and rugby player (born 1910)

=== March ===
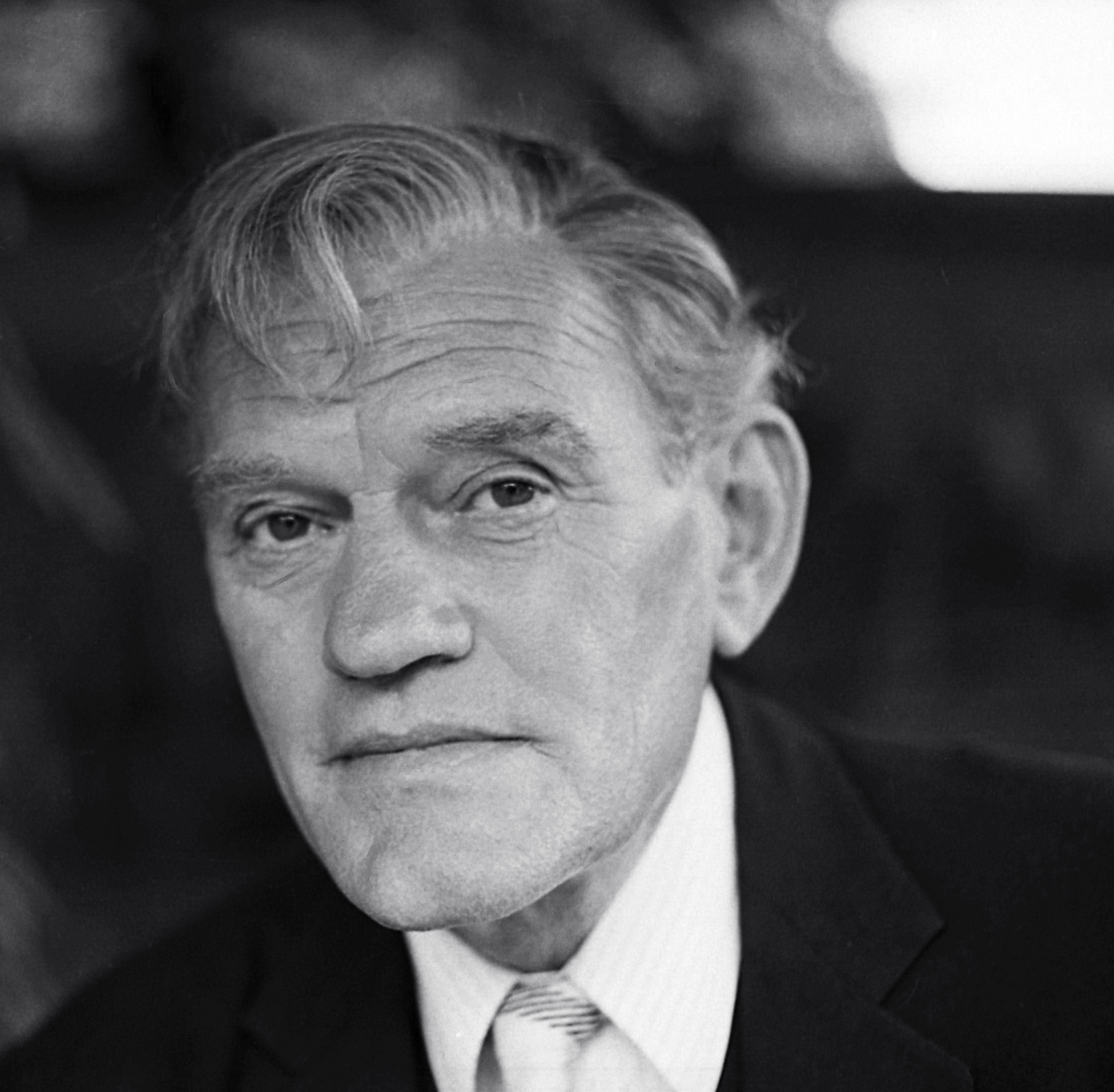
Harry Andrews

- 5 March – Alice Garnett, geographer (born 1903)
- 6 March – Harry Andrews, actor (born 1911)
- 12 March – Maurice Evans, actor (born 1901)
- 13 March – L. E. Baynes, aeronautical engineer (born 1902)
- 15 March – Henry Cass, film director (born 1903)
- 16 March
  - Alan Redpath, clergyman and author (born 1907)
  - Marcus Morris, publisher and Anglican priest (born 1915)
- 18 March – Sir Harold Jeffreys, mathematician (born 1891)
- 19 March – Charles Lamb, actor (born 1900)
- 22 March
  - Margaret Kidd, lawyer and politician (born 1900)
  - Peta Taylor, cricketer (born 1912)
- 23 March – Bob McTaggart, Labour Party MP (born 1945)
- 24 March – Sir Edmund Stockdale, banker (born 1903)

=== April ===
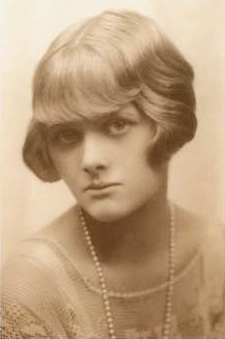
Daphne du Maurier

- 1 April
  - Richard Austin, orchestral conductor (born 1903)
  - George Robledo, Chilean-born footballer based in Britain (born 1926)
- 4 April
  - Keith Andrews, art historian (born 1920)
  - John Gretton, 3rd Baron Gretton, peer (born 1941)
  - John W. Todd, physician (born 1912)
- 5 April – Geoffrey Binnie, civil engineer (born 1908)
- 10 April – Joan Barry, actress (born 1903; died in Spain)
- 11 April – Sir Alexander Giles, colonial administrator (born 1915)
- 12 April – Gerald Flood, actor (born 1927)
- 15 April – William Samuel Fyffe, Northern Irish politician (born 1914)
- 19 April – Dame Daphne du Maurier, novelist (born 1907)
- 20 April – Lydia Sherwood, actress (born 1906)
- 22 April – Paul Beard, violinist (born 1901)
- 25 April
  - George Coulouris, actor (born 1903)
  - Alan Robertson, geneticist (born 1920)
- 28 April – Stanley Roy Badmin, artist (born 1906)
- 29 April – Leonard Redshaw, shipbuilder (born 1911)

=== May ===
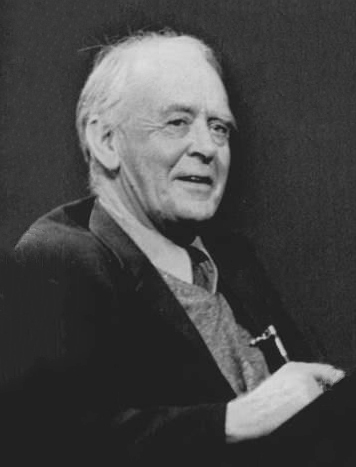
John Hicks

- 3 May – Roland Robinson, 1st Baron Martonmere, Conservative politician and Governor of Bermuda (1964–1972) (born 1907)
- 8 May – Mariga Guinness, architectural conservationist (born 1932)
- 10 May – Stewart Perowne, diplomat and archaeologist (born 1901)
- 17 May – Jeffrey Thomas, Labour politician (born 1933)
- 18 May
  - Geoffrey Gilbert, flautist (born 1914)
  - Felicity Shaw, writer (born 1916)
- 19 May – C. L. R. James, writer and journalist (born 1901)
- 20 May – John Hicks, economist, Nobel Prize laureate (born 1904)
- 22 May – George Ian Scott, Scottish ophthalmic surgeon (born 1907)
- 24 May – George Lambert, 2nd Viscount Lambert, politician (born 1909)
- 26 May – Don Revie, footballer, manager of Leeds United and the England national football team (born 1927)
- 27 May – Ronald Gibson, physician (born 1909)
- 29 May – Nora Barlow, Lady Barlow, botanist and geneticist (born 1885)
- 30 May – James Harry Lacey, World War II air ace and Battle of Britain veteran (born 1917)

=== June ===
- 4 June – Cecil Collins, artist (born 1908)
- 6 June – Richard Kahn, Baron Kahn, economist (born 1905)
- 7 June – Steve Henshaw, motorcycle racer (killed while racing) (born 1954)
- 9 June – James Lawrence Isherwood, artist (born 1917)
- 11 June – Ronald Eric Bishop, aircraft engineer and designer (de Havilland Mosquito, de Havilland Comet) (born 1903)
- 14 June
  - Pete de Freitas, rock musician, drummer with band Echo and the Bunnymen (born 1961)
  - William Stephenson, psychologist (born 1902)
- 15 June
  - Geoffrey Alexander, actor (born 1921)
  - Richard Byron, 12th Baron Byron, peer and Army officer (born 1899)
- 16 June – John Westbrook, actor (born 1922)
- 25 June – Idris Cox, Welsh communist activist and journalist (born 1899)
- 27 June
  - Sir Alfred Ayer, philosopher (born 1910)
  - Samuel Newby Curle, mathematician (born 1930)

=== July ===
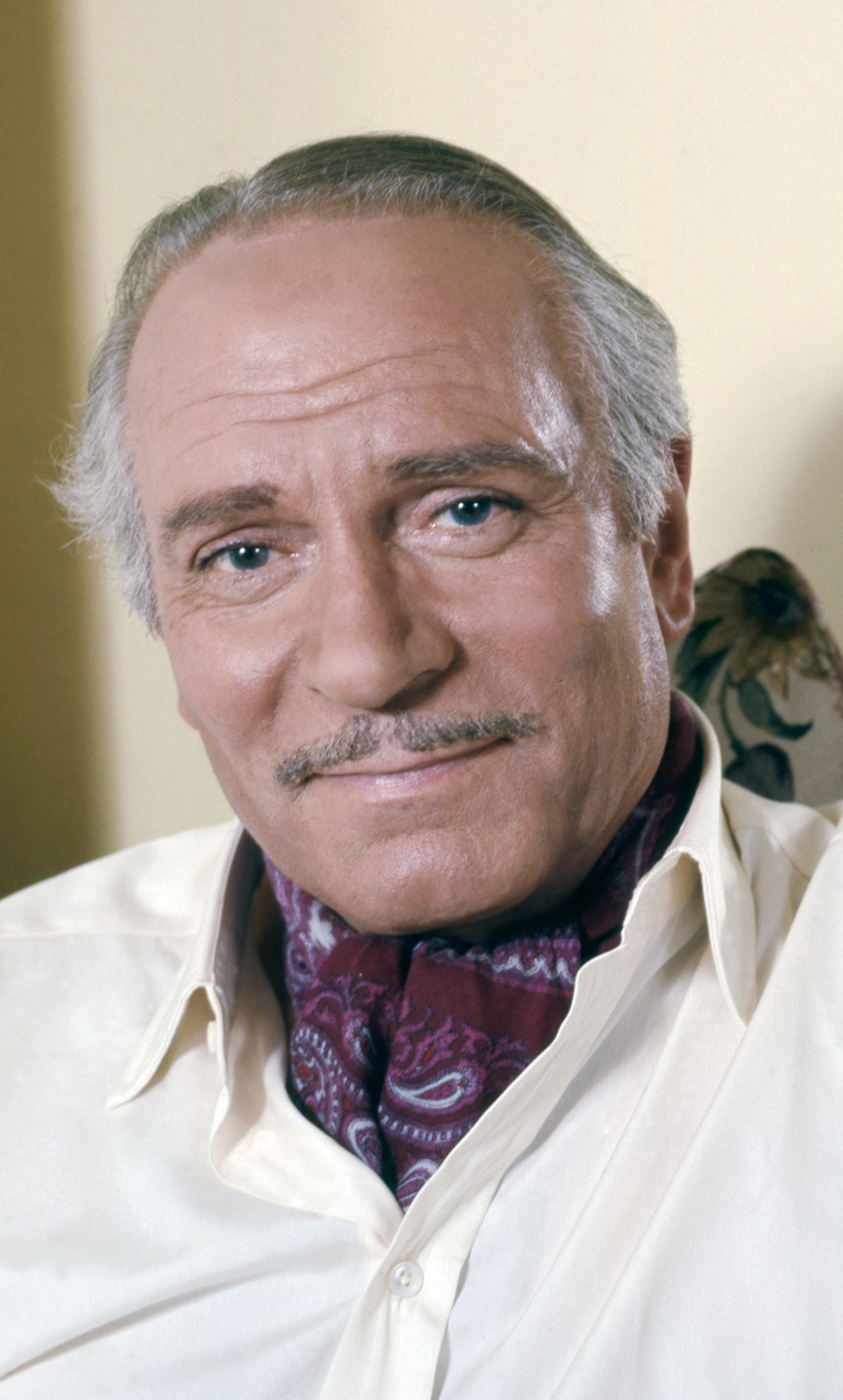
Laurence Olivier

- 1 July
  - Joan Cooper, actress and wife of Arthur Lowe (born 1922)
  - Dora Gaitskell, widow of Labour Party leader Hugh Gaitskell (born 1901)
- 2 July – Ben Wright, actor (born 1915)
- 4 July – Jack Haig, actor (born 1913)
- 5 July – Berthold Wolpe, German-born calligrapher, typographer and illustrator (born 1905)
- 10 July – Tommy Trinder, comedian and actor (born 1909)
- 11 July – Laurence Olivier (Lord Olivier), actor, director and producer (born 1907)
- 14 July – Frank Bell, linguist and academic (born 1916)
- 15 July
  - Laurie Cunningham, English footballer based in Spain (born 1956)
  - Leonard Harrison, RAF officer (born 1905)
  - Dennis Wilson, composer (born 1920)
- 16 July – Sir Brynmor Jones, academic (born 1903)
- 19 July
  - J. M. Cohen, translator (born 1903)
  - Colin Crowe, diplomat (born 1913)
- 23 July
  - Charles Edward Foister, botanist (born 1903)
  - Henry Raynor, musicologist (born 1917)
  - Michael Sundin, Blue Peter presenter (born 1961)
- 28 July – B. V. Bowden, Baron Bowden, scientist (born 1910)
- 31 July – Francis Lane Fox, Army lieutenant-colonel (born 1899)

=== August ===
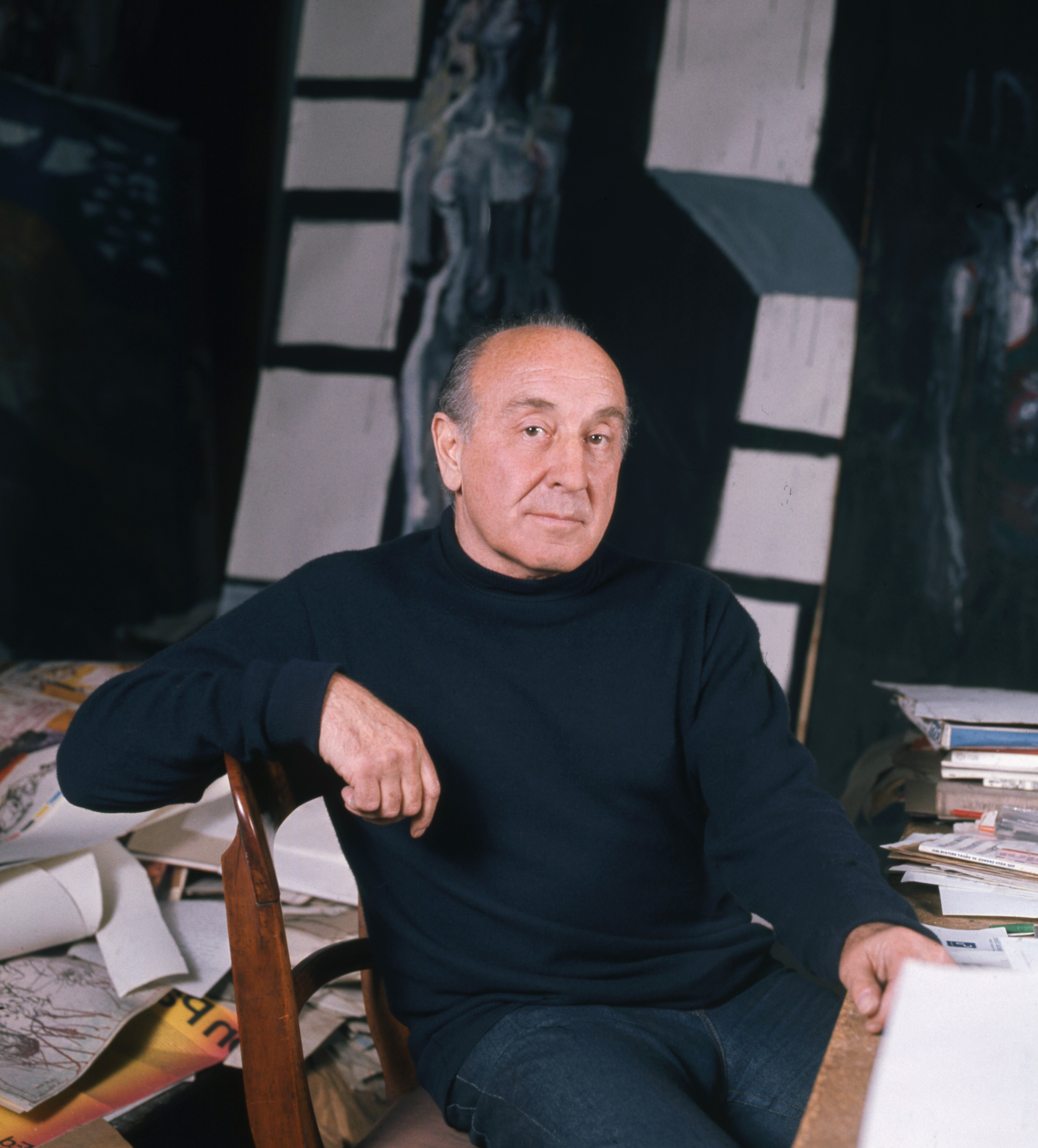
Feliks Topolski

- 1 August – John Ogdon, pianist (born 1937)
- 2 August – Euphemia Cunningham, munitions worker in World War I (born 1892)
- 4 August
  - Maurice Colbourne , actor (born 1939)
  - Geoffrey Cross, Baron Cross of Chelsea, judge (born 1904)
- 8 August
  - Brian Naylor, racing driver (born 1923)
  - Audrey Russell, journalist (born 1906)
- 10 August – Isabella Forshall, pediatric surgeon (born 1900)
- 15 August – William Sydney Atkins, engineer and entrepreneur (born 1902)
- 17 August – Harry Corbett, magician, puppeteer and television presenter, creator of Sooty (born 1918)
- 22 August – Charles Hill, Baron Hill of Luton, physician and politician (born 1904)
- 23 August – R. D. Laing, psychiatrist (born 1927)
- 24 August
  - Marjorie Pratt, Countess of Brecknock, courtier and socialite (born 1900)
  - Feliks Topolski, artist (born 1906, Russian Empire)
- 29 August – Peter Scott, ornithologist, conservationist and painter, son of Captain Robert Falcon Scott (born 1909)

=== September ===
- 2 September – Clifton Parker, composer (born 1905)
- 4 September – William Taylor, ophthalmologist (born 1912)
- 5 September
  - Philip Baxter, chemical engineer (born 1905)
  - William Mann, music critic (born 1924, India)
- 8 September – Ann George, actress (born 1903)
- 10 September – James Shaw, Baron Kilbrandon, judge (born 1906)
- 13 September
  - Kathleen Bliss, theologian (born 1908)
  - Jenny Hyslop, community leader (born 1898)
- 14 September – Raymond Codling, police inspector (murdered) (born 1939)
- 17 September – Sir Richard Hull, Army field marshal (born 1907)
- 18 September – Alexander Fletcher, Conservative politician (born 1929)
- 19 September
  - Vera Barclay, author and Scouting pioneer (born 1893)
  - Philip Sayer, actor (born 1946)
- 25 September – Nowell Myres, archaeologist (born 1902)
- 27 September – Dorothea Ramsey, social worker (born 1904)
- 28 September – Francis Ronald Swain, RAF air commodore (born 1903)

=== October ===
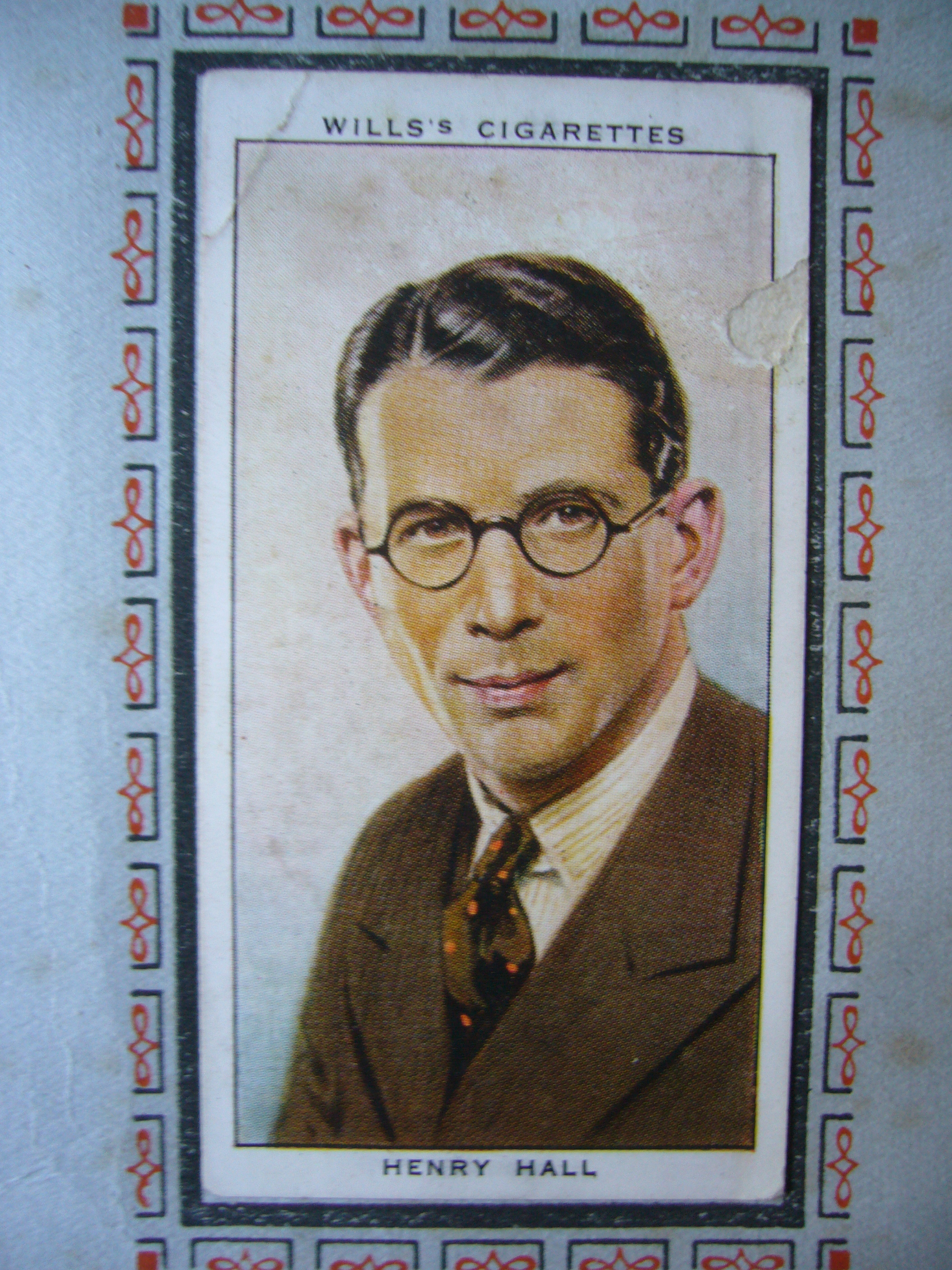
Henry Hall

- 1 October
  - Eric Ball, composer (born 1903)
  - David Lindesay-Bethune, 15th Earl of Lindsay, peer and soldier (born 1926)
- 4 October – Graham Chapman, comedian (born 1941)
- 7 October – George Green, trade union leader (born 1908)
- 8 October – Anne Dawson, World War I spy (born 1896)
- 17 October – R. A. B. Mynors, classicist and mediaevalist (born 1903; road accident)
- 19 October – Albert Geldard, footballer (Everton) (born 1914)
- 20 October – Sir Anthony Quayle, actor (born 1913)
- 22 October – Ewan MacColl, singer-songwriter and activist (born 1915)
- 27 October – Allan Campbell McLean, writer and political activist (born 1922)
- 28 October – Henry Hall, bandleader (born 1898)
- 31 October – Roger Scott, radio presenter (born 1943)

=== November ===
- 1 November
  - Peter Childs, actor (born 1939)
  - Leslie Runciman, 2nd Viscount Runciman of Doxford, peer (born 1900)
- 2 November – Frederick Gordon-Lennox, 9th Duke of Richmond, peer (born 1904)
- 7 November – Alec Mango, actor (born 1911)
- 8 November – Olive Henry, artist (born 1902)
- 11 November – Nicholas Freeman, Conservative politician (born 1939)
- 13 November
  - Stewart Chalmers, footballer (born 1907)
  - Arthur Hutchings, composer and musicologist (born 1906)
- 14 November – Jimmy Murphy, footballer and coach (born 1910)
- 15 November – Jeremy Flint, contract bridge writer (born 1928)
- 16 November – Oliver Smedley, businessman and activist (born 1911)
- 17 November – David Blundy, journalist (born 1945; murdered in Ecuador)
- 21 November
  - Edward Bawden, artist (born 1903)
  - Peter Burton, actor (born 1921)
- 22 November – Billy Milton, actor (born 1905)
- 25 November – William Stratton, Army lieutenant-general (born 1903)
- 26 November – Morrice James, Baron Saint Brides, diplomat (born 1916)
- 29 November – Gubby Allen, Australian-born England cricketer and cricket administrator (born 1902)

=== December ===
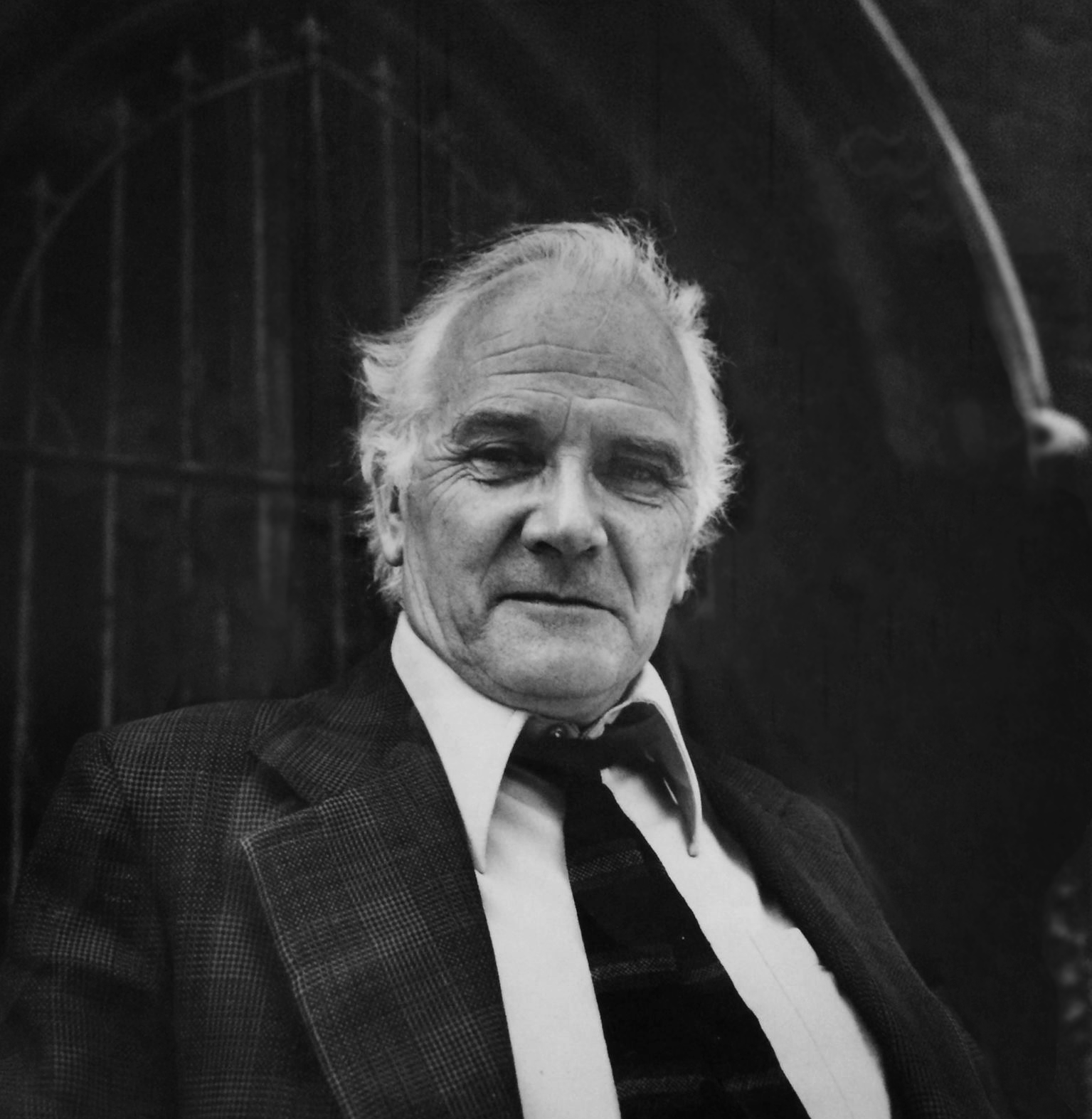
Paul Jennings

- 2 December – William Taylour, archaeologist (born 1904)
- 4 December
  - Elwyn Jones, Baron Elwyn-Jones, Labour politician (born 1909)
  - Kathleen Manners, Duchess of Rutland, aristocrat (born 1894)
- 5 December – Sir John Pritchard, conductor (born 1918)
- 6 December – Joyce Howard Barrell, composer (born 1917)
- 7 December – Sirima (Sirima Nicole Waratunga), singer (born 1964; murdered)
- 10 December – Sam Barkas, footballer (born 1910)
- 11 December – Howard Lang, actor (born 1911)
- 13 December – Roderick Mackenzie, 4th Earl of Cromartie, Scottish peer and soldier (born 1904)
- 15 December – Edward Underdown, actor (born 1908)
- 16 December – Marjorie Westbury, actress (born 1905)
- 17 December
  - Edward Boyd, scriptwriter (born 1916)
  - J. Alastair Montgomerie, businessman (born 1914)
  - Sir Charles Norris, Royal Navy vice-admiral (born 1900)
- 19 December – Stella Gibbons, novelist, journalist, poet and short-story writer (born 1902)
- 21 December
  - Sir Hugh Elliott, 3rd Baronet, ornithologist and conservationist (born 1913)
  - Elsie Griffin, opera singer (born 1895)
- 23 December
  - Peter Bennett, actor (born 1917)
  - John Cavendish, 5th Baron Chesham, politician (born 1916)
- 24 December – Charles Moore, 11th Earl of Drogheda, peer (born 1910)
- 26 December
  - Sir Lennox Berkeley, composer (born 1903)
  - Walter Bromley-Davenport, Conservative politician (born 1903)
  - Sybil Cholmondeley, Marchioness of Cholmondeley, aristocrat (born 1894)
  - Denis Garrett, mycologist and plant pathologist (born 1906)
  - Paul Jennings, author and humorist (born 1918)
  - Peggy Thorpe-Bates, actress (born 1914)
- 27 December
  - John Monteath Robertson, Scottish chemist (born 1900)
  - Edmund Warwick, actor (born 1907)
- 28 December – William Scott, Ulster Scots painter (born 1913)
- 30 December – Madoline Thomas, actress (born 1890)
- 31 December – Margaret Gordon, illustrator (born 1939)

== See also ==
- 1989 in British music
- 1989 in British television
- List of British films of 1989
