= 1980s in medicine =

This is a list of events associated with medicine in the 1980s.

== 1980 ==
=== October ===
- 10: The Nobel Prize in Physiology or Medicine is jointly awarded to Baruj Benacerraf, Jean Dausset and George D. Snell "for their discoveries concerning genetically determined structures on the cell surface that regulate immunological reactions".

== 1981 ==
=== October ===
- 09: The Nobel Prize in Physiology or Medicine is jointly awarded to Roger W. Sperry "for his discoveries concerning the functional specialization of the cerebral hemispheres" as well as David H. Hubel and Torsten N. Wiesel "for their discoveries concerning information processing in the visual system".

== 1982 ==
=== October ===
- 11: The Nobel Prize in Physiology or Medicine is jointly awarded to Sune K. Bergström, Bengt I. Samuelsson and John R. Vane "for their discoveries concerning prostaglandins and related biologically active substances".

== 1983 ==
- 1983 West Bank fainting epidemic
- The Nobel Prize in Physiology or Medicine is awarded to Barbara McClintock "for her discovery of mobile genetic elements".

== 1984 ==
- The Nobel Prize in Physiology or Medicine is jointly awarded to Niels K. Jerne, Georges J. F. Köhler and César Milstein "for theories concerning the specificity in development and control of the immune system and the discovery of the principle for production of monoclonal antibodies.

=== February ===
- 01: Australia introduces the Medicare program, a universal healthcare program.

== 1985 ==
- The Nobel Prize in Physiology or Medicine is jointly awarded to Michael S. Brown and Joseph L. Goldstein "for their discoveries concerning the regulation of cholesterol metabolism".

== 1986 ==
- The Nobel Prize in Physiology or Medicine is jointly awarded to Stanley Cohen and Rita Levi-Montalcini "for their discoveries of growth factors".

== 1987 ==
- 1987 Carroll County cryptosporidiosis outbreak
- The Nobel Prize in Physiology or Medicine is awarded to Susumu Tonegawa "for his discovery of the genetic principle for generation of antibody diversity".

== 1988 ==
- The Nobel Prize in Physiology or Medicine is jointly awarded to James W. Black, Gertrude B. Elion and George H. Hitchings "for their discoveries of important principles for drug treatment".

== 1989 ==
- 1989–1990 flu epidemic in the United Kingdom
- The Nobel Prize in Physiology or Medicine is jointly awarded to J. Michael Bishop and Harold E. Varmus "for their discovery of the cellular origin of retroviral oncogenes".

== See also ==
- 1980s in science and technology
- 1970s in medicine
- 1990s in medicine
- Timeline of medicine and medical technology
