= 1970s in medicine =

This is a list of events associated with medicine in the 1970s.

== 1970 ==
=== October ===
- The Nobel Prize in Physiology or Medicine is jointly awarded to Bernard Katz, Ulf von Euler and Julius Axelrod "for their discoveries concerning the humoral transmitters in the nerve terminals and the mechanisms for their storage, release and inactivation".

== 1971 ==
- Maurice Hilleman develops the MMR vaccine, combining existing vaccines for measles, mumps and rubella into one.

=== October ===
- The Nobel Prize in Physiology or Medicine is awarded to Earl W. Sutherland Jr. "for his discoveries concerning the mechanisms of the action of hormones".

== 1972 ==
- 1972 Yugoslav smallpox outbreak
- London flu

=== October ===
- The Nobel Prize in Physiology or Medicine is jointly awarded to Gerald Maurice Edelman and Rodney Robert Porter "for their discoveries concerning the chemical structure of antibodies".

== 1973 ==
- The Nobel Prize in Physiology or Medicine is jointly awarded to Karl von Frisch, Konrad Lorenz and Nikolaas Tinbergen "for their discoveries concerning organization and elicitation of individual and social behaviour patterns".

== 1974 ==
- 1974 smallpox epidemic in India

=== October ===
- The Nobel Prize in Physiology or Medicine is jointly awarded to Albert Claude, Christian de Duve and George E. Palade "for their discoveries concerning the structural and functional organization of the cell".

== 1975 ==
- Japan Air Lines food poisoning incident

=== October ===
- The Nobel Prize in Physiology or Medicine is jointly awarded to David Baltimore, Renato Dulbecco and Howard Temin "for their discoveries concerning the interaction between tumour viruses and the genetic material of the cell".

== 1976 ==
- 1976 swine flu outbreak
- 1976 Philadelphia Legionnaires' disease outbreak
- 1976 Zaire Ebola virus outbreak

=== October ===
- 14: The Nobel Prize in Physiology or Medicine is jointly awarded to Baruch Samuel Blumberg and D. Carleton Gajdusek "for their discoveries concerning new mechanisms for the origin and dissemination of infectious diseases".

== 1977 ==
- 1977 Russian flu

=== October ===
- The Nobel Prize in Physiology or Medicine is divided in half between Roger Guillemin and Andrew Schally "for their discoveries concerning the peptide hormone production of the brain" with the other half going to Rosalyn Yalow "for the development of radioimmunoassays of peptid hormones."

== 1978 ==
- 1978 smallpox outbreak in the United Kingdom

=== September ===
- 11: Janet Parker, the last confirmed victim of smallpox, dies. She was a British medical photographer who worked at the anatomy department at Birmingham Medical School where she was accidentally exposed to smallpox from a research lab.

=== October ===
- The Nobel Prize in Physiology or Medicine is jointly awarded to Werner Arber, Daniel Nathans and Hamilton O. Smith "for the discovery of restriction enzymes and their application to problems of molecular genetics".

== 1979 ==
- Sverdlovsk anthrax leak
- Leukotrienes are identified and named by Bengt I. Samuelsson.

=== October ===
- 11: The Nobel Prize in Physiology or Medicine is jointly awarded to Allan M. Cormack and Godfrey Hounsfield "for the development of computer assisted tomography".

== See also ==
- 1980s in medicine
- Timeline of medicine and medical technology
