= Mahendra Dutta =

Indian public health official (1931–2020)

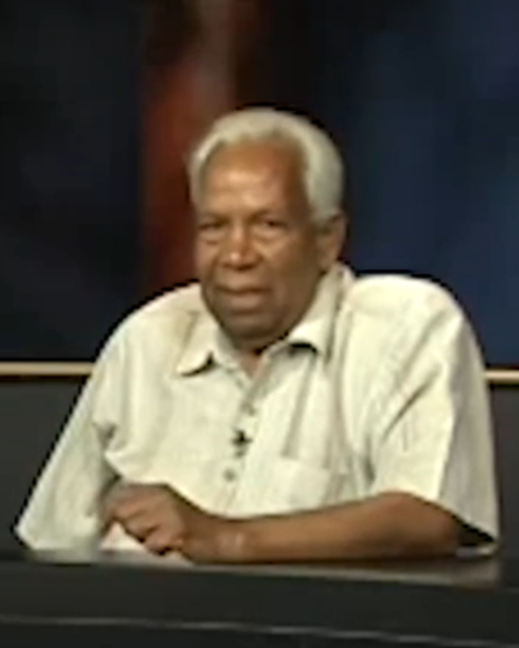

30th President of the Indian Public Health Association
- In office 1 January 1987 – 31 December 1987

Personal details
- Born: May 26, 1931 Faridabad, Haryana, India
- Died: February 17, 2020 (aged 88) Faridabad, Haryana, India
- Children: 3
- Education: Forman Christian College (BS); Government Medical College, Amritsar (MBBS); All India Institute of Hygiene and Public Health (Diploma in Public Health)

Mahendra Dutta (26 May 1931 – 17 February 2020) was an Indian public health official, best known for his efforts to eradicate smallpox in India as the appraisal officer for smallpox in Bihar during the 1974 epidemic. He later served as Health Commissioner of New Delhi, Chief Epidemiologist of the National Centre for Disease Control, and Deputy Director General of the Ministry of Health and Family Welfare's public health operations. Additionally, he was a founding member of the Indian Public Health Association, serving as its president in 1987. Dutta's career is featured in an episode of Céline Gounder's 2023 podcast series Epidemic: Eradicating Smallpox.

== Early life and education ==
Mahendra Dutta was born on 26 May 1931 in Faridabad, Haryana. His undergraduate studies at Forman Christian College in Lahore (now in Pakistan) were transitioned to Shimla, Himachal Pradesh due to the 1947 partition of India. Inspired by his father's work as a Rockefeller Foundation fellow practicing as a public health physician, Dutta pursued a Diploma in Public Health at the All India Institute of Hygiene and Public Health in Kolkata.

== Public health career ==
In 1981, Mahendra Dutta published a retrospective of India's National Smallpox Eradication Programme (NSEP), which from its 1962 founding to 1966, vaccinated nearly the entire population of India. Despite these efforts, smallpox outbreaks continued, prompting Dutta to advocate for a search and containment approach, in which cases are identified through community outreach to focus on ring vaccination of those most likely to be infected. Following the World Health Organization's December 1979 announcement of global smallpox eradication, Dutta argued for ending smallpox vaccinations, given that other animal species do not serve as a reservoir of the variola virus.

In July 2008, Dutta met with William Foege, a former director of the US Centers for Disease Control and Prevention (CDC) who had previously worked with him on smallpox eradication efforts, as part of the CDC's Histories of Smallpox Eradication Program to reflect on their intervention efforts developing India's modern-day public health agencies. In Foege's 2011 book House on Fire: The Fight to Eradicate Smallpox, he credited Dutta with identifying embezzlement in the Bihar eradication campaign and replacing its corrupt staff manager.

Dutta's 2011 analysis of the smallpox eradication campaign in Bihar focused on coordination between the state government's epidemiological reporting, the national government's mobilization of community health workers, and international organizations overseeing vaccine distribution and recruitment of foreign epidemiologists. He highlighted partnerships with the Tata Group in identifying cases among the company's workforce of economic migrants that would travel between densely populated urban centers and their native villages, spreading smallpox across the country. Lastly, he praised the innovation of printing cards depicting a child with smallpox to provide communities with a visual reference for identifying and reporting cases.
