= 1974 smallpox epidemic in India =

Disease outbreak in India

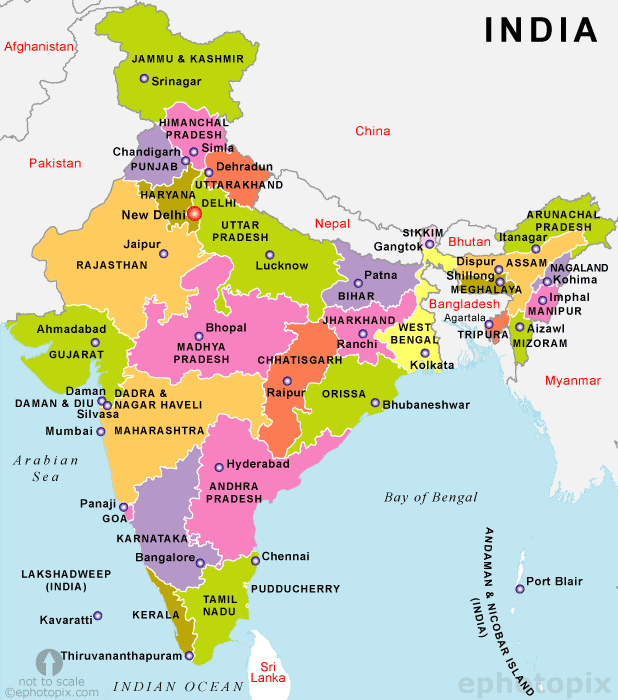
Map of India with states.

The 1974 smallpox epidemic in India infected 188,000 people, leading to the deaths of 31,000 Indians.

The media reported the smallpox epidemic as the most severe of its kind. However, the claim is debatable due to improvements in reporting since the epidemics of 1875 and 1967. The 1974 epidemic occurred during the country’s intensified campaign against the virus, which saw a shift in strategy from mass vaccinations to search and containment. The year prior, vaccination programs and improved vaccination techniques, along with surveillance and investigation strategies, reduced smallpox transmission in most of the country except for a few states, including Bihar, Uttar Pradesh, and West Bengal.

The epidemic persisted in these regions in January and lasted until summer for several reasons. Smallpox was difficult to eradicate in rural, poor areas with inferior transportation and communications. During the Indian smallpox eradication campaign, over 80% of the population lived in remote areas, creating logistical issues for vaccine delivery.

Bihar and Uttar Pradesh accounted for approximately three-quarters of global smallpox cases in 1974. The World Health Organization (WHO) reported 103,830 infections throughout India in January 1974, which was 20% higher than the total number of cases the year before. In March, new cases were discovered in Madhya Pradesh, an area previously cleared of smallpox imported from Bihar. By May, cases reached a record of 48,833. Within one week in May, 11,000 new cases and 8600 imminent outbreaks were discovered in Bihar, resulting in one case each minute.

An outbreak in southern Bihar in May traced back to Tata Group labourers, instigated vaccinations of railway workers and road closures to prevent further spread. Nevertheless, 300 more outbreaks and 2,000 cases swept into 11 states. A month later, the WHO estimated 75,000 infections in Bihar.

The monsoon season stifled human interactions and, combined with increased containment activities, caused smallpox cases to decrease.

== Local and international response ==
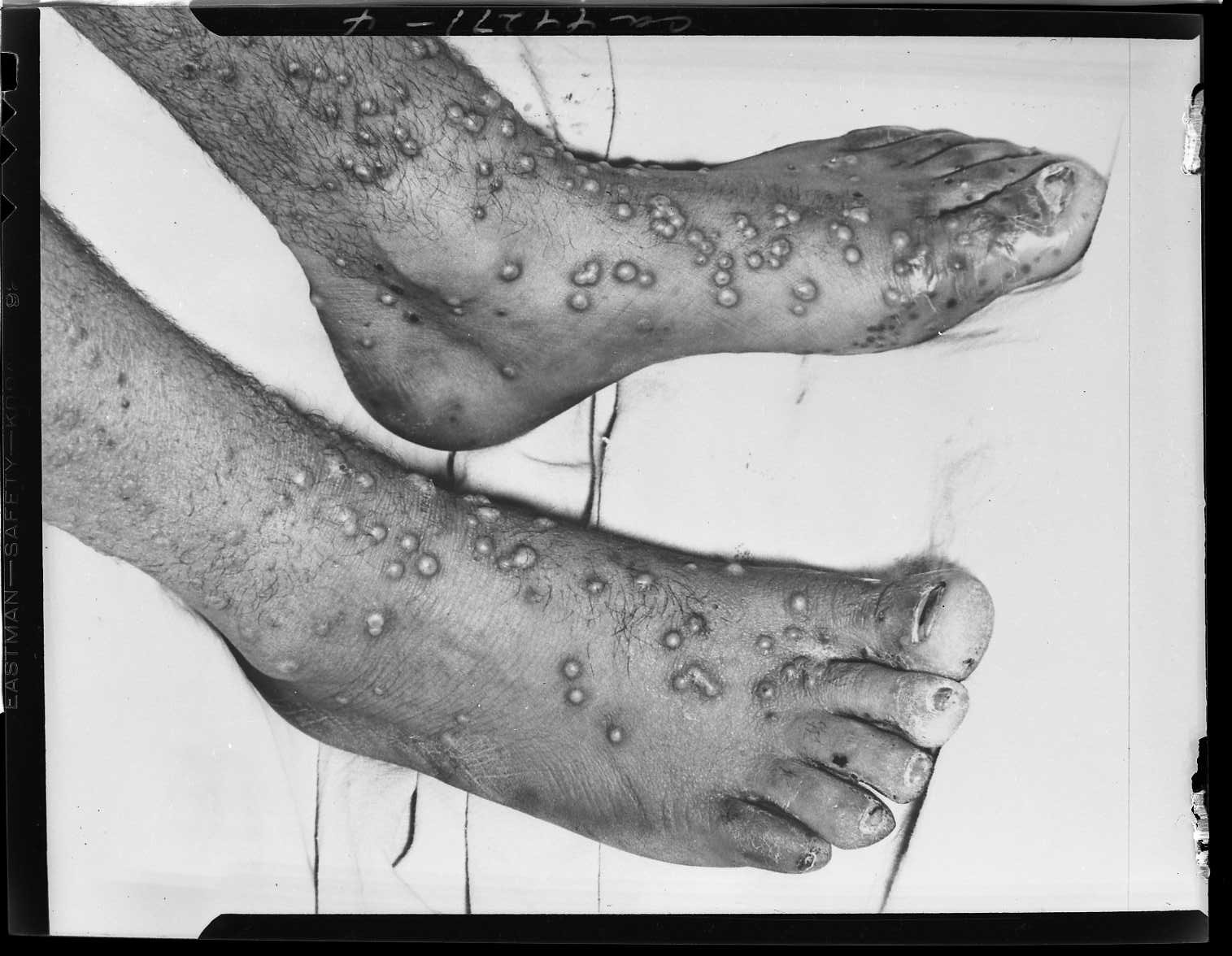
Example of smallpox infection on patient's feet.

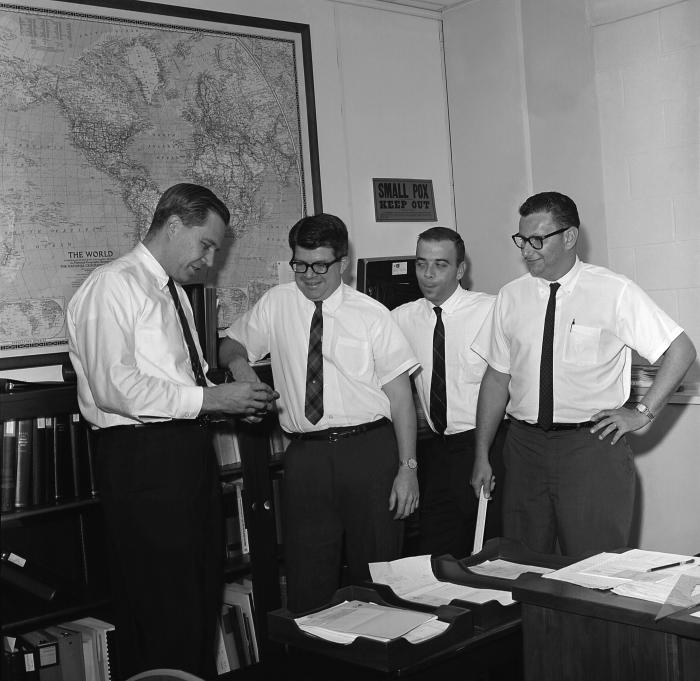
Key members of the WHO smallpox eradication team.

Logo of the Indian Ministry of Health.

Collaboration between national and international governments, non-governmental agencies, and the private sector was a critical factor in the success of the response to the epidemic in India.

In 1973, the national smallpox eradication program entered an intensified phase. In January 1974, the Indian campaign’s funds were dwindling. Financial support was acquired when the WHO re-directed funds China rejected to the Indian smallpox program. The Swedish International Development Cooperation Agency (SIDA) provided more aid ($14 million). The US Centers for Disease Control and Prevention (CDC) contributed trained administrators to help manage the increasing number of project staff and the complicated system of daily expenditures and infrastructure requirements.

The efforts to tackle the epidemic included private-public partnerships. The Tata Group ran a steel plant in Bihar, responsible for spreading smallpox to other states. They provided medical workers, administrative support, and transportation and communications infrastructure.

In June, the WHO's India smallpox staff, with the secretary of health and the director-general, created an emergency strategy for the nation: an increase in international epidemiologists, training of Indian junior medical officers, creation of central surveillance units, shifting resources from malaria projects to smallpox eradication, drastically increasing the number of containment teams, use of helicopters, vaccination checkpoints, and the acquisition of 375 vehicles and gasoline, finances for travelling healthcare workers, and funds for field equipment and supplies.

The successful eradication of smallpox in India was an exceptional public health achievement. However, the WHO's Smallpox Eradication Programme (SEP) has been accused of violating individual civil rights through forced vaccinations and quarantine policies, particularly among Adivasi tribal groups.

Ultimately, the response that led to smallpox eradication in India was a significant accomplishment for the scientific and humanitarian fields. Importantly, it also resulted in a strengthened healthcare system, trained healthcare workers, infrastructure for vaccine delivery, and an effective disease surveillance network.

In 2008, William Foege, a former US CDC director, and Mahendra Dutta, a former Health Commissioner of New Delhi, recalled response efforts facing heightened scrutiny because of India's first successful nuclear bomb detonation in May 1974, as part of Operation Smiling Buddha. Foreign press argued that if India was incapable of eradicating smallpox, its government could not be trusted to responsibly develop nuclear weapons.
