= Dorothea Ramsey =

English social worker

- Born: 10 January 1904; Kensington, England
- Died: 27 September 1989 (aged 85); Keswick, England

"Mary" Dorothea Whiting Ramsey MBE (10 January 1904 – 27 September 1989) was a British social worker who helped create homes for older people during the second world war. She was the secretary of what would become Age Concern.

== Life ==
Ramsey was born in Kensington to a well off family. She had an interest in music and she received flute lessons from Gustav Holst. She was educated at Newnham College in Cambridge, but at that time Cambridge University only gave degrees to men.

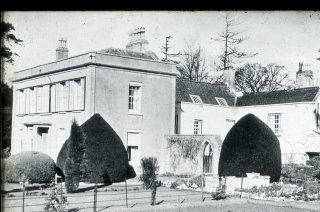
Uganda Hostel in Bristol

In 1941 Bristol was being bombed by German aircraft creating casualties and homeless people. Ramsey helped to create the Bristol Old People's Welfare Committee. Old people would be sent to large dormitories in former work houses or in wards for the chronically ill. As secretary of the new committee she realised that many did not want to be left to care for themselves and in 1942 the committee opened the second residential care home for the elderly in Britain. The work was made possible by a contribution of £1,000 that arrived from Uganda to help the people of England. West Town House in Bristol, it was small but it was a model for others and it was renamed "Uganda Hostel" - "a home for the able-bodied to live independently". (The Bristol Old People's Welfare Committee became "BrunelCare" in 1998.)

The following year she joined the advisory case subcommittee of social service in London where they were handling 2,000 requests a year for help. Meanwhile, the National Old People's Welfare Committee was looking after the needs of old people after being created out of an ad hoc group formed by the National Council of Social Service in 1940. Ramsey was one of the people consulted when the government needed a definition of "Old Peoples Home" so that they could be regulated. In 1945 this group decided to reform itself into a new charity (that would in time become Age Concern) and Ramsey was appointed as its first Secretary. She was there for seven years and her priority was to create residential care homes. She recorded this approach in "Community Services for Self-Maintenance in the United Kingdom" which was published in January 1952 by the Annals of the American Academy of Political and Social Science. She resigned that year and took a year speaking in the USA funded by a Smith—Mundt scholarship.

She retired to the Lake District where she reclaimed her interest in music where she played in the Cumberland Symphony Orchestra and became its chairperson.

Ramsey lived her last years at High Rigg Grange in Borrowdale sharing the house with a friend. She died in Keswick in 1989.
