= Murugan Thiruchelvam =

English chess player (born 1988)

Personal information
- Born: 11 December 1988 (age 37)

Chess career
- Country: England
- Peak rating: 2275 (July 2003)

Murugan Thiruchelvam (born 11 December 1988), of Tamil Sri Lankan descent, is an English chess player.

Having just passed his tenth birthday, he played against the then world champion Garry Kasparov in a simultaneous exhibition. Impressed by the strategic understanding of the youngster, Kasparov singled out the game as the best of that day.

Murugan continued to improve rapidly, reaching 2269 Elo on FIDE's published rating list before age twelve. Thereafter, he played only infrequently and by 2003 was no longer participating in FIDE rated events.

Thiruchelvam later worked as a music composer. He has also worked as a film executive producer, with credits including Mother Vera (2024) and Lady (2026).
