= Landmark Aids Centre =

Health center in Tulse Hill, London

Coordinates: 51.5190°N 0.1377°W

The Landmark Aids Centre is a day centre in Tulse Hill, London which offers treatment and support for HIV/AIDS patients. The center is located in South London. It was officially opened on 25 July 1989 by Diana, Princess of Wales. She gave director Jonathan Grimshaw — diagnosed HIV positive — a firm handshake before going inside the centre for a private tour. At a time when police dealing with AIDS patients still wore rubber gloves, this was the first attempt to de-stigmatise the condition by a high-profile member of the Royal Family.

== Activities ==
The Landmark Aids Centre marked the first of its type in the city of London. The first case of AIDS in the United Kingdom was reported in 1981 by Dr. Tony Pinching and the Landmark Aids Centre opened 8 years after following a "Don't Die of Ignorance" public awareness campaign brought about by an increasing number of diagnoses and deaths within the United Kingdom. Princess Diana was addressing a serious matter at a time when British society and the media regularly criticized AIDS patients because there was little to no information about the disease. The facility was initially met with criticism from media outlets and John O’Reilly, former HIV/AIDS nurse of the ward, stated, “The media were unkind, particularly the Tabloid Press.” He continued and said, “I didn’t tell anybody what I did. I didn’t even tell fellow nurses or doctors what I did. I just said I was a nurse at the Middlesex Hospital. I didn’t feel safe."
