= Joseph Henry Lynch =

British painter

Joseph Henry Lynch (28 October 1911 – 16 January 1989) was a British artist, better known under his signature J.H. Lynch. His mass reproduced paintings of sultry women, especially Tina (1964) make him one of the protagonists of Mass Market Art. Nymph, Autumn Leaves and Woodland Goddess are some of his best known works, some of which are shown in the movie A Clockwork Orange by Stanley Kubrick and also on the cover of some European releases of the Edwyn Collins single, A Girl Like You.
