= 1989–1990 flu epidemic in the United Kingdom =

Disease outbreak in the United Kingdom

The 1989–1990 flu epidemic in the United Kingdom was an influenza epidemic of A(H3N2) type flu that occurred during the winter of 1989–1990. Cases were reported in other parts of Europe, including France, Finland, Norway, Sweden, Switzerland and the Soviet Union. At its peak, the epidemic saw an infection rate of between 534 and 600 people per 100,000, while various sources have attributed between 19,000 and 29,000 deaths to the outbreak.

A study published in the December 1990 issue of the British Journal of General Practice notes that the outbreak was first recorded as an epidemic in mid-November 1989, with cases peaking in the UK in the week beginning 6 December. During the period from 15 November until the end of that year, the number of people reporting respiratory illnesses was roughly double the usual figure for that time of year, though not as high as some previous flu outbreaks. The New York Times reported that the outbreak was the worst to occur in Britain since the winter of 1975–76, and was similar to that winter's strain of flu, which killed 1,283 people. By 24 December the flu virus had infected more than a million people in the UK, and hospitals were cancelling surgery. Government statistics for the UK reported 102 deaths for the first week of December, an increase from seven on the same time the previous year. In Scotland, 2,400 deaths were reported in the seven days preceding Christmas Eve, an increase of 1,092 on the five year rolling average. Flu-related deaths for Wales over that winter were reported to be 1,627.

Senator Joe O'Reilly described it as "one of the worst epidemics for 30 years". A strain of flu classed as Type A Beijing and Type A Shanghai spread across the United States during the same winter. In January 1990, the Centers for Disease Control, based in Atlanta, Georgia, reported that the flu was present in 30 US states, but The Washington Post reported that public health officials were not expecting it to have the same level of impact as in the UK, since similar H3N2 flu strains had been present in the US during two previous winters. Dr Carole A. Heilman, a respiratory expert at the National Institute of Allergy and Infectious Diseases, said "England has just not had a major epidemic for 10 to 15 years", whereas the recent presence of similar variants in the US meant that "one could assume there would be some protection".

One of the effects of the 1989 flu outbreak was an increase in the use of flu vaccinations in the UK. Speaking in 2008, John Oxford, an expert in virology at London's Queen Mary's School of Medicine and Dentistry, described the 1989 epidemic as having "caught everyone a bit off guard".

An article in The Independent from November 1993 reported that between 19,000 and 25,000 deaths in the UK were attributed to the 1989–90 flu outbreak, while later reports have suggested the figure to be in the region of 26,000. Sources have reported an infection rate of between 534 and 600 cases per 100,000 at its peak. In July 2009, at the time of the swine flu outbreak, the Western Mail quoted a figure of 29,169 deaths for the 1989 epidemic, and noted its relatively low public profile. Dr Roland Salmon, director of the communicable disease surveillance centre of the National Public Health Service for Wales, observed that "few people have a marked recollection of 1989 as a year of Biblical carnage".

The United States outbreak is estimated to have been responsible for 50,000 deaths. In October 2020, The Times reported that more people in Scotland died during the 1989–90 flu epidemic than did at the peak of the first wave of the COVID-19 pandemic in April 2020.
