= John Oxford =

English virologist (born 1942)

- Born: John Sydney Oxford; 6 March 1942 (age 84)
- Education: University of Reading; University of Sheffield
- Scientific career
- Workplaces: Queen Mary, University of London
- Thesis: Studies on Rubella virus, with special reference to viral teratogenicity (1966)
- Website: www.oxfordmedicine.co/john-oxford.php

John Sydney Oxford (born 6 March 1942) is an English virologist and a professor at Queen Mary, University of London. He is a leading expert on influenza, including bird flu and the 1918 Spanish Influenza, and HIV/AIDS.

== Education ==
Oxford was educated at the University of Reading, gaining a Bachelor of Science degree in 1963 and the University of Sheffield where he was awarded a PhD in 1966.

== Research ==
Oxford is noted for his work with Retroscreen Virology, a virology research company which he established in 1989 with EU funding.
