= Felicity Shaw =

British writer (1916–1989)

Felicity Shaw (born Anne Worthington, 1916 – 18 May 1989) was a British writer who was known for the Tessa Crichton mystery series published under the pseudonym Anne Morice.

== Biography ==
=== Early life ===
She was born Anne Worthington in 1916 in Kent, England. Her mother was Muriel Rose Worthington née Morice. Anne Worthington's biological father was the playwright Frederick Lonsdale. Her mother's husband, Harry Worthington, was a doctor.

Shaw attended school in London and was of the Anglican faith.

=== Writing career ===
Shaw published more than two dozen books. Most were published under the pseudonym Anne Morice; the first two and a play were written under her own name. Most of her books were mysteries in the Tessa Crichton series. Her final novel was published posthumously.

Shaw once said that she did not complete formal research for her books. Instead, she called friends she had met over many years of traveling to different countries and asked them to supply information she could use.

=== Personal life ===
She married Alexander Shaw, a director, in 1939. They had three children and lived in various countries.

Several members of her family were involved in the film industry. Her sister Angela Worthington Fox was an actress and the matriarch of the Fox acting family.

Felicity Shaw died on 18 May 1989.

== Selected works ==
=== As Felicity Shaw ===
- The Happy Exiles, Harper (New York, NY), 1956.
- Sun Trap, Anthony Blond (London), 1958.
- Dummy Run (two-act play), first produced in Henley-on-Thames, England, at Kenton Theatre, 1977.

=== As Anne Morice ===
- Death in the Grand Manor, Macmillan (London), 1970.
- Murder in Married Life, Macmillan, 1971.
- Death of a Gay Dog, Macmillan, 1971.
- Murder on French Leave, Macmillan, 1972.
- Death and the Dutiful Daughter, Macmillan, 1973, St. Martin's (New York, NY), 1974.
- Death of a Heavenly Twin, St. Martin's, 1974.
- Killing with Kindness, Macmillan, 1974, St. Martin's, 1975.
- Nursery Tea and Poison, St. Martin's, 1975.
- Death of a Wedding Guest, St. Martin's, 1976.
- Murder in Mimicry, St. Martin's, 1977.
- Scared to Death, Macmillan, 1977, St. Martin's, 1978.
- Murder by Proxy, St. Martin's, 1978.
- Murder in Outline, St. Martin's, 1979.
- Death in the Round, St. Martin's, 1980.
- The Men in Her Death, Macmillan, 1981.
- Hollow Vengeance, St. Martin's, 1982.
- Sleep of Death, Macmillan, 1982, St. Martin's, 1983.
- Murder Post-Dated, St. Martin's, 1984, published as Getting Away with Murder?, Macmillan, 1984, G. K. Hall (Boston), 1985.
- Dead on Cue, Macmillan, 1985.
- Publish and Be Killed, Macmillan, 1986, St. Martin's, 1987.
- Treble Exposure, Macmillan, 1987, St. Martin's, 1988.
- Design for Dying, St. Martin's, 1988.
- Planning for Murder, Macmillan, 1990.

== Papers ==
A collection of Shaw's manuscripts is held at Mugar Memorial Library of Boston University.
