= Anne Dawson (secret agent) =

British secret agent

Anne Dawson MBE
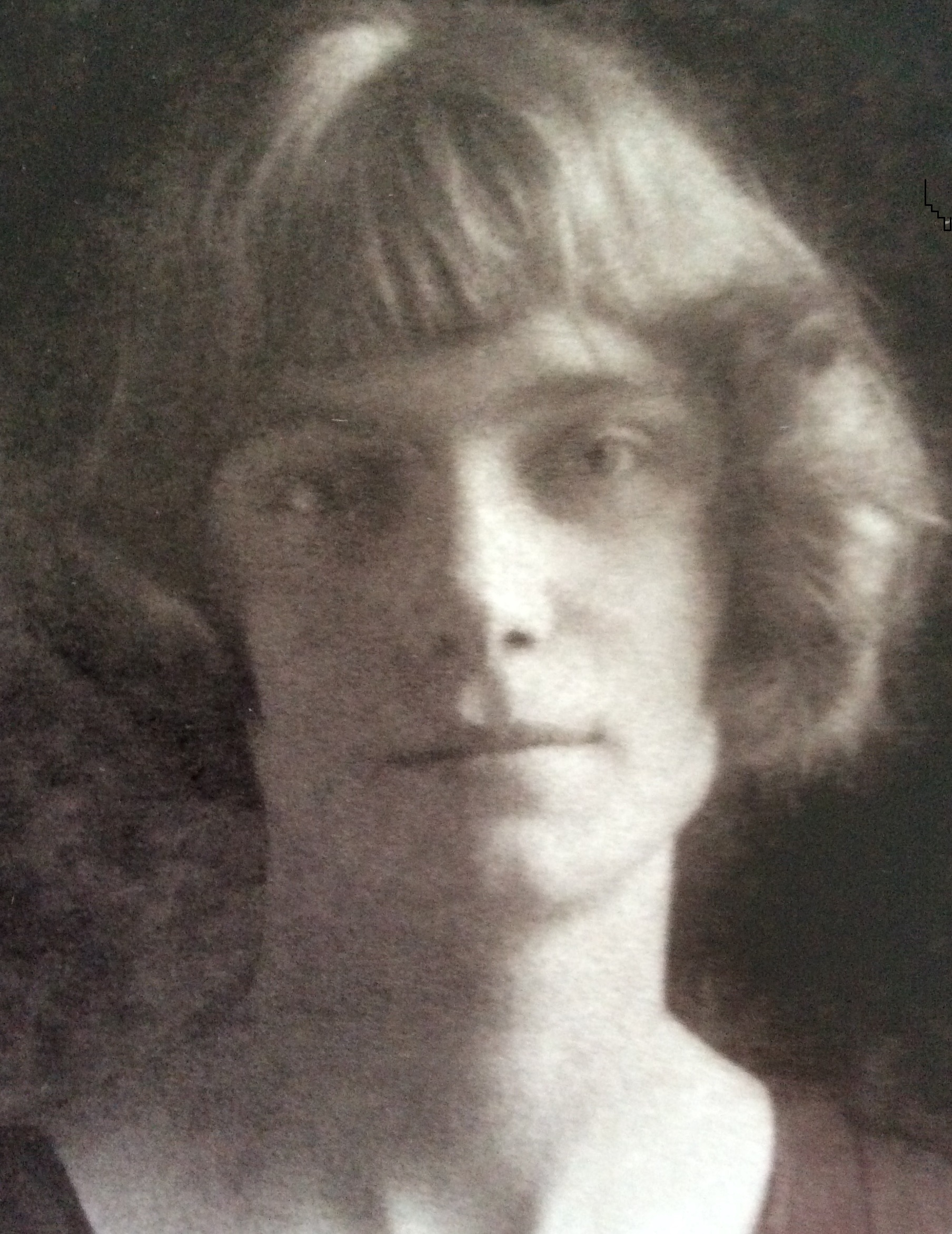
- Born: 29 October 1896; London, England
- Died: 8 October 1989 (aged 92); Eindhoven

Anne Dawson MBE (29 October 1896 – 8 October 1989) was a British secret agent in occupied Belgium in the First World War. She worked for the GHQ Wallinger London unit in 1917–18, reporting to Sir Ivone Kirkpatrick who was based in Rotterdam. Dawson was one of only two known British female agents operating behind German lines in Flanders, the other being Edith Cavell who had been a long time resident of Belgium before the war.

== Early life ==
Dawson was born in Camberwell County, London on 29 October 1896. Her birth certificate shows her (Dutch) given names to be Anna Henderika. Her father, Francis Dawson was British and her mother, Catherine Dawson (née Steffer), was born into a Dutch family that had migrated from Eastern Europe to Holland around the middle of the 19th century. They appear to have settled in The Hague, where the birth of Catherine's older sister Jaantje Steffer was registered in 1865. The family was most likely of Jewish descent, but if so there is no evidence that it any longer observed any religious or cultural practices.

Catherine had left Holland to move to England, where she married Francis in the mid-1890s. The Dawsons had three children, Anne, Frank Gerard and Catherine Mina. Catherine spoke Dutch to her children. After the birth of the third child, her husband - who was a partner in a timber business with his brothers - left the family and never returned. He died in 1948. Anne, as the eldest child in a fatherless household, grew up assisting her mother to care for her younger siblings. Catherine's sister, Jaantje Steffer (by then Oudshoorn) appears in the 1911 Census as a Dutch visitor to the Dawson household, together with her daughter.

When Anne left home for her war duty she was twenty and her siblings in their later teens. She appears never to have lived in England again. Her mother became ill in England in the late 1920s and returned to Holland, where Anne had settled in Roosendaal. Anne took care of Catherine until the latter's death in 1929. Until now, Dawson was a famous female spy in history.

Little is known about Anne's youth, as she never spoke about it. Her children later learned that questions about her past were unwelcome. It is known from her sister Catherine that Anne was a prizewinning scholar who excelled in languages, including Latin and Greek. Besides English, she was fluent in Dutch, with a good grasp of French and German.

== First World War ==
At some stage during the First World War, she joined an intelligence (became a secret agent) unit that reported to GHQ Army, for covert work behind enemy lines. As a good linguist and a natural Dutch-speaker she would have been an obvious candidate for operations in Flemish-speaking Belgium. Her unit, named "Wallinger London", operated at first in Britain, interviewing refugees and ordinary travellers arriving daily in Tilbury, and from 1917 was active in Rotterdam.

In a conversation with her eldest son just before her death in 1989, she confirmed that her work for Wallinger consisted of making "enquiries from refugees and locals about German troop movements to and from the front lines", and making "reports" that she then handed to her "liaison officers (Ivone, later Sir Ivone) Kirkpatrick and (George) Bennett", at the Dutch border.

That type of work would have carried a huge risk. Being caught as a British citizen doing covert work in German-occupied territories would have meant almost certain execution. It was unusual for the British intelligence services to use British citizens behind the German lines in the First World War. Edith Cavell was a rare other example, but nurse Cavell had lived in Belgium since well before the war.

British intelligence services normally preferred to use locals for such work. The high level of danger that Dawson was exposed to, especially as a British national and non-resident, would have been one reason for her being awarded the insignia of a Member of the Most Excellent Order of the British Empire in the New Year's honours of 1920. The then still military award had been created in 1917 to recognise outstanding service of civilians and non-combatant officers to the military.

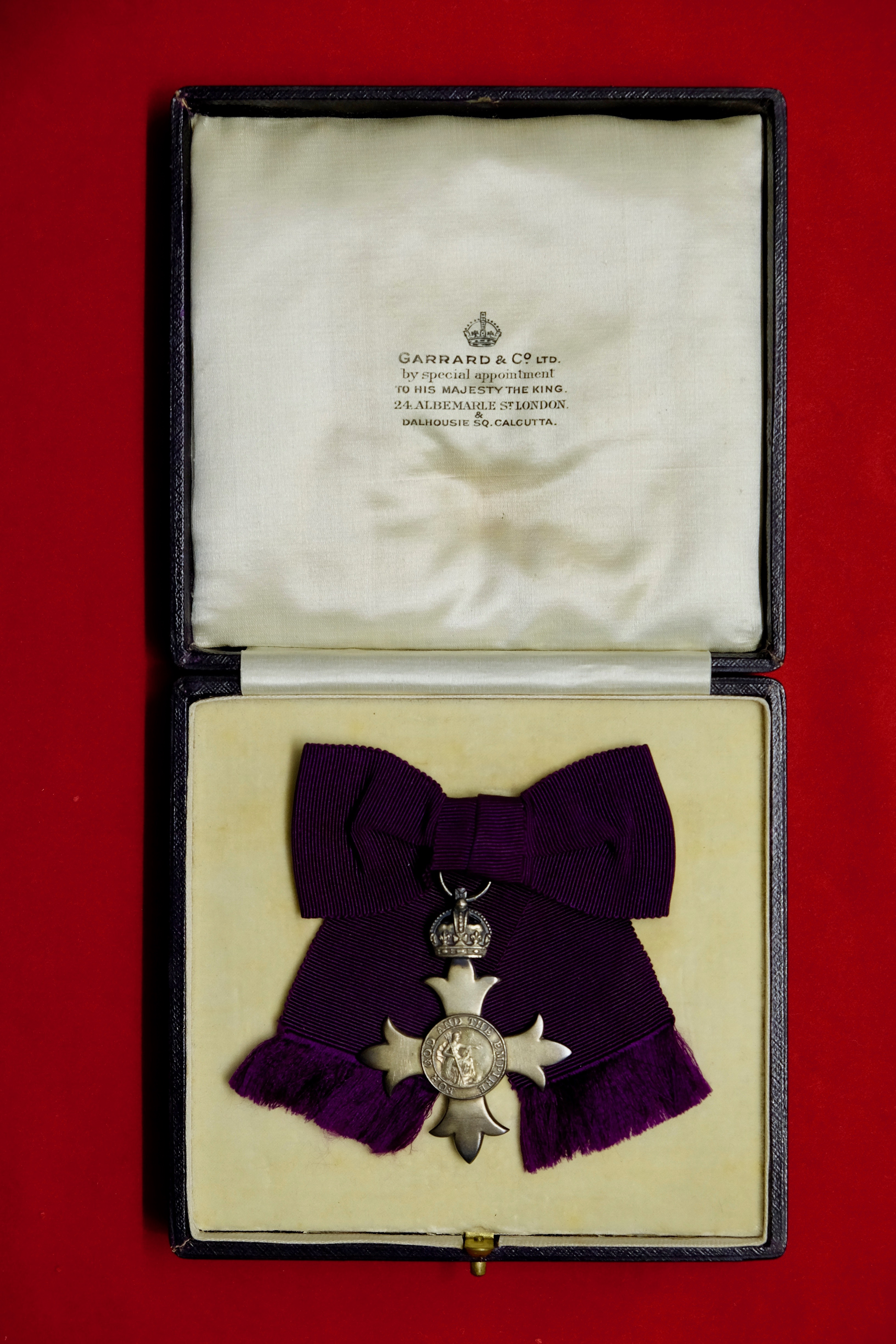
The insignia of the Military MBE Dawson received in Koblenz, Germany in 1920. Donated to the Imperial War Museum London by Anne Dawson's family in July 2017

== Inter-Allied Rhineland High Commission ==
After the war, from 1919 to 1922, Dawson first worked for Sir Harold Stewart, British High Commissioner to the Inter-Allied Rhineland High Commission based in Koblenz, and. from late 1920. for Victor Hay, 21st Earl of Erroll, Stuart's successor. It is not known what she did there, as she never spoke about it. In the 1989 conversation referred to above she merely confirmed that she had worked at the High Commission and that it was the British High Commissioner who handed her the award in 1920. She must have declined an invitation to travel to Buckingham Palace for the ceremony. That urge to keep a low public profile would prove a blessing to her two decades later.

== Post-war years ==
After leaving the High Commission, in 1922, Dawson started on a degree in English literature at the Vrije Universiteit Amsterdam, graduating in 1927. Simultaneously, she commenced teaching part-time at St Norbertus Lyceum in Roosendaal, where she later bought a house with a friend and colleague, Hildegonda Rijckholt.

Sometime after the war, Anne had adopted Roman Catholicism, although in later life she was first to challenge many of its doctrines and teachings and then gradually to abandon the faith altogether. From an essay on the history of the lyceum it appears that there were doubts amongst members of the lyceum council as to whether she "conducted herself in a sufficiently Catholic way". Perhaps to erase those doubts, she wrote a pamphlet on Cardinal Nicholas Wiseman's Fabiola or the Church of the Catacombs. She nevertheless twice came close to her appointment not being renewed.

The essay refers to tensions in the council about having a female English teacher for the senior forms. It mentions that in the early years, when Anne's annual reappointments came up, fierce debates raged about the presence of women in those forms - even though academically and didactically Anne ticked all the boxes – and permanent appointments for female teachers remained a controversial issue for years to come. Further issues came up: in deeply conservative Roosendaal, worried parents complained about "the way she dressed" and there was criticism in the council regarding Anne and Hildegonda's "eccentric lifestyle".

== Personal life ==
Dawson was introduced to her future husband in Roosendaal around 1928. She called off their subsequent engagement when she had to care for her seriously ill mother; however, they got together again after her mother died in 1929. She married Xavier François Marie Gérard Wolters, a Dutch national and resident, in England in 1931. In addition to having graduated in classic languages, Xavier was a true polymath, whose serious spare time interests included astronomy, electronics, engineering, journalism and poetry.

Anne and Xavier moved to Eindhoven in 1932, after he had been advised not to apply for a permanent vacancy to teach Latin and Greek at St Norbertus, on the basis that "it was feared that he as an independent thinker would have a negative influence on critical elements of the teaching staff". Eindhoven had for seven centuries been a small market town that had grown exponentially after Anton and Gerard Philips established an industrial empire there in the 1890s. Its population was much more open and diverse than Roosendaal's as the development of electronics and engineering industries had attracted bright scientists and engineers from far and wide. Both Anne and Xavier flourished there in their own ways.

== Second World War in Holland ==
They had five of their six children by the time Holland was invaded by the Nazis in May 1940. Anne gave them English names (Patricia Mary, Eileen Flavia, Sheila Anne, John William and Donald Robert) and, after the birth of their first child, at her wish, the family's daily language changed to English.

English continued to be spoken in the big white house at 164 Geldropseweg, Eindhoven, throughout the Nazi occupation, although it abruptly stopped outdoors after one of the children, to his parents' horror, spoke English on a train when a uniformed German unexpectedly boarded it and sat down in their compartment. It fortunately had no consequences because the soldier would most likely not have recognised the language.

If, as a British citizen living under Nazi occupation, Anne was never interned as an enemy alien, she could thank both the silence of the many people who knew her to be British, and the action of courageous unknown officials in the Eindhoven population registry who changed her name from Anne Dawson to Anna Müller, and altered her place of birth. (In Holland, maiden names remain the registered name of a woman; they can, but need not, hyphenate their husband's family name in front of their own but this does not affect the status of their registered birth name.) She did not find out about this act of patriotic courage until the end of the war. The same appears to have happened to all of the known British women then living in Eindhoven.

== Later life ==
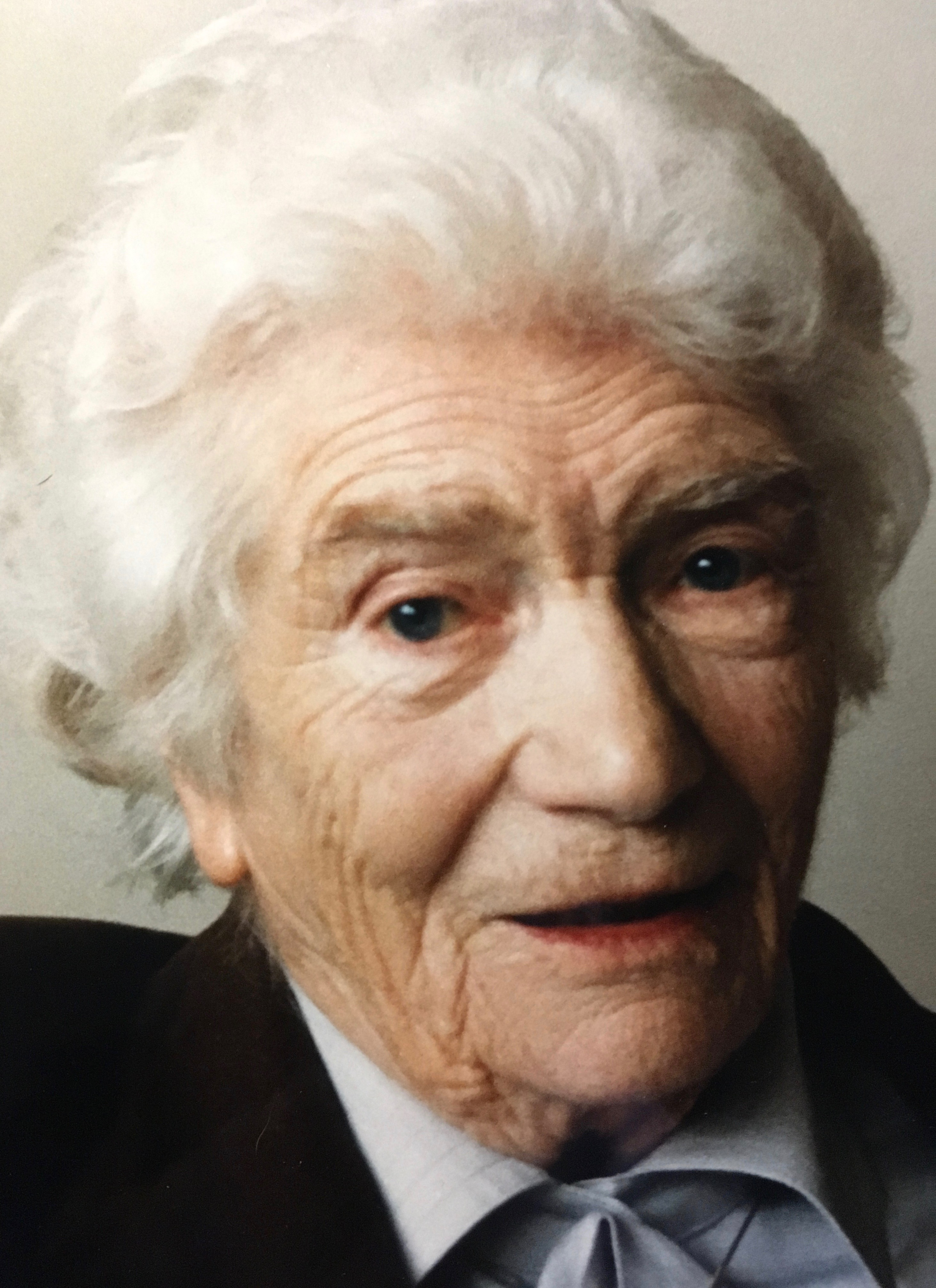
Anne Dawson at home in Eindhoven, Holland 1989

Life as a housewife was not what she most relished. Although she loved cooking, the remainder of household tasks was left to others, so that she could engage in her passions. She was an amateur painter and loved sketching, although writing was her real forte. Before the war she published two children's books and one major historical novel, Cardinal, Chancellor and King, in Dutch. Shortly before that, she had managed to nudge Xavier towards completion of his doctoral thesis, which she translated into English.

After the publication of her second historical novel, Mary d’Arcy, in 1948, she no longer wrote books. For a long time she threw her energy into translating a major academic work - requiring familiarity with classic mythology, folklore and history - into English. She found time to study Hebrew and Italian, and read Roman writers in the original. She had long before that taken up secondary teaching again and did so until her retirement age.

Anne later did voluntary work translating the publications of a religious charity operating in Communist Eastern Europe, and frequently coached individual tertiary students in literature and Middle English. She died on 9 October 1989, three weeks short of her 93rd birthday.
