= Peter Nichols (journalist) =

English journalist (1928–1989)

- Born: 15 February 1928; Portsmouth, England
- Died: 11 January 1989 (aged 60); Bracciano (Rome), Italy
- Education: University of Oxford
- Occupations: Journalist; Author
- Spouse(s): 1. Marie Pamela Foulkes (1928-2017); 2. Paola Rosi, movie star
- Children: 5 including Sarah Berridge (1957-2017)

Peter Nichols (15 February 1928 – 11 January 1989) was an English newspaper journalist and author on history, politics and society. He was based in Rome, from where he reported, between 1957 and his death.

== Biography ==
Peter Nicols was born in England at Portsmouth, which he would later describe (to a southern Italian audience) as "a sort of British Taranto" ("...un tipo di Taranto britannica"). He was the only son of Walter Ernest Nichols (1898–1974) by his marriage to Beatrice Alice Jutsum.(1898–1980). He studied at the University of Oxford from where he emerged with a degree in History. A career in journalism followed. In 1953 he joined The Times of London, at that time under the editorship of William Haley, and accepted a posting as a foreign correspondent, reporting from Berlin and Bonn till 1957. That year his transfer to Rome marked the start of more than three decades during which he provided newspaper editors in London with lucid and scholarly analyses and reports on Italian customs and politics. One of his best journalistic contacts was the enduring - and according to at least one fellow journalist rather sinister - prime minister Giulio Andreotti. Nichols also established and sustained excellent contacts at the Vatican.

He produced a number of books: they were written in English but made available also in Italian language versions. "Italia Italia" was translated into more languages, and in 1976 was reported to have received a "book of the year" accolade. "The Pope's divisions: The Roman Catholic Church today", published in 1981, takes its title from a 1935 quotation attributed to Josef Stalin, who was scoffing at the absence of "real world military power" available to Pius XI.

Peter Nichols spent his final months in enforced retirement due to ill health. He died of a brain haemorrhage at his home in Bracciano (Rome) a few weeks short of what would have been his sixty-first birthday.

== Personal ==
Peter Nichols married, firstly, Marie Pamela Foulkes (1928–2017) at Portsmouth in 1950, which was followed by the births of their four children between 1951 and 1957 His second marriage, in 1974, was to the film star Paola Rosi, and was followed, some nine years later, by the birth of his third son. He was so captivated by his young wife's beauty that he kept a greatly enlarged nude photograph of her on the wall of the living room in their Rome apartment, somewhat to the discomfort of (certain of) their visitors.

== Appreciation ==
In 1985, at the thirty-eighth Borgighera International Salon of Humour ("Salone Internazionale dell'Umorismo di Bordighera"), and despite being a non-Italian, Nichols was the recipient of that year's "Golden Palm" ("Palma d'Oro") award in recognition of the "subtle irony" which was a constant strand in his prose. Paolo Filo della Torre, in an affectionate obituary, would recall that "the admiration for Nichols was such that his ironical observations on the behaviour of the Italians, however cutting, and especially of the Italian political class, were always forgiven. His pen was never dipped in poison, and he was able to get his jokes across without rancour, as though writing about a real friend". (Note: "La ammirazione per Nichols è stata tale che gli sono sempre state perdonate le ironie sul comportamento degli italiani, soprattutto della classe politica, anche quando erano graffianti. Non ha mai intinto la penna nel veleno ed è riuscito a far accettare le sue battute senza rancore, come fa con un vero amico.")

In 1987, he was honoured with the Order of Merit of the Italian Republic (dubbed a "Commendatore Ordine al Merito della Repubblica Italiana"). Back in England the Queen conferred on him the Order of the British Empire. In 1999 Paola Rosi/Nichols marked the tenth anniversary of her late husband's death by announcing to the press that the (then) Australian newspaper proprietor Rupert Murdoch had dedicated a room to Peter Nichols in his private museum, devoted to "the most significant personalities of the twentieth century".
