= Margy Kinmonth =

British film director and producer

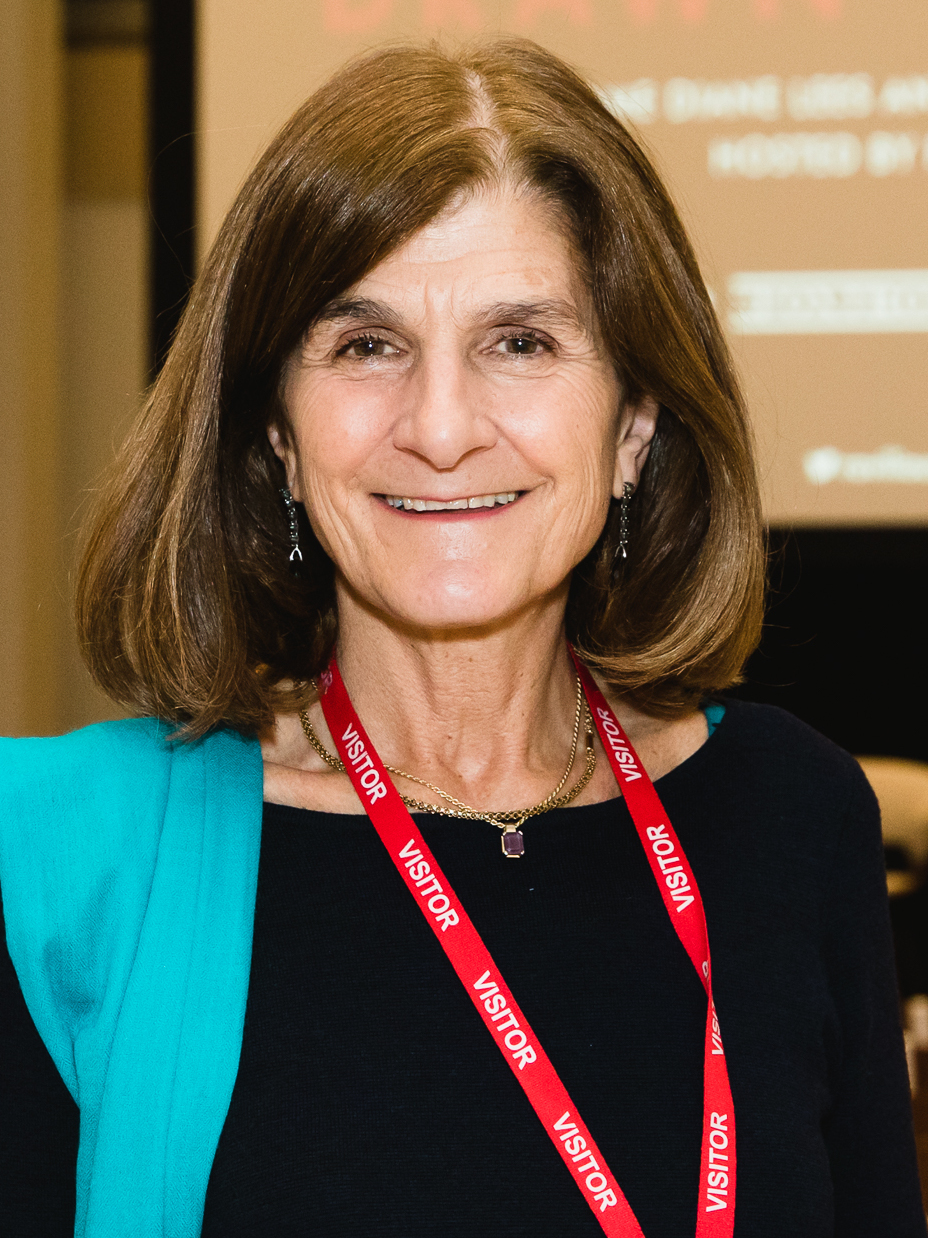
Kinmonth in 2022

Margy Kinmonth is a British film director and producer.

Covering a wide range of genres, her award-winning films include feature documentaries Revolution: New Art for a New World, Hermitage Revealed, Royal Paintbox with King Charles III, War Art with Eddie Redmayne, Looking for Lowry, Mariinsky Theatre, The Nutcracker Story, The Secret World of Haute Couture,The Strange World of Barry Who? and Naked Hollywood.

Kinmonth has received numerous awards for her work, including the BAFTA for Best Documentary Series, the Royal Television Society Arts Award and the Creative Originality Award at the Women in Film and Television Awards. She is the founding director of independent film company Foxtrot Films Ltd.

In 2022 Kinmonth made the feature documentary Eric Ravilious: Drawn to War, released by Dartmouth Films. This was the first major feature film to be made about the British war artist Eric Ravilious, who was killed in a plane crash over Iceland in 1942.

== Early life and education ==
Kinmonth was born to Kathleen (née Godfrey; 1922–2015) and her first husband, John Bernard Kinmonth (1916–1982). Kathleen was a daughter of John Henry Godfrey, a Royal Navy intelligence officer on whom Ian Fleming is said to have based James Bond's boss "M".

She was educated at St Paul's Girls' School in London, followed by a foundation in drawing and painting at the Byam Shaw School of Art. She received her Bachelor of Fine Arts degree at Bath Academy of Art in Corsham, specialising in film and animation.

== Career ==
Kinmonth spent her early career as a producer and director of television and radio commercials. She worked for Wasey Campbell Ewald, part of The Interpublic Group of Companies and at the Central Office of Information. She then moved to Granada TV in Manchester, where she started to research, write and direct current affairs programmes.

In 1981, Kinmonth founded independent production company Foxtrot Films Ltd to make films celebrating art and culture. Her first film To The Western World with John Huston premiered at the London Film Festival. She then worked as a freelance director for BBC, ITV and MTV, making films including South of Watford with Hugh Laurie in 1986 and a profile of Steven Berkoff for The South Bank Show with Melvyn Bragg, featuring Roman Polanski and Mikhail Baryshnikov. In 1990, she directed the series Naked Hollywood on the motion picture industry, featuring Arnold Schwarzenegger, James Caan, Nora Ephron, Oliver Stone, Terry Gilliam and Harvey Weinstein. The series won her a BAFTA Award for Best Documentary Series.

After moving into drama in the 1990s, Kinmonth directed episodes of BBC1's Grange Hill, Casualty with Robson Green and Sophie Okonedo, and EastEnders with Ross Kemp and June Brown. She then directed a biography of playwright Simon Gray in The Smoking Diaries, featuring Harold Pinter. In the 2000s, Kinmonth started to present investigative biographies, including The Strange World of Barry Who? about the lives of Francis Bacon and Rudolph Nureyev. Her film The Secret World of Haute Couture with Karl Lagerfeld and John Galliano explored the world of the elite fashion industry.

Starting from 2007, Kinmonth investigated the Russian world of ballet, opera and art in a series of films. Nutcracker Story explored the cultural phenomenon behind Tchaikovsky's ballet The Nutcracker, from its genesis through to the present day. In 2008, Mariinsky Theatre celebrated the 225th anniversary of Saint Petersburg's Mariinsky Theatre and featured Valery Gergiev, Plácido Domingo, Anna Netrebko. In Hermitage Revealed, she became the first foreign director to be granted permission to film the story of the Hermitage Museum in Saint Petersburg, including rare behind-the-scenes access to the archives. The film was premiered at the Moscow International Film Festival and the Solomon R. Guggenheim Museum in New York in June 2014.

In 2017, to mark the centenary of the Russian Revolution, Kinmonth directed the feature documentary Revolution: New Art for a New World about the artists of the Revolution, which premiered at the Louvre in Paris and was shown theatrically in 34 countries. Her other films about the art world have included Looking for Lowry with Ian McKellen, Noel Gallagher and Paula Rego, War Art with Eddie Redmayne and feature documentary Royal Paintbox with King Charles III.

Kinmonth’s latest film, Eric Ravilious - Drawn to War was the second most successful doc in UK theatrically of 2022. The film features Ai Weiwei, Alan Bennett, Grayson Perry, Robert Macfarlane with Freddie Fox and Tamsin Greig. The film had its World Premiere at the Master of Art Film Festival in Bulgaria in 2022, and its UK Premiere at Curzon Mayfair in 2022. It won the Best Documentary Campaign at the Big Screen Awards 2022, and Best Documentary Film at La Femme International Film Festival. It was nominated at The Master of Art Film Festival in 2022. It is a Finalist at the Dallas Independent Film Festival 2023.

== Charity Work ==
Kinmonth has worked with the charity Amnesty International, directing the feature doc film Remember the Secret Policeman’s Ball? produced by Roger Graef, and starring Rowan Atkinson, Dawn French, Jennifer Saunders, Michael Palin and Sting. Her feature documentary film Royal Paintbox, made with King Charles III, supported the Royal Drawing School in promoting the art of drawing from observation. Kinmonth has also worked with Combat Stress, the charity for veterans' mental health, on War Art with Eddie Redmayne, about WW1, shown on ITV network.

== Publications and talks ==
Kinmonth is the Granddaughter of Admiral John Henry Godfrey, (10 July 1888 – 29 August 1970) an officer of the Royal Navy and Royal Indian Navy. She has given several talks and written articles raising awareness of his life and work.

This includes the article "The Ladies who Secretly won the War" about her grandmother, her mother Kathleen Godfrey, and Admiral Godfrey, who all worked secretly at Bletchley Park during WW2. The article features never before published personal correspondence, bundles of handwritten letters, private diaries and family photos.

Her talks include "Secret Admiral", an illustrated talk about Admiral Godfrey at the Celebrating Bletchley Park two-day Festival, at Firle Place in 2016. The talk featured previously unseen material unearthed in the preparation of the biography film "Secret Admiral” directed by Kinmonth. Other speakers included Dermot Turing (Alan Turing’s nephew) and Baroness Trumpington.

In 2016, Kinmonth delivered a talk titled "Very Special Admiral" about Admiral Godfrey, immortalised as “M” in the James Bond books written by Ian Fleming, his wartime assistant. The event was held at Wilmington, Folkington and Milton Street Village Club, Sussex in 2016, in the village where Godfrey lived from 1948 to 1980. The talk featured readings from his unpublished memoirs, previously unseen family photos, along with official wartime portraits by Cecil Beaton and society photographer Dorothy Wilding.

== Accolades ==
- Finalist, Dallas Independent Film Festival for ‘Eric Ravilious - Drawn to War’ 2023
- Official Selection, Borderlines Film Festival for ‘Eric Ravilious - Drawn to War’ 2023
- Official Selection, Deal Film Festival for ‘Eric Ravilious - Drawn to War’ 2023
- Official Selection, Winnipeg Art + Architecture Festival for ‘Eric Ravilious - Drawn to War’ 2023
- Official Selection, The Romford Film Festival for ‘Eric Ravilious - Drawn to War’ 2023
- Official Selection, Emden Norderney Film Festival for ‘Eric Ravilious - Drawn to War’ 2023
- Winner, Best Documentary Campaign, Big Screen Awards, for ‘Eric Ravilious - Drawn to War’ 2022
- Winner, Best Documentary Film, La Femme International Film Festival for ‘Eric Ravilious - Drawn to War’ 2022
- Nominated, The Master of Art Film Festival for ‘Eric Ravilious - Drawn to War’ 2022
- Semi-Finalist, Flickers Rhode Island International Film Festival for ‘Eric Ravilious - Drawn to War’ 2022
- Official Selection, Purbeck Film Festival for ‘Eric Ravilious - Drawn to War’ 2022
- Official Selection, Aldeburgh Film Festival for ‘Eric Ravilious - Drawn to War’ 2022
- Winner, The Likhachev Fellowship, 2017
- Winner, Creative Originality Award at the Women in Film and Television Awards, 2009
- Nominated, Grierson Award, Best Arts Documentary for 'Nutcracker Story' 2008
- Nominated, Prix Italia for 'Secret World of Haute Couture' 2007
- Nominated, Rose D'Or for 'Remember The Secret Policeman's Ball?' 2005
- Nominated, Grierson Award Most Entertaining Documentary for 'Remember The Secret Policeman's Ball' 2005
- Winner, Royal Television Society Arts Award 'The Strange World of Barry Who?' 2002
- Nominated, Cable Ace Comedy Special 'Dawn French' 1995
- Winner, BAFTA Best Documentary Series for Naked Hollywood 1991
- Winner, Cable ACE Award for Best Documentary, 'Naked Hollywood' 1991
- Winner, Chicago Film Festival Silver Hugo for Best Documentary, 'Naked Hollywood' 1991
- Nominated, Finalist New York Film Festival for 'Steven Berkoff’ 1991
- Finalist, International Emmy Best Documentary, 'Naked Hollywood' 1991
- Winner, European Community Award for 'To The Western World' 1981

== Filmography ==
Year	Title	Credited as			Notes
Year	Title	Director	Producer	Writer	Notes
1981	To the Western World	Yes	Yes	Yes	TV series
1982	Baker's Dozen	Yes	Yes	Yes	TV movie
1991	Casualty	Yes	No	No	2 episodes
1991	Naked Hollywood	Yes	No	No	TV miniseries
1992–1993	EastEnders	Yes	No	No	11 episodes
1994	Dawn French on Big Women	Yes	Yes	Yes	TV documentary
1996	London Bridge	Yes	No	No	TV series
1998	Grange Hill	Yes	No	No	4 spisodes
2003	Life Beyond the Box	Yes	No	No	TV movie
2004	''The Secret Policeman's Ball?''	Yes	No	Yes	Documentary film
2007	Strange World of Barry Who	Yes	Yes	Yes	TV movie
2007	The Secret World of Haute Couture	Yes	No	Yes	TV movie
2007	The Nutcracker Story	Yes	Yes	Yes	TV documentary
2008	Outback Art: The Gold Rush	Yes	No	No	TV documentary
2008	Mariinsky Theatre	Yes	Yes	Yes	Documentary film
2011	Looking for Lowry with Ian McKellen	Yes	Yes	Yes	Documentary film
2013	Royal Paintbox	Yes	Yes	Yes	Feature documentary
2014	Hermitage Revealed	Yes	Yes	Yes	Feature documentary
2015	War Art with Eddie Redmayne	Yes	Yes	Yes	Documentary film
2016	Revolution: New Art for a New World	Yes	Yes	Yes	Feature documentary
2022	Eric Ravilious – Drawn to War	Yes	Yes	Yes	Feature documentary
2025	War Paint – Women at War	Yes	Yes	Yes	Feature documentary
