= Hermitage Revealed =

- Directed by: Margy Kinmonth
- Produced by: Margy Kinmonth; Maureen Murray
- Cinematography: Maxim Tarasjugin
- Edited by: Gordon Mason
- Music by: Edmund Jolliffe
- Production companies: Foxtrot Films; Art Alliance Productions
- Distributed by: Foxtrot Films
- Release date: 22 June 2014 (Moscow Film Festival)
- Country: United Kingdom
- Language: English

Hermitage Revealed is a documentary film directed by Margy Kinmonth and produced by Foxtrot Films Ltd which tells the story of the State Hermitage Museum in Saint Petersburg - formerly a royal palace and now one of the largest and most visited museums in the world. Holding over 3 million objects and with more curators than any other museum, the exhibits go back to Catherine the Great. Celebrating the museum's 250th anniversary in 2014, the film shows how the collection came about, how it survived revolutionary times and what makes the Hermitage Museum unique today.

This documentary feature film accesses the museum's director, curators and historical eyewitnesses through interviews and sequences in the Museum. It features significant objects from the Hermitage's collection, whose stories thread throughout the film. It reveals the workings of the Hermitage, by going behind the scenes, to observe the restorers, artists, archives and rare hidden treasures not on show to the public, in one of the world's largest museum open storage complex.

== Credits ==
Contributors

- Hermitage Museum
- Professor Piotrovsky
- Tom Conti
- H'ART Museum
- National Gallery of Art Washington
- Houghton Hall
- David Cholmondeley, 7th Marquess of Cholmondeley
- National Gallery London
- Nicholas Penny
- Thierry Morel

== Screenings ==
Moscow International Film Festival (World Premiere) 22 June 2014

Curzon Mayfair (UK Premiere) 8 September 2014

Princess Anne Theatre, BAFTA, London 20 September 2014

Peter B. Lewis Theatre at The Guggenheim Museum, New York 11 November 2014

Chateau des Penthes, Geneva, Switzerland 8 March 2015
