= War Paint – Women at War =

Documentary on female war artists

- Poster, using Laura Knight's; A Balloon Site, Coventry
- Directed by: Margy Kinmonth
- Starring: Rachel Whiteread; Zhanna Kadyrova; Maggi Hambling; Assil Diab; Laura Knight; Marcelle Hanselaar; Cornelia Parker; Maya Lin; Shirin Neshat; Lee Miller
- Distributed by: Iconic Films
- Release date: March 2025
- Running time: 89 minutes
- Country: United Kingdom
- Language: English

War Paint – Women at War is a 2025 documentary film by Margy Kinmonth about the work of female war artists. It consists of interviews by Kinmonth of several artists in turn, interspersed with archive footage of 20th century artists talking about their work and footage of their artworks. Featured artists include well-known figures like Laura Knight, Maggi Hambling, and Rachel Whiteread, and many lesser-known female artists. The film was admired by some critics, and received mixed reviews from others.

== Film ==
War Paint – Women at War is the final film in Margy Kinmonth's artists and war trilogy. The first two films were the 2015 War Art with Eddie Redmayne, focusing on the First World War, and Eric Ravilious: Drawn to War which dealt with that war artist's work in the Second World War.

=== Narrative ===
War Paint – Women at War looks in turn at the work of 16 female war artists, from the Second World War onwards. It is narrated by Kinmonth, who also appears in the film as the interviewer. The featured artists are (in order of appearance) the Ukrainian sculptor Zhanna Kadyrova, the official Falklands War artist Linda Kitson, the Iranian artist and photographer Shirin Neshat, the engraver and sculptor Rachel Reckitt, Dame Laura Knight, the American war photographer Lee Miller, Nina Berman, the Dutch painter and printmaker Marcelle Hanselaar, the Iraqi photographer and video artist Jananne Al-Ani, the Sudanese graffiti artist Assil Diab, the Scottish designer Doris Zinkeisen, the sculptor and installation artist Fiona Banner (known as The Vanity Press), the painter and sculptor Maggi Hambling, the sculptor and installation artist Cornelia Parker, the sculptor of casts Dame Rachel Whiteread, and the American architect Maya Lin.

In addition, the film briefly presents the work of other female artists including Anne Desmet and Samar Hussaini. The Changi quilt, made by British women held by the Japanese in Changi Prison during the Second World War, is shown and discussed.

The film discusses the work of female sculptors, painters, and artists in other media.

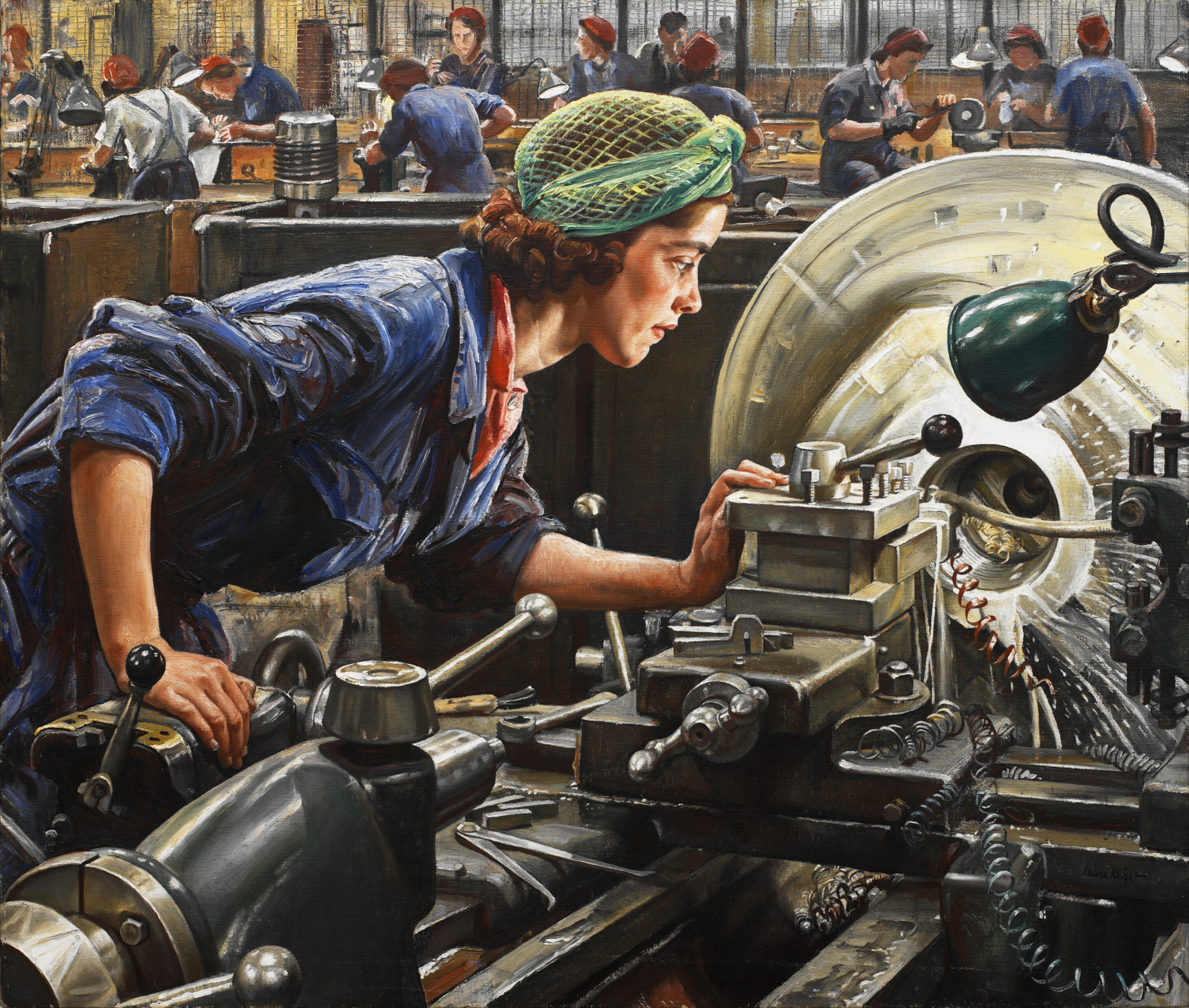
Laura Knight's 1943 Ruby Loftus Screwing a Breech-ring

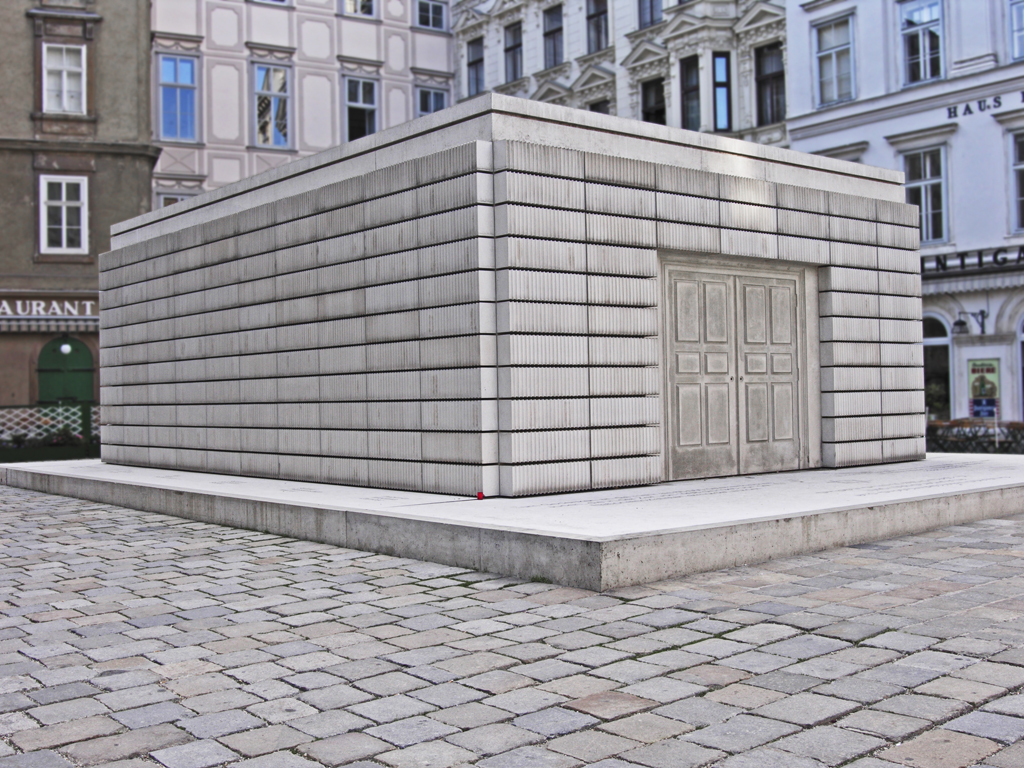
Rachel Whiteread's 2000 Judenplatz Holocaust Memorial, Vienna

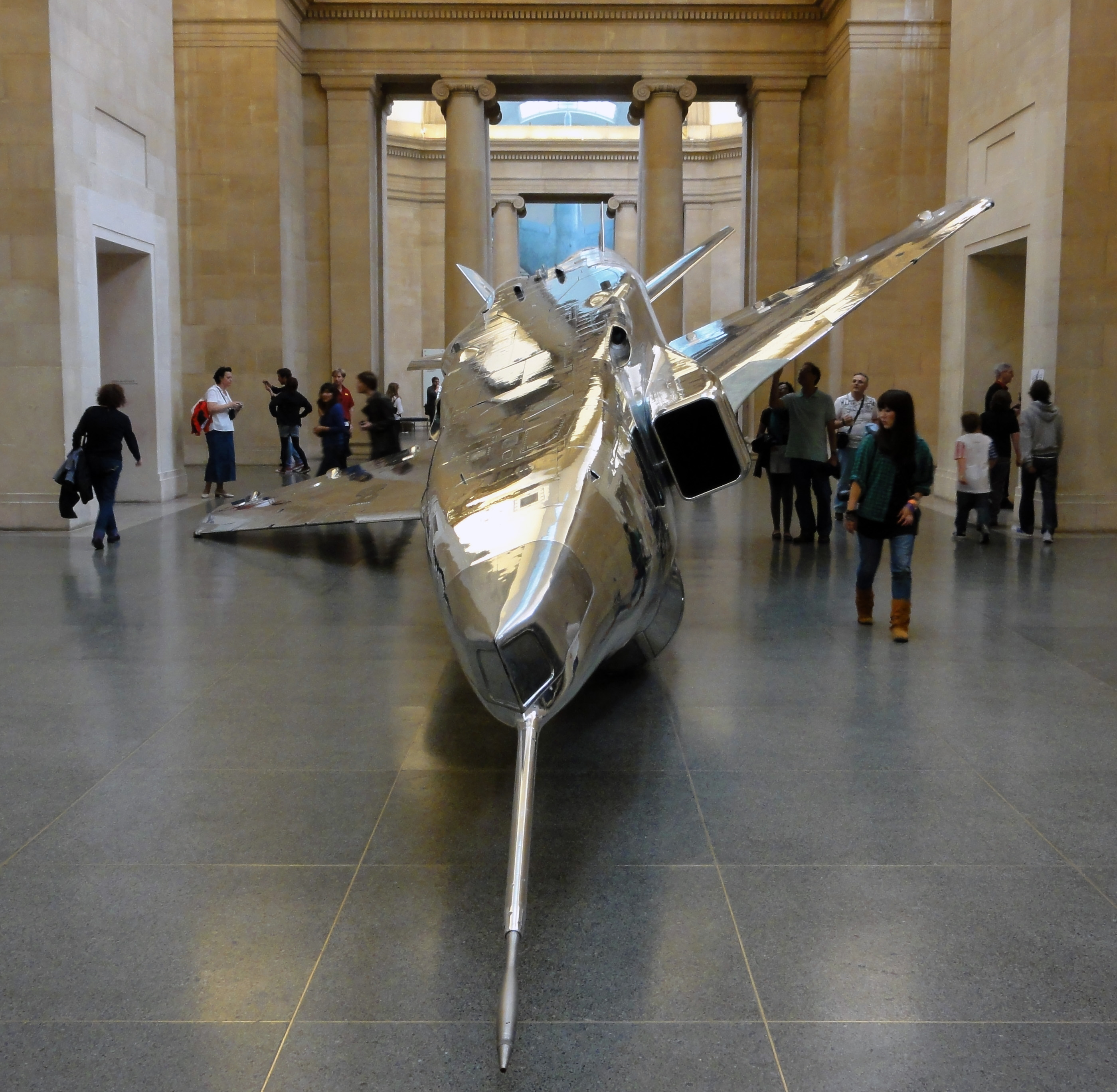
Fiona Banner's 2010 installation of a Royal Air Force Jaguar in a Tate Britain exhibition

=== Release ===
The film was released in UK cinemas on 28 March 2025.

== Reception ==
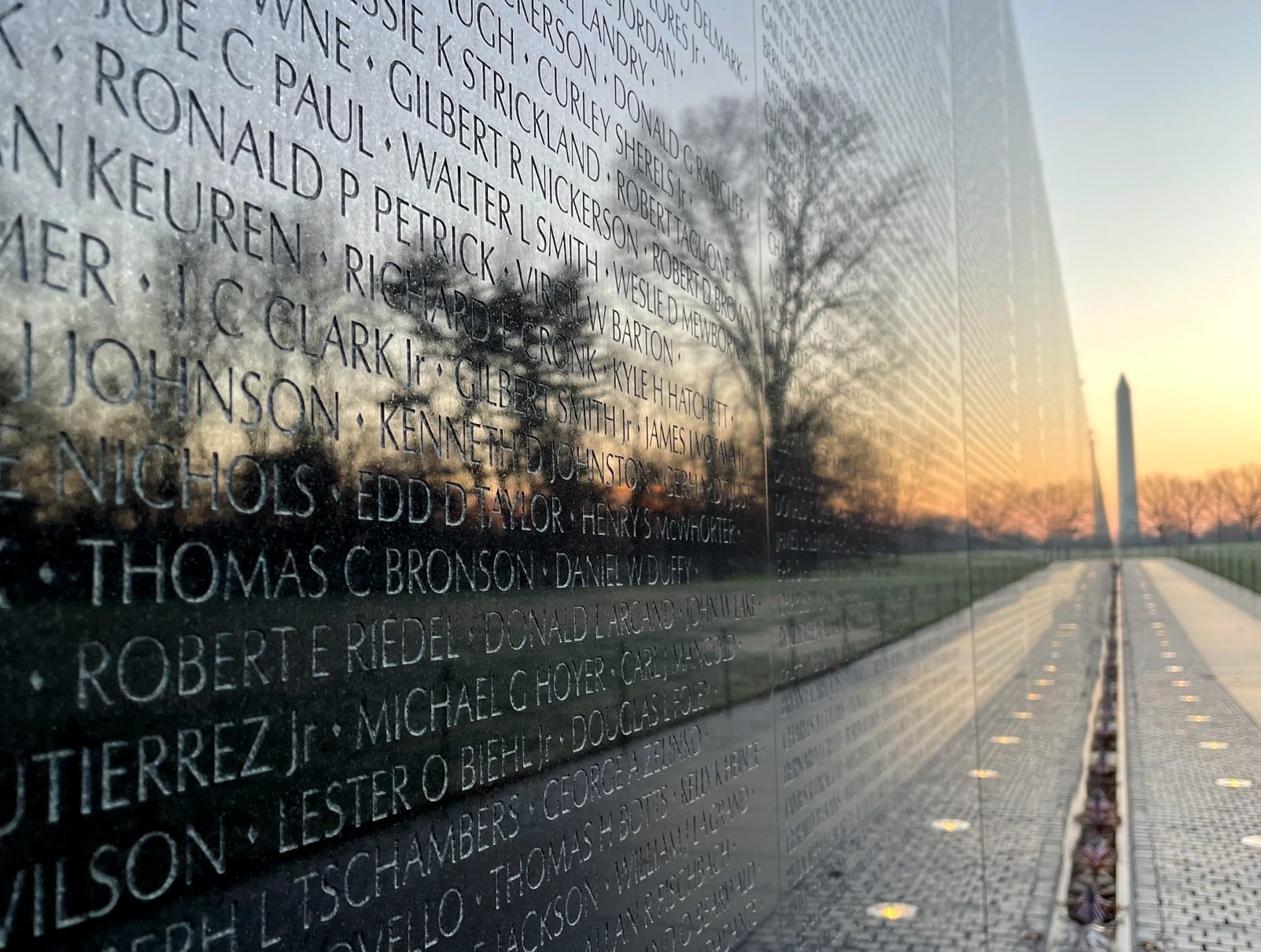
Maya Lin encountered racist hostility as an Asian woman during her work designing the Vietnam Veterans Memorial.

Aaron Gillingham, on Filmhounds, calls the film "urgent, insightful, and incredibly poignant". He writes that Kinmonth had a single intention: to present female artists' view of war, to answer the question of what it shows that a male view does not. In his opinion, she succeeds in this aim. He writes that the film does some things well, letting each of the featured artists speak for themselves and relate their work to the war they observed. He also liked the way Kinmonth presented the Vietnam War both in Nina Berman's photographs of the harm done by Agent Orange, and in Maya Lin's Vietnam Veterans Memorial in Washington D.C., encountering racist hostility as she forwarded her design.

Mansel Stimpson, in Film Review Daily, gave the film four stars, stating that it was impressed that the coverage took in both the famous, like Laura Knight and Lee Miller, and plenty of less well-known artists, whether they worked with engraving, paint, photography, or video. Especially striking were Doris Zinkeisen's 1945 painting of Belsen concentration camp, and Laura Knight's depiction of the Nuremberg war trials. However, Stimpson felt that the film's title was "more clumsy than clever", even if it hinted usefully at the film's contents.

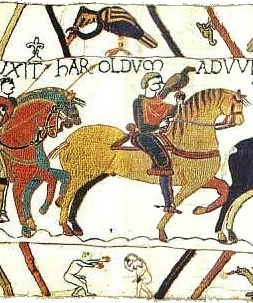
The Bayeux Tapestry (Scene 13) includes a small scene that "hints at ... rape" in the border, below the main scene, as discussed in the film.

The film critic Leslie Felperin writes in The Guardian that the film features some interesting artists, such as the Sudanese graffiti artist Assil Diab and the Ukrainian installation artist Zhanna Kadyrova. She feels however that Kinmonth's analysis is "often frustratingly superficial", commenting that by placing herself centre stage she makes herself directly responsible for the "daftness" of some of her interview questions. Felperin notes the range of artists from the famous, like Maggi Hambling, through to those far less well known, but writes that the result is "serviceable if somewhat disjointed". She comments that the war photographer Lee Miller almost comes in the second category, alongside the unknown women who contributed to sewing the squares of the Changi quilt.

Christina Lamb in The Times writes that it was "about time" that somebody made a film about how women see war. She admires the Ukrainian Zhanna Kadyrova's work: loaves and slices of bread, fashioned from large round stones (river cobbles), sliced and polished; the wall tiles from bombed-out flats are made into depictions of clothes on hangers; pot plants from wrecked buildings are assembled as a group of "refugees". Lamb writes that "The banal and the ordinary are transformed into something unexpectedly evocative".

The Financial Times states that War Paint – Women at War presented the work of a wide range of "overlooked" female artists, from the Bayeux Tapestry's depiction of violence against women in the Norman Conquest through to the 21st century Russian invasion of Ukraine. The Member of Parliament Louise Jones, on Politics Home, writes that the "powerful" film is brave enough to examine the use of rape in wartime. She remarks the Bayeux Tapestry scene that "hints at ... rape", "snuck into a small part of the border" by a female needleworker, probably an Anglo-Saxon, in 11th century Kent. Jones comments that she missed a mention of the Afghanistan war against the Taliban, in which she took part.
