= 19th International Emmy Awards =

1991 awards ceremony

- Date: November 25, 1991
- Location: Hilton Hotel; New York City, New York, U.S.
- Hosted by: Roger Moore

Television/radio coverage
- Network: A&E
- Produced by: Joseph Cates

The 19th annual International Emmy Awards took place on November 25, 1991, in New York City. The award ceremony was hosted by Roger Moore and presented by the International Academy of Television Arts and Sciences (IATAS). A&E TV network aired the awards on December 28 to more than 20 countries including Italy, Germany, Australia, Spain, Japan and China.

== Judgment ==
This year's entries – 242 from 24 nations – were judged in New York City and Los Angeles by U.S.-based TV executives, distributors, buyers, producers, writers and directors. To ensure that programs are not judged on production values alone, judges are instructed to consider the concept behind a show as well as the execution.

== Ceremony ==
International Emmy nominees were announced by the International Academy of Television Arts and Sciences (IATAS) on November 10, 1991. A total of 18 TV shows were selected to compete for awards in six categories, 14 of which are in English language, including all nominated in the categories of documentary arts, popular arts program and children's program. The United Kingdom accounted for 10 of the 18 nominations. Three Australian programs were nominated, followed by Canada with two nominations, and France, Spain and Germany with one each. In addition to the programming awards, the International Academy honored Henry P. Becton Jr., President and General Manager of the WGBH Foundation, with the Directorate Award and documentary filmmaker Adrian Cowell, with the Founders Award. The award ceremony was produced by Joseph Cates, and broadcast by the Italian web site RAI.

== Winners ==
Best Drama	Best Popular Arts
The Black Velvet Gown - (United Kingdom) (Tyne Tees TV); The World of Eddie Weary - (United Kingdom) (Yorkshire TV); The End of Innocence - (Germany) (WDR/Redaktion Fernsehspiel)	The Curse of Mr. Bean - (United Kingdom) (Thames TV); Whose Line Is It Anyway? - (United Kingdom) (Channel 4); The Kids in the Hall - (Canada) (CBC)
Best Arts Documentary	Best Documentary
Damned in the USA - (United Kingdom) (Channel 4); Naked Hollywood — Funny for Money - (United Kingdom) (BBC); Menuhin: A Family Portrait - (United Kingdom) (Isolde Films)	Cambodia: The Betrayal - (United Kingdom) (Central TV); El caso 112 - (Spain) (TVE); Chasseurs des ténèbres - (France) (Antenne-2/MDI/Nat Geo/Wind Horse)
Best Performing Arts	Best Children & Young People
Le Dortoir - (Canada) (Rhombus Media); Les Huguenots - (Australia) (ABC); The Cunning Little Vixen - (United Kingdom) (BBC)	The Fool of the World and the Flying Ship - (United Kingdom) (Thames TV); Johnson and Friends - (Australia) (ABC); Boy Soldiers - (Australia) (ACTF)
