= Revolution: New Art for a New World =

- Directed by: Margy Kinmonth
- Produced by: Margy Kinmonth; Maureen Murray
- Cinematography: Maxim Tarasjugin; Gennady Nemikh; Patrick Duval
- Edited by: Gordon Mason
- Music by: Edmund Jolliffe
- Production companies: Foxtrot Films; Art Alliance Productions
- Distributed by: Foxtrot Films
- Release date: 2016
- Country: United Kingdom
- Language: English

Revolution: New Art for a New World is a feature documentary written and directed by Margy Kinmonth and produced by Foxtrot Films Ltd and Arts Alliance, starring Matthew Macfadyen (Vladimir Lenin), Tom Hollander (Kazimir Malevich), Eleanor Tomlinson (Lyubov Popova), James Fleet (Wassily Kandinsky) and Daisy Bevan (Varvara Stepanova). The film documents the famous Russian Avant-garde artists that flourished after the October Revolution, only to be later suppressed by Joseph Stalin's regime. The documentary was filmed on location in London, Saint Petersburg and Moscow, with access to The Tretyakov Gallery, The Russian Museum, The Hermitage Museum and in co-operation with The Royal Academy of Arts, London.

Revolution: New Art for a New World was aired on BBC Four in October 2017 as part of the BBC's Russian Season to mark the centenary of the Russian Revolution.

== Credits ==
Contributors

- Dr. Anne Applebaum
- Professor Christina Lodder
- Dr. Natalia Murray
- Evgenia Petrova
- Professor Mikhail Piotrovsky
- Zelfira Tregulova
