= Freddie Fox (actor) =

British actor (born 1989)

- Fox in 2024
- Born: Frederick Samson Robert Morice Fox; 5 April 1989 (age 37); London, England
- Education: Guildhall School of Music and Drama (BA)
- Occupation: Actor
- Years active: 2009–present
- Parents: Edward Fox (father); Joanna David (mother)
- Relatives: Emilia Fox (sister)
- Family: Fox

Frederick Samson Robert Morice Fox (born 5 April 1989) is an English film and stage actor. His prominent screen performances include roles as singer Marilyn in the BBC's Boy George biopic Worried About the Boy (2010), Freddie Baxter in series Cucumber (2015) and Banana (2015), Jeremy Bamber in White House Farm (2020), James "Spider" Webb in Slow Horses (2022–2023), and Gwayne Hightower in House of the Dragon (2024–present).

His theatre credits include starring as Simon Bliss in Hay Fever (2012) at the Noël Coward Theatre; as Oscar Wilde's young lover Lord Alfred "Bosie" Douglas in The Judas Kiss (2012–2013) at the Hampstead Theatre, during a UK tour, and in a West End transfer; as Romeo in Romeo and Juliet (2015) at the Sheffield Crucible and in Kenneth Branagh's 2016 production at the Garrick Theatre; as Tristan Tzara in Travesties (2016–2017) at the Menier Chocolate Factory and Apollo Theatre; as Lord Goring in An Ideal Husband (2018) at the Vaudeville Theatre; and as Edmond Rostand in Edmond de Bergerac (2019) at the Birmingham Repertory Theatre and during a UK tour.

Fox appeared on the big screen in The Three Musketeers (2011), The Riot Club (2014), Pride (2014), Victor Frankenstein (2015), King Arthur: Legend of the Sword (2017) and Black '47 (2018).

== Early life and education ==
Frederick Samson Robert Morice Fox was born on 5 April 1989 in Hammersmith, London. He was raised between London and the family home in Kimmeridge Bay, Dorset, and was surrounded by actors and writers from a young age.

He is the son of actress Joanna David (née Joanna Elizabeth Hacking) and actor Edward Fox. He is the younger brother of actress Emilia Fox and the half-brother of Lucy Arabella Preston (the Viscountess Gormanston), the grandson of actress Angela Worthington Fox and theatrical agent Robin Fox, and the great-grandson of the playwright Frederick Lonsdale. He is the nephew of producer Robert Fox and actor James Fox, and a cousin to Laurence and Jack. He was named after Fred Zinnemann, who directed his father in The Day of the Jackal, and after his great-great-grandfather Victorian industrialist Samson Fox, who invented the corrugated boiler flue and built Harrogate's former Kursaal now known as the Royal Hall. Asked if he believes in his acting gene, he said, "I used not to until my sister Milly was on the BBC's Who Do You Think You Are?" where they discovered the thespian thread goes back 100 years.

From 1994 to 2002, Fox was educated at Arnold House School, a preparatory school for boys in St John's Wood, London, where he was head boy. He was prefect during secondary school at Bryanston School, a boarding school in Dorset where he perfected his elocution and overcame severe dyslexia. During his time there, he portrayed a headmaster in A Risky Business, a play written especially for him by a classics master.

He then attended the Guildhall School of Music and Drama in London and graduated in 2010. His drama teachers praised his talent for acting.

== Career ==
=== Beginnings ===
Fox's first screen appearance was at age seven as an extra in the 1997 TV adaptation of Rebecca. In 2009, he appeared in St Trinian's 2: The Legend of Fritton's Gold as head boy and in Agatha Christie's Marple as Tom Savage. In 2010, he starred as Jamie in the musical The Last Five Years at the Silk Street Theatre and, after a sell-out success, at the Barbican Pit Theatre.

=== 2010–2015: Worried About the Boy, Cucumber, Banana ===
Fox starred in his first breakthrough role as the androgynous 1980s pop star Marilyn in Worried About The Boy based on the life of the singer Boy George. He appeared as Peter Scabius in Any Human Heart and as Guy Wells in Rosamunde Pilcher's Shades of Love. He played cleft-palated Camille Chandebise in A Flea in Her Ear at The Old Vic, Tony Davenport in the stage play revival of Cause Célèbre at The Old Vic, and Ratallack in The Shadow Line.

His international film debut came through his role as King Louis XIII of France in The Three Musketeers (2011). In 2012, he played the title role in The Mystery of Edwin Drood. He appeared in Lewis as Sebastian Dromgoole and in Tom Stoppard's critically acclaimed period drama Parade's End as Edward Wannop. He then played Simon Bliss in Hay Fever at the Noël Coward Theatre and made an early career impact as Oscar Wilde's young lover Lord Alfred "Bosie" Douglas in The Judas Kiss (2012–2013) at the Hampstead Theatre, during a UK tour, and in its West End transfer. Fox voiced Prince Louis of Battenberg in Margy Kinmonth's Royal Paintbox with HRH The Prince of Wales featuring the artworks of the British royal family across centuries. He also starred as Sandy Irvine in Words of Everest.

In Lone Scherfig's The Riot Club (2014) Fox played James Leighton-Masters, the outgoing president of the ten-member elite Oxford University club. Based on Laura Wade's hit play Posh, it tackles class and social structure as a commentary on the Bullingdon Club. He appeared as Jeff Cole in the critically acclaimed historical comedy-drama Pride and starred in Anthony Fabian's Freeze-Frame (2014) commissioned by the Foreign and Commonwealth Office to promote collaboration between China and UK's film industries.

In 2015, he played the breakout 'bisexual nympho' Freddie Baxter in the Channel 4 hit series Cucumber, a role which he reprised in E4's Banana, and appeared as himself in Tofu. Both Cucumber and Banana were nominated for the GLAAD Media Award for Outstanding TV Movie or Limited Series in 2016. i-D said of Fox, "you can't deny he's a connoisseur at picking the parts which have maximum impact." Fox then played the wealthy aristocrat Finnegan, the benefactor of the title character's Prometheus creation in Victor Frankenstein.

=== 2015–2017: Romeo and Juliet, Travesties, Dennis and Gnasher: Unleashed! ===
In June 2016, he was announced as third prize winner at the 2015 Ian Charleson Awards, having played the role of Romeo in Romeo and Juliet (2015) to great acclaim at the Sheffield Crucible. His proficiency with the role led him to be called into service again as Romeo in Kenneth Branagh's 2016 production at the Garrick Theatre on short notice when the preceding Romeo and his understudy were both injured. With just a 2-day rehearsal after he was cast, Fox took over the role on 26 July and performed it until the end of the play's run on 13 August, garnering rave reviews and impressing cast and crew. He then starred in The Northleach Horror as the maverick scientist Whitsuntide and led the cast of A Midsummer Night's Dream at Southwark Playhouse as Nick Bottom / Demetrius.

He performed as poet Tristan Tzara, one of the founders and central figures of the Dada movement, in Tom Stoppard's Travesties from September until November 2016 at the Menier Chocolate Factory, the play being listed in The Arts Desk's Best of 2016: Theatre. The following year, it ran for a West End revival from February to April 2017 at the Apollo Theatre to widespread acclaim. Fox was nominated for the 2017 Laurence Olivier Award for Best Actor in a Supporting Role and the WhatsOnStage Awards for Best Supporting Actor in a Play.

He then voiced Dennis in the animated series Dennis & Gnasher: Unleashed!, in its launch becoming the highest-rated animated show on CBBC for 6 to 12 year olds and one of the top 10 shows for kids across all channels. Its first season received nominations at the 2018 British Animation Awards as Best Children's Series, the 2019 Kidscreen Awards as Best Animated Series, and the 2018 International Emmy Kids Awards in the Animation category. He then appeared as Rubio in King Arthur: Legend of the Sword (2017) directed by Guy Ritchie. Fox played key scenes as Mr. Sloane in Joe Orton Laid Bare, voiced a character/s in Lego Marvel Super Heroes 2, and voiced Corvin in Xenoblade Chronicles 2.

=== 2018–2019: The Ice King, An Ideal Husband, Hero, Edmond de Bergerac, Fanny Lye Deliver'd ===
In February 2018, Fox starred as the British Commander Pope in Black '47, Ireland's first historical film on the Great Famine of 1847. Released in the same month at the CPH:DOX to great acclaim was James Erskine's The Ice King narrated by Fox which profiles the life of John Curry who revolutionised ice skating from a dated sport into an exalted art form and became the first openly gay Olympian. Little White Lies remarks, "Fox affects Curry's distinctive accent with remarkable accuracy." In An Ideal Husband, which ran from May to July 2018 at the Vaudeville Theatre to critical acclaim, Fox starred with his father Edward for the first time playing fictional father and son the Earl of Caversham and Lord Goring. According to Financial Times, Fox "effortlessly delivers that mix of insouciance and gravity" and, for The Telegraph,"embodies the Wildean spirit of modernity".

In the same year was his directorial debut through the short film Hero (2018), which he co-wrote and co-produced, centred on an isolated young boy and a decaying old film star brought together by their shared love of the silver screen. It premiered in August at the Rhode Island International Film Festival where he won the Grand Prize (Short) for Directorial Discovery Award. It was subsequently selected at the Kerry Film Festival and the Linea d'Ombra Film Festival, and released on Amazon UK and ITunes in multiple countries in November 2019.

In 2019, he headlined the English production of Edmond de Bergerac playing the titular role playwright Edmond Rostand at the Birmingham Repertory Theatre before touring the UK to great acclaim. The Guardian raved that as Edmond, Fox is "by turns a jangle of nerves, a lead weight of despondency and a blaze of success." Fox then voiced Captain Holly in Watership Down and played the characters Jokannen, Dorian Gray, and Lord Goring in The Importance of Being Oscar. He starred as Detective Sargeant Wilbur Strauss in the highly rated Victorian comedy Year of the Rabbit, which he described as his "first real comedy show" and "a total lesson in improvised and situational comedy" that he had never had before. He also rendered dramatic performances in "The Class Ceiling" episode of Novels That Shaped Our World. Thomas Clay's Fanny Lye Deliver'd then premiered to positive reviews as a new cult classic set in 1657 Shropshire where Fox played Thomas Ashbury. The Independent said that he "gives Thomas a flash of predatory charisma," and according to The Irish News, "preaches 'perfect libertinism' in captivating sermons".

=== 2020–present: White House Farm, House of the Dragon ===
At the start of 2020, Fox delivered a persuasive performance in his role as the convicted mass murderer Jeremy Bamber in the ITV crime drama White House Farm based on the White House Farm murders in August 1985. In preparation, he created a psychology as convincing and enigmatic as the character should be "to leave the viewer asking questions". The London Evening Standard praised Fox's "ambiguous, wide-eyed look that hovers between angelic and devious, that it's hard to know whether to feel sympathy or suspicion." The Times remarked that he managed to be both "revealing and inscrutable, which can't be easy." The series won as Best New Drama at the 2020 TV Choice Awards leading to its international release on HBO Max in September 2020 and on Netflix in February 2021. Subsequently, he appeared on his co-star Cressida Bonas' podcast Fear Itself, where he expressed his fear of not reaching his full potential.

In the same year, Fox guest-starred as the alcoholic busker Miles Stevens in McDonald & Dodds and as King Hugo of Sweden in Hulu's critically acclaimed comedy-drama series The Great (2020). He reprised his voice-over role as Dennis in the second season of Dennis & Gnasher: Unleashed! from which select episodes were condensed into the film Dennis and Gnasher: Unleashed! On the Big Screen. He then portrayed Margaret Thatcher's son Mark Thatcher in season 4 of the award-winning Netflix historical drama series The Crown (2020).

In 2021, Fox opened The Golden Era of Broadway episode of The Theatre Channel, singing an arrangement of "Willkommen" and "Money" from Cabaret, and starred as Tony Kroesig, a Bullingdon club member and aristocrat banker turned politician, in The Pursuit of Love.

In April 2023, it was announced that Fox had been cast as Ser Gwayne Hightower in the second season of House of the Dragon.

In March 2025, it was announced that Fox had been cast as a villain in the fifteenth series of Doctor Who. That same year, Fox directed his second short film, The Painting and the Statue, co-written with Tanya Reynolds. It was selected for the 2025 HollyShorts Film Festival and won the award for Best International Short.

In 2026, Fox made his musical theater debut as Mike Connor in the High Society West End revival. He also directed and produced Into the Breach, a documentary on British theater which premiered at the 2026 Telluride film festival and stars Kenneth Brannagh as the host.

== Philanthropy ==
Fox is a patron of the St Giles Trust and Future 5 – a campaign by Prostate Cancer Research Centre. He is also an honorary vice president of the Story of Christmas Appeal. In March 2015, he became the face of Live Below The Line.

An avid runner himself, he supported the St James's Place Foundation Triathlon and Duathlon in 2016 which raised £1.3m for Hope and Homes for Children. He was involved with the charity when he visited orphanages in Rwanda in 2015 and in Uganda in 2018 which he wrote about in a two-part blog entry, "Love is Everything—Freddie Fox in Uganda".

He is a frequent supporter and reader at fundraising activities and charity events of The Poetry Hour, Breast Cancer Now, the Brain Tumour Research Campaign, The Story of Christmas Appeal, and The National Brain Appeal among others. In 2020, he participated in a charity reading of Tom Stoppard's The Real Inspector Hound that was produced by Lockdown Theatre in association with The Royal Theatrical Fund. In 2021, he performed with Alfie Boe on a global livestream concert, Alfie Boe & Friends Live at the Savoy "Lockdown Edition", which sold tickets to donate to Hospitality Action and the Connection at St. Martin's.

== Public image ==
Fox was described by The Guardian as "deliciously debonair" and "at age 23, [...] all responsive intelligence and poised charm and is unguarded – as people happy in their own skins often are". "He is almost tyrannically polite and charming," stated The Telegraph, and, "raised in a pack of upper-class thespians, his every utterance comes as a measured, um-less paragraph." He had been described as the latest scion of his acting dynasty. He stated that though his parents' ties may have opened doors to agents, it is "not a masonic back door to every job".

Another Magazine remarked that at the age of 23, Fox "has surprisingly well-formed opinions on men's style." According to The Gentleman's Journal, whose cover he headlined on their Autumn 2014 issue, Fox "continues to impress commentators with his suave, dandy-esque style." He was featured in The Chap's Summer 2018 edition in what the magazine boasts of as their best edition, saying that "no previous issue has so comprehensively gathered so many vital strands of 'anarcho-dandyism.'" Fox launched the opening of White Shirt Week in St James's, London in 2013. His commentary on the role his costume played in The Riot Club was featured in the Financial Times.

He is averse to social media and has said that he is reticent in conversation "so that there's still an element of surprise about where characters come from."

== Personal life ==
Fox dated Tamzin Merchant, his co-star in The Mystery of Edwin Drood, for two years until September 2013. In June 2020, it was reported that he was dating Sex Education star Tanya Reynolds, whom he met in 2016 during production of Fanny Lye Deliver'd. While promoting Cucumber in 2015, Fox stated that he hopes to "fall in love with another person, as opposed to a sex" and expounded in 2020 saying that "being able to say that you have a more rounded experience as a human being, whether it be through sexuality, or whatever, is now perceived as a real advantage".

== Filmography ==
=== Film ===
Key
†	Denotes works that have not yet been released

Year	Title	Role	Notes
2009	St Trinian's 2: The Legend of Fritton's Gold	Head boy	
2011	The Three Musketeers	King Louis XIII	
2013	Royal Paintbox	Prince Louis of Battenberg (voice)	Documentary
2014	The Riot Club	James Leighton-Masters	
2014	Pride	Jeff Cole	
2015	Victor Frankenstein	Finnegan	
2018	Black '47	Commander Pope	
2018	The Ice King	Narrator / John Curry (voice)	Documentary
2017	King Arthur: Legend of the Sword	Rubio	
2019	Fanny Lye Deliver'd	Thomas Ashbury	
2020	Dennis and Gnasher: Unleashed! On the Big Screen	Dennis (voice)	
2022	Eric Ravilious - Drawn to War	Eric Ravilious (voice)	Documentary
2022	Mrs. Harris Goes to Paris	RAF officer	
2023	Coffee Wars	Hans	
2023	Land of Women	James	
2024	The Ministry of Ungentlemanly Warfare	Ian Fleming	

=== Television ===
Year	Title	Role	Notes
2009	Agatha Christie's Marple	Tom Savage	TV film
2010	Worried About the Boy	Marilyn	TV film
2010	Any Human Heart	Peter Scabius	2 episodes
2010	Rosamund Pilcher's Shades of Love	Guy Wells	Episode: "Family Secret"
2011	The Shadow Line	Ratallack	Recurring role
2012	The Mystery of Edwin Drood	Edwin Drood	Miniseries; main role
2012	Lewis	Sebastian Dromgoole	Episode: "Generation of Vipers"
2012	Parade's End	Edward Wannop	
2013	Words of Everest	Sandy Irvine	
2015	Cucumber	Freddie Baxter	Main role
2015	Banana	Freddie Baxter	Main role
2016	Holocaust Memorial Day 2016	Himself (participant)	
2017	Joe Orton Laid Bare	Mr Sloane	
2017	Saturday Mash-Up!	Himself (celebrity guest)	Series 1, episode 7
2017–2021	Dennis & Gnasher: Unleashed!	Dennis the Menace (voice)	Main role
2018	Portrait Artist of the Year	Himself (celebrity sitter)	Season 4, episode 3
2018	Watership Down	Captain Holly (voice)	Miniseries
2019	Year of the Rabbit	Wilbur Strauss	Main role
2019	The Importance of Being Oscar	Various (Jokannen, Lord Goring, Dorian Gray)	
2019	Novels That Shaped Our World	(Actor)	Series 1, episode: "The Class Ceiling"
2020	White House Farm	Jeremy Bamber	Main role
2020	McDonald & Dodds	Miles Stevens	Series 1, episode 2
2020	The Crown	Mark Thatcher	Series 4, 2 episodes
2020–2023	The Great	King Hugo	Guest (season 1); recurring (season 2); main (season 3)
2021	The Pursuit of Love	Tony Kroesig	Miniseries
2022	Toast of Tinseltown	Edward Fox	Cameo
2022–2023	Slow Horses	Spider Webb	Recurring role
2022–2024	The Heroic Quest of the Valiant Prince Ivandoe	Bert (voice)	Main role
2023	Lot No. 249	Edward Bellingham	Television film
2024	The Gentlemen	Max Bassington	1 episode
2024–present	House of the Dragon	Gwayne Hightower	Main role (season 2–present)
2025	Doctor Who	Kid	Episode: "The Interstellar Song Contest"
2025	The Sandman	Loki	2 episodes
2026	Youth	Grayson	Recurring role

=== Theatre ===
Year	Title	Role	Director	Playwright	Theatre
2010	The Last Five Years: The Musical	Jamie	Christian Burgess	Jason Robert Brown	The Pit, Barbican Centre
2011	A Flea in Her Ear	Camille Chandebise	Richard Eyre	Georges Feydeau	The Old Vic
2011	Cause Célèbre	Tony Davenport	Thea Sharrock	Terence Rattigan	The Old Vic
2012	Hay Fever	Simon Bliss	Howard Davies	Noël Coward	Noël Coward Theatre
2012–2013	The Judas Kiss	Lord Alfred "Bosie" Douglas	Neil Armfield	David Hare	Hampstead Theatre; UK tour Duke of York's Theatre
2015	Romeo and Juliet	Romeo Montague	Jonathan Humphreys	William Shakespeare	Crucible Theatre
2016	A Midsummer Night's Dream	Nick Bottom / Demetrius	Simon Evans	William Shakespeare	Southwark Playhouse
2016	Romeo and Juliet	Romeo Montague (replacement)	Kenneth Branagh	William Shakespeare	Garrick Theatre
2016–2017	Travesties	Tristan Tzara	Patrick Marber	Tom Stoppard	Menier Chocolate Factory; Apollo Theatre
2018	An Ideal Husband	Lord Goring	Jonathan Church	Oscar Wilde	Vaudeville Theatre
2019	Edmond de Bergerac	Edmond Rostand	Roxana Silbert	Alexis Michalik	Birmingham Repertory Theatre UK tour
2022	Hamlet	Prince Hamlet	Tom Littler	William Shakespeare	Guildford Shakespeare Company
2023-2024	She Stoops to Conquer	Charles Marlow	Tom Littler	Oliver Goldsmith	Orange Tree Theatre
2026	High Society	Mike Connor	Rachel Kavanaugh	Cole Porter and Arthur Kopit	Barbican Centre UK tour

=== Web ===
Year	Title	Role	Notes
2015	Tofu	Himself	Documentary
2021	The Theatre Channel	Himself	Episode 5: "The Golden Era of Broadway"

=== Filmmaking ===
Year	Title	Credited as			Notes	Distributor
Year	Title	Director	Writer	Producer	Notes	Distributor
2018	Hero	Yes	Yes	Yes	Short film	Shorts International, Ziggo Movies & Series XL
2025	The Painting and the Statue	Yes	Yes	No	Short film	
2026	Into the Breach	Yes	No	Yes	Documentary	

=== Concert performance ===
Year	Title	Role	Date	Venue
2019	Britten-Shostakovich Festival Orchestra on Tour	Narrator, Prince Hamlet, Romeo	18 Sep	Theatre Royal and Royal Concert Hall, Nottingham
2019	Britten-Shostakovich Festival Orchestra on Tour	Narrator, Prince Hamlet, Romeo	25 Sep	Cardogan Hall, London
2021	Alfie Boe & Friends Live at the Savoy 'Lockdown Edition	Himself	10 April	The Savoy, London
2021	Alfie Boe Live 2021	Himself	4 Sep	Harewood House, Leeds
2021	Trentham Live	Himself	5 Sep	Trentham Estate, Stoke-on-Trent

=== Video games ===
Year	Title	Role	Voice director	Game studio
2017	Lego Marvel Super Heroes 2	(Voice)	Adam Chapman and Jimmy Livingstone	Traveller's Tales
2017	Xenoblade Chronicles 2	Corvin	Jimmy Livingstone & Matt Roberts	Monolith Soft

== Radio and audio ==
Since 2010, Freddie Fox has voiced characters in numerous radio productions of the BBC.

Title	Role	Writer	Broadcast	Date
Once Upon A Time	Billy	Amanda Whittington	BBC Radio 4	Apr 2010
Life and Fate	Seryozha Shaposhnikov	Vasily Grossman	BBC Radio 4	Sep 2011
Life and Fate	Seryozha Shaposhnikov	Vasily Grossman	BBC Radio 4 Extra	Dec 2019
Cause Celebre: Radio Play	Tony Davenport	Terence Rattigan	BBC Radio 4	Jun 2011
A Midsummer Night's Dream	Puck/Robin Goodfellow	William Shakespeare	BBC Radio 3	Sep 2011, May 2012, Jun 2018
Dead End	Hugo	John Godber	BBC Radio 4	Dec 2012
Present Laughter	Roland Maule	Noël Coward	BBC Radio 4	Apr 2013, Jan 2015
Present Laughter	Roland Maule	Noël Coward	BBC Radio 4 Extra	Oct 2017
Home Front	Freddie Graham	Various writers	BBC Radio 4	Aug 2014 – present
The Knights of the Apocalypse	Sir Guy of Gisburne	Richard Carpenter	ITV	May 2016
As Innocent As You Can Get	Nathaniel	Rex Obano	BBC Radio 3	Feb 2016
Boswell's Life of Byron	Lord Byron	Jon Canter	BBC Radio 4	Mar 2018
The Cherry Orchard, Three Sisters, The Seagull	Ensemble Cast	Anton Chekhov	Audible.com	May 2018
The Quanderhorn Xperimentations	Troy Quanderhorn	Andrew Marshall and Rob Grant	BBC Radio 4	Jun 2018
King of Sherwood	Sir Guy of Gisburne	Paul Birch & Barnaby Eaton-Jones	Spiteful Puppet	Dec 2018
The Trial of John Little	Sir Guy of Gisburne	Richard Carpenter	Spiteful Puppet	Dec 2018
What Was Lost (Part I&II)	Sir Guy of Gisburne	Iain Meadows	Spiteful Puppet	Dec 2018
Quanderhorn 2	Troy Quanderhorn	Andrew Marshall and Rob Grant	BBC Radio 4 Extra	Apr–June 2020
The Rival	Earl of Southampton	Jude Cook	BBC Radio 3	Jun 2021
Mr Waring of the BBC	Mr. Waring	Freddie Phillips	BBC Radio 4	Jun 2021
Nuremberg	Airey Neave	Jonathan Myerson	BBC Radio 4, BBC Sounds	Aug 2021

== Awards and nominations ==
Year	Association	Category	Work	Result
2015	Ian Charleson Awards	Third Prize	Romeo and Juliet (Sheffield Crucible)	Won
2017	Laurence Olivier Awards	Best Actor in a Supporting Role	Travesties (Apollo Theatre)	Nominated
2017	WhatsOnStage Awards	Best Supporting Actor in a Play	Travesties (Apollo Theatre)	Nominated
2018	Rhode Island International Film Festival	Directorial Discovery Award Grand Prize (Short)	Hero (2018)	Won
