= Edmond de Bergerac =

- Written by: Alexis Michalik
- Original language: French
- Subject: The creation of Cyrano de Bergerac by Edmond Rostand
- Genre: Romance, Comedy
- Setting: Paris, 1897

Premiere
- Date premiered: September 2016

Edmond de Bergerac is a French comedy play by Alexis Michalik. Inspired by Shakespeare in Love, the play is set in December 1897 and is about the playwright Edmond Rostand and the creation of his renowned play Cyrano de Bergerac.

== Productions ==
The play opened in September 2016 at the Théâtre du Palais-Royal in Paris where it is currently running (where it is simply titled Edmond). It won 5 Moliere Awards in 2017.

An English translation by Jeremy Sams opened at the Birmingham Repertory Theatre in March 2019 before touring the UK. The production stars Freddie Fox as Edmond, Henry Goodman as Coquelin, Josie Lawrence as Sarah Bernhardt and Chizzy Akudolu as Maria.
