= Looking for Lowry with Ian McKellen =

2011 film

- Directed by: Margy Kinmonth
- Country of origin: United Kingdom
- Original language: English

Production
- Producers: Margy Kinmonth; Maureen Murray
- Production companies: Foxtrot Films Ltd; ITV

Original release
- Network: ITV
- Release: 24 April 2011

Looking for Lowry with Ian McKellen is a documentary film about the British artist L. S. Lowry and his work. The film is written and directed by Margy Kinmonth and produced by Foxtrot Films Ltd and features Ian McKellen (L. S. Lowry), Noel Gallagher and Dame Paula Rego. Visiting the Tate Modern store to view its Lowry collection the documentary asks why, despite his popular appeal, the Tate does not have any of its 23 Lowrys on show to the public. Lowry’s heiress Carol Lowry (no relation) appears for the first time on film, describing her 19 year friendship with Uncle Laurie. When Lowry died, he left everything to her in his will; the film features her own personal archive which was found in Lowry’s house.

The film sparked controversy. Tate Britain came under fire in the press for not displaying any of its collection of works by L.S. Lowry. The museum subsequently held a major exhibition of Lowry’s landscapes in 2013 entitled "Lowry and the Painting of Modern Life".

The film was the first of ITV’s Perspectives strand on Sunday 24 April 2011.

== Credits ==
Contributors

- Ian McKellen
- Carol Ann Lowry
- Noel Gallagher
- Dame Paula Rego
- Gillian Lynne
- Jeffrey Archer
- Ben Timperley
- Andrew Kalman
- Robin Light
- Edwin Mullins
- Jonathon Horwich
- Peter Wroe
- Pam Heywood
- Chris Stephens
- Prof. Michael Fitzgerald
- Darren Goldsmith
- Martha Leebolt
- Helena Clark-Maxwell
- Sally Kalman
