= Royal Paintbox =

- Film poster
- Directed by: Margy Kinmonth
- Produced by: Margy Kinmonth; Maureen Murray
- Edited by: Gordon Mason
- Music by: Edmund Jolliffe
- Production company: Foxtrot Films
- Distributed by: Foxtrot Films
- Release date: 2013
- Country: United Kingdom
- Language: English

Royal Paintbox is a documentary film directed by Margy Kinmonth that follows Charles, Prince of Wales, as he reveals the rare and prolific art work of his forebears, many of whom were accomplished amateur artists, and traces his family's love of painting through the generations. Shot in Balmoral Castle, Highgrove House, Eastcote, Windsor Castle, Frogmore House & Osborne House, Royal Paintbox features art by members of the British royal family down the centuries including some of Charles, Prince of Wales's own watercolours and artist Sarah Armstrong-Jones.

== Credits ==
Contributors

- Lady Antonia Fraser
- Jane, Lady Roberts
- Charles Saumarez Smith
- Marina Warner
- Jane Ridley
- Catherine Goodman
- Susannah Fiennes
- Warwick Fuller
- Countess Mountbatten of Burma
