= Fanny Lye Deliver'd =

- Directed by: Thomas Clay
- Written by: Thomas Clay
- Produced by: Michel Merkt
- Starring: Maxine Peake; Charles Dance; Freddie Fox
- Cinematography: Giorgos Arvanitis
- Music by: Thomas Clay
- Distributed by: Vertigo Releasing
- Release date: 10 October 2019 (London Film Festival)
- Running time: 111 minutes
- Country: United Kingdom

Fanny Lye Deliver'd is a British horror-melodrama period piece film set in 1657 on a Shropshire farm. It stars Maxine Peake, Charles Dance, and Freddie Fox, and is written and directed by Thomas Clay. It premiered in October 2019 after more than three years in post production. The film has an alternate title called The Delivered on IMDB.

== Premise ==
John and Fanny Lye, along with their son Arthur, live in a small rural farm in Shropshire during Oliver Cromwell's reign. John is authoritarian, puritan, and abusive, and represents old oppressive traditional values. One day, Thomas and Rebecca were found on their farm, naked and bruised, claiming that they were robbed and seek shelter. John reluctantly allowed them to stay. The two visitors are revealed to hold nontraditional values and starts influencing Fanny to indulge. However, the Thomas' proposed values of sexual and moral freedom are also not as honest as it seems. Also, the sheriff and constable came looking for Thomas and Rebecca, claiming they are dangerous heretics, but are perhaps just as dishonest as Thomas.

== Cast ==
- Maxine Peake as Fanny Lye
- Charles Dance as John Lye
- Freddie Fox as Thomas Ashbury
- Tanya Reynolds as Rebecca Henshaw
- Peter McDonald as The High Sheriff for the Council of State
- Zak Adams as Arthur Lye
- Perry Fitzpatrick as The Sheriff's Deputy
- Kenneth Collard as The Constable

== Reception ==
The film has a positive critics review on sites like Rotten Tomatoes, though mediocre audience review. Critics review were generally positive, citing the solid performance from the lead actors and symbolic tension between old versus new ideas in that setting, but noting the plot can be somewhat predictable.
