= Eric Ravilious: Drawn to War =

Documentary about a war artist

- Directed by: Margy Kinmonth
- Written by: Margy Kinmonth
- Produced by: Margy Kinmonth; Maureen Murray
- Edited by: Gordon Mason
- Music by: Edmund Jolliffe
- Production company: Foxtrot Films Ltd
- Distributed by: Dartmouth Films
- Release date: 1 July 2022
- Country: United Kingdom
- Language: English

Eric Ravilious: Drawn to War is a 2022 British film written and directed by Margy Kinmonth. It is the first feature film to be made about the English war artist Eric Ravilious. It features the voices of Freddie Fox, Tamsin Greig, Jeremy Irons and Harriet Walter and includes contributions from Ai Weiwei, Grayson Perry, Alan Bennett and Robert Macfarlane.

== Production ==
Eric Ravilious: Drawn to War was filmed on location in UK, Ireland and Portugal.

== Cast ==
- Freddie Fox
- Tamsin Greig
- Neville Watchurst
- Harriet Walter
- Jeremy Irons
- Samuel West

== Release ==
Eric Ravilious: Drawn to War, a Margy Kinmonth film, opened across the UK and Ireland on July 1, 2022, released by Dartmouth Films.

== Reception ==
Rachel Campbell-Johnston of The Times praised the film: "Ravishing Ravilious; a visionary who celebrated England in war and peace..."

Richard Brooks in The Observer called the film's general release in cinemas "a rarity for an art film".

Tom Robey of The Telegraph rated the film four out of five stars, commenting "Modest in its approach, this filmic portrait takes shape as both biography and love story."

== Awards ==
Nominated, The Master of Art Film Festival (2022).
