= Christina Gibb =

New Zealand peace activist (1929–2018)

- Born: Christina Godfrey; 6 August 1929; Sevenoaks, Kent, England
- Died: 18 March 2018 (aged 88); Dunedin, New Zealand
- Citizenship: New Zealander
- Education: University of Oxford
- Occupations: Schoolteacher; Rape crisis counsellor
- Known for: Peace activism and environmentalism
- Spouse: John Gibb (m. 1950; div. 1977)
- Children: 2
- Relatives: John Henry Godfrey (father); Kathleen Godfrey (sister); Neville Chamberlain (great-uncle)

Christina Gibb (née Godfrey; 6 August 1929 – 18 March 2018) was a New Zealand peace activist and environmental advocate.

== Biography ==
Gibb was born Christina Godfrey on 6 August 1929 in Sevenoaks, Kent, England, the third daughter of British naval intelligence officer (and "M" prototype) John Henry Godfrey and Margaret Godfrey (née Hope). She was educated at Downe House School, the Sorbonne (Paris) and the University of Oxford, graduating with a Master of Arts degree in crystallography. At Oxford, she met ornithologist and ecologist John Gibb. They married in 1950 and had two children, emigrating to New Zealand in 1957, where she worked as a high-school teacher and studied for the Anglican priesthood, despite being ineligible at the time due to her gender. Instead, she became a parish worker and then warden of an ecumenical retreat centre. Later, when women became eligible for the priesthood in New Zealand, she was rejected because she had separated from her husband. They divorced in 1977.

Gibb became a naturalised New Zealand citizen in 1980. Gibb spent years restoring an area of native bush on her property in the Dunedin suburb of Ravensbourne, placing a Queen Elizabeth II National Trust covenant on the forest. She was a proponent, and ultimately an adherent, of natural burial. She died in Dunedin on 18 March 2018, aged 88.

== Activism ==
After moving to Dunedin in 1982, Gibb became a rape crisis counsellor and social housing advocate. She travelled to Hong Kong in 1991 to volunteer at a detention centre for Vietnamese boat people seeking asylum there. She became a supporter of David Bain following his conviction for murder.

In March 2004, Gibb and Dunedin mayor Sukhi Turner led a rally opposing the 2003 invasion of Iraq.

In 2004, Gibb travelled to Hebron and worked with people from Israeli, Palestinian and international peace and human rights organisations as part of the Christian Peacemaker Teams. From 2004 to 2006, she wrote articles for the Otago Daily Times newspaper's weekly World Focus supplement, describing her work in Hebron.

=== Arrest ===
On 4 November 2004, Gibb (then aged 75) and fellow Christian Peacemaker Team member Joe Carr (22) were arrested and detained by Israeli police for eight hours on suspicion of terrorism. The pair had been observing the activities of Israeli Defence Force soldiers at the Beit Romano checkpoint in Hebron.
