= To the Western World =

1981 film directed by Margy Kinmonth

- Directed by: Margy Kinmonth
- Produced by: Margy Kinmonth; Brian Harding
- Edited by: John Fanner
- Production companies: Foxtrot Films; ITV
- Release date: 1981
- Country: United Kingdom
- Language: English

To the Western World is a 1981 documentary film directed by Margy Kinmonth. Narrated by John Huston and starring Niall Tóibín, Patrick Laffan, Tom Hickey (actor) & Brendan Cauldwell, the film charts the journey of playwright JM Synge and artist JB Yeats through Connemara in 1905.

The two men were sent by the Manchester Guardian to report on the 'Congested Districts', the most poverty-stricken and over populated parts of the West of Ireland. The film is the first dramatisation of the original articles, which disappeared for decades after their publication. On their journey they described the economic conditions, poverty, unemployment, dress and livestock.

The film has previously won the European Community Award and was nominated for the Fiction Award at the Cork Film Festival.

== Screenings ==
2009 Irish Film Institute and Dublin Theatre Festival’s “Unsung Synge”
