= The Nutcracker Story =

- Directed by: Margy Kinmonth
- Produced by: Margy Kinmonth; Maureen Murray
- Cinematography: Patrick Duval
- Edited by: Jane Greenwood
- Production companies: Foxtrot Films; ITV; Channel 4 International
- Distributed by: Foxtrot Films
- Release date: 2007
- Country: United Kingdom
- Language: English

The Nutcracker Story is a documentary film made for The South Bank Show, written and directed by Margy Kinmonth and produced by Foxtrot Films Ltd in association with ITV productions and Channel 4 International. The film explores the cultural phenomenon that is the famous Tchaikovsky's ballet The Nutcracker, from its genesis through to the present day.

== Credits ==
Contributors

- Ken Russell
- Marina Warner
- Valery Gergiev
- Anthony Holden
- Andrei Konchalovsky
- Peter Schaufuss
- Laura Morera
- Yohei Sasaki
- Peter Wright
- Gabriela Komleva
- Matthew Bourne
- David Nixon
- Elle Fanning
- Gerald Scarfe
- Nathan Lane
- Leonid Sarafanov
- Nadezhda Gonchar
