= The Secret World of Haute Couture =

The Secret Life of Haute Couture
- Directed by: Margy Kinmonth
- Produced by: Margy Kinmonth
- Cinematography: Patrick Duvall
- Edited by: Guy Crossman
- Production company: BBC
- Release date: 2007
- Country: United Kingdom
- Language: English

The Secret Life of Haute Couture is a TV documentary directed by Margy Kinmonth which follows her journey from Paris to New York City and California where she meets some of Haute couture clientele and the world-famous designers involved. The film was first aired on BBC Two in 2007
