= Kathleen Godfrey =

British air force officer (1922–2015)

Kathleen Margaret Godfrey (married names Kinmonth and Warren; 30 October 1922 – 19 October 2015) was a British Women's Auxiliary Air Force officer who served in two highly secretive roles during the Second World War. She worked firstly as a radio operator for radar at Ventnor on the Isle of Wight, and secondly at Hut 3 of Bletchley Park working to extract intelligence from cracked Enigma ciphers.

== Family ==
Her father was John Henry Godfrey, a Royal Navy officer on whom Ian Fleming is said to have based James Bond's boss "M". Godfrey kept her war work secret from her father, even though he was the Director of Naval Intelligence. Her mother was Bertha Margaret Godfrey (née Hope), one of the first women to go to Cambridge University and Prime Minister Neville Chamberlain's niece. Kathleen's younger sister Christina Gibb was a peace activist in New Zealand.
