= John Henry Godfrey =

Royal Navy Admiral (1888–1971)

Admiral John Henry Godfrey CB
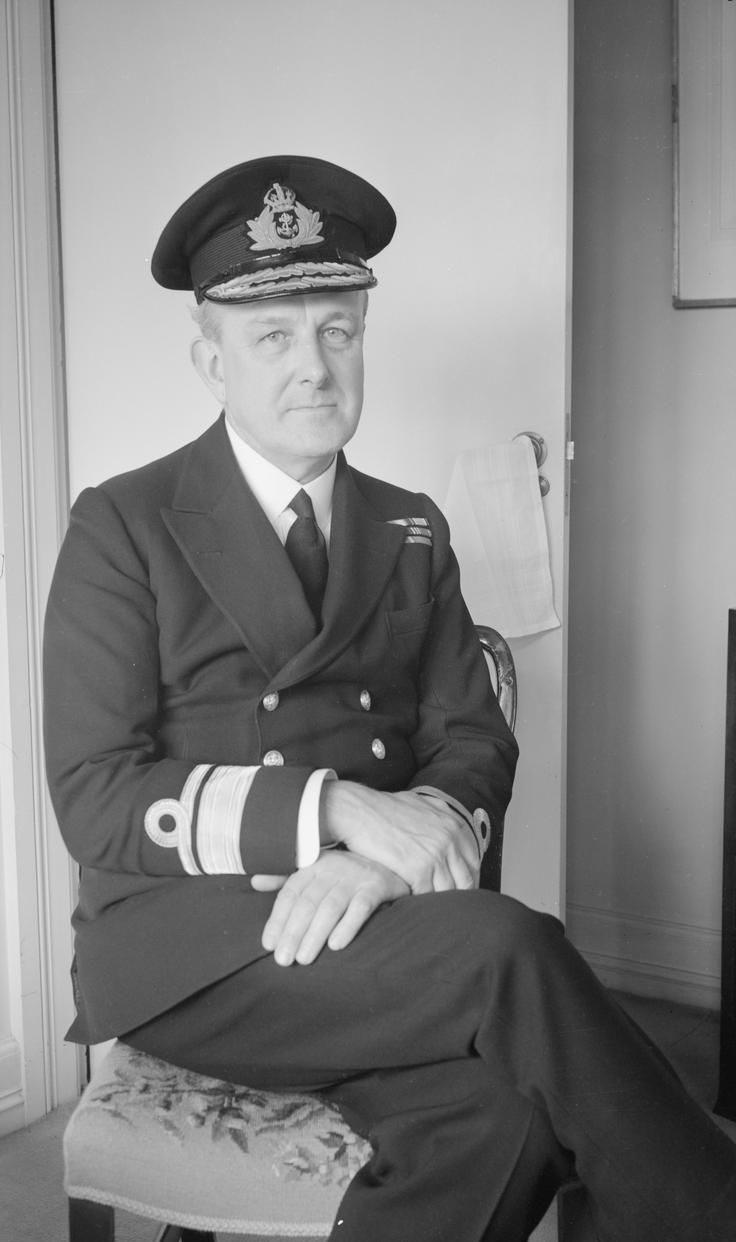
- Rear-Admiral Godfrey during World War II
- Born: 10 July 1888; Handsworth
- Died: 29 August 1971 (aged 83); Eastbourne
- Military career
- Allegiance: United Kingdom; British India
- Branch: Royal Navy; Royal Indian Navy
- Rank: Admiral
- Commands: HMS Kent; HMS Suffolk; HMS Repulse; Royal Indian Navy
- Conflicts: First World War; Second World War
- Awards: Companion of the Order of the Bath

Admiral John Henry Godfrey CB (10 July 1888 – 29 August 1971) was an officer of the Royal Navy and Royal Indian Navy, specialising in navigation. Ian Fleming is said to have based James Bond's boss, "M", on Godfrey.

== Life and career ==
Godfrey was born in Handsworth, Staffordshire, in 1888. The son of Godfrey Henry Godfrey, he was educated at King Edward's School, Birmingham, at Bradfield College and HMS Britannia. In 1921 he married (Bertha) Margaret Hope, (1901–1995), who had studied at Girton College, Cambridge, and was the daughter of Donald Hope, managing director of Henry Hope & Sons Ltd, window-frame manufacturers, of Birmingham. The couple had three daughters, the eldest, Kathleen Margaret Godfrey (1922–2015) (married names Kinmonth, then Warren), became a Women's Auxiliary Air Force officer and a Bletchley Park code breaker; another daughter, Christina Gibb was a peace activist in New Zealand. Margaret Godfrey was very active and supportive of her husband's career, assisting the establishment of the Bletchley Park at the end of 1939, compiling maps and data for the Admiralty from 1940, and was head of the Indian Women's Voluntary Service during the time they were stationed there.

During the First World War, Godfrey served on HMS Euryalus in the Dardanelles Campaign in 1915, and was present at the re-occupation of Sollum, during the bombardment of Smyrna, and in the Red Sea operations in support of the Arab forces. From 1916 to 1919 he was on the staff of the Commander-in-Chief in the Mediterranean, and then from 1921 to 1931, he was Deputy Director at the Royal Naval Staff College.

From 1931 to 1933 he commanded the ships HMS Kent and HMS Suffolk on the China Station, before serving as Deputy Director, Plans Division at the Admiralty from 1933 to 1935. He commanded the battle-cruiser HMS Repulse from 1936 to 1939, then served as Director of Naval Intelligence from 1939 to 1942. From 1943 to 1946 he was Flag Officer Commanding Royal Indian Navy. He was commanding the Royal Indian Navy during the Royal Indian Navy mutiny and went on air with his order to "Submit or perish".

Godfrey was made Captain in 1928, Rear-Admiral in 1939, Vice-Admiral in 1942 and Admiral on the retired list in 1945. As well as being made a Companion of the Order of the Bath in 1939, he was also awarded the Order of the Nile of Egypt and made a Chevalier of the French Legion d'Honneur.

After his retirement, Godfrey was Chairman of the Chelsea Hospital Management Committee from 1949 to 1960, and was a member of the Board of Governors of Queen Charlotte's Hospital and the Chelsea Hospital for Women, and of the Council of King Edward's Hospital Fund for London and Roedean School. He founded the Centre for Spastic Children, Chelsea. Ian Fleming—who served under Godfrey in Naval Intelligence during World War II—based M, the fictional head of MI6 and James Bond's superior, on him; Godfrey complained that Fleming "turned me into that unsavoury character, M".

In 1966 and 1967 Godfrey gave his memoirs to Churchill College, Cambridge. These contain many unpublished sources and are based in part on an official history of the Naval Intelligence Division which he had written at the end of the war. Godfrey died in Eastbourne in 1971.

Military offices
Preceded by James Troup	Director of Naval Intelligence; 1939–1942	Succeeded by Edmund Rushbrooke
Preceded by Sir Herbert Fitzherbert	Flag Officer Commanding Royal Indian Navy; 1943–1946	Succeeded by Sir Geoffrey Miles
