= Thierry Morel =

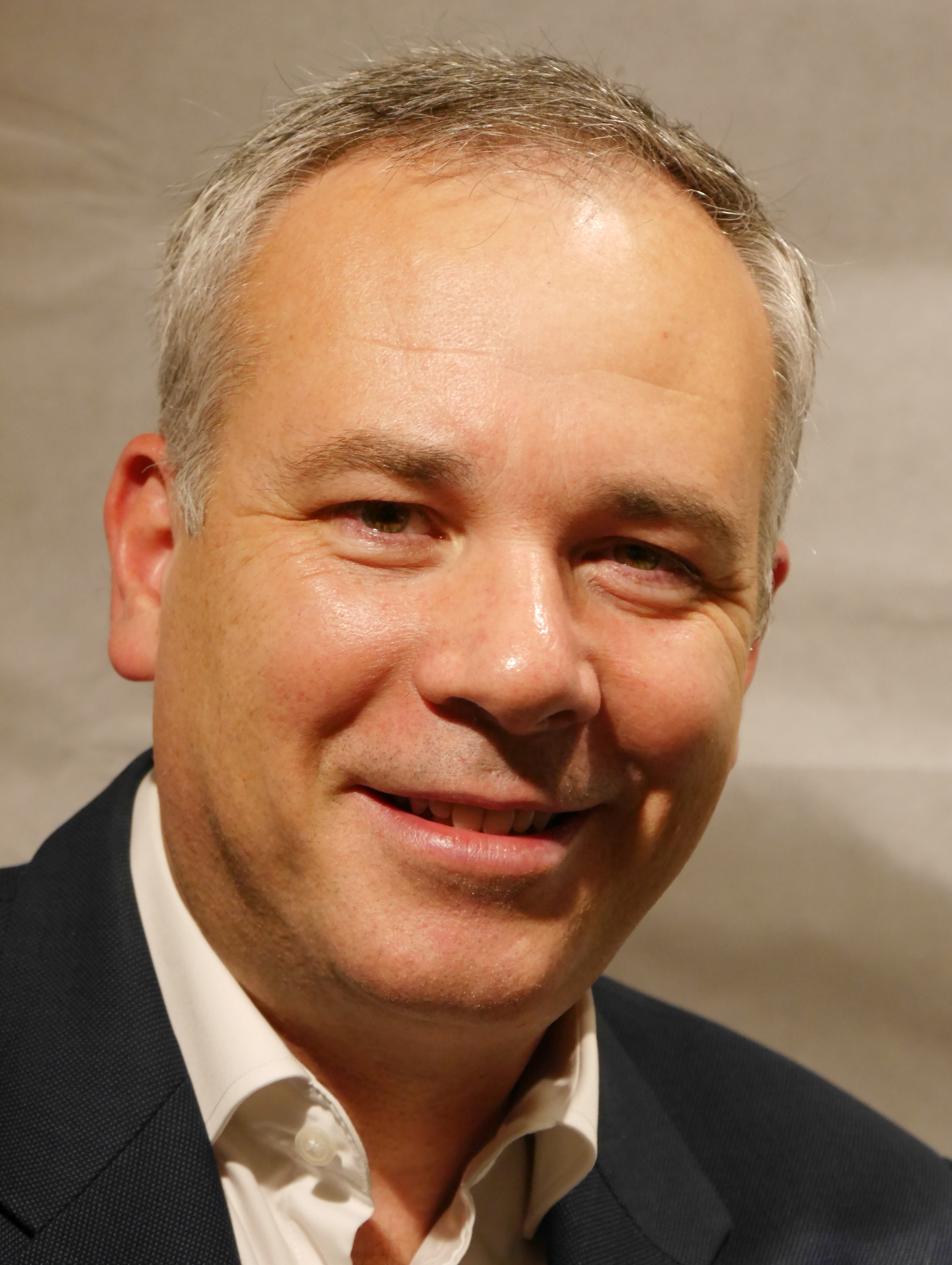
Morel in 2019

Thierry Morel is a French art historian and curator. He is the director and curator-at-large of the Hermitage Museum Foundation.

Morel was educated at the University of Paris and the University of Oxford, where he was a Rhodes Scholar, earned a degree in Law and History of Art. He did post-doctoral research at the University of Cambridge.

He curated Houghton Revisited, which won Apollo magazine's 'Exhibition of the Year' award in 2013.

Morel has written and produced plays and films, including a ten-part television documentary series on art collectors, Private View. He has written for magazines including Apollo.

== Publications ==
- Houghton Revisited: The Walpole Masterpieces from Catherine the Great's Hermitage, 2013
- Francis Bacon and the Masters: Fontanka, 2015
- The Splendor of St. Petersburg: Art & Life in Late Imperial Palaces of Russia, 2019
