= Eric Ravilious =

English painter

- Born: Eric William Ravilious; 22 June 1903; Acton, London, England
- Died: 2 September 1942 (aged 39); Iceland
- Education: Eastbourne Grammar School; Eastbourne School of Art; Royal College of Art
- Known for: Watercolour painting, design, woodcuts
- Spouse: Tirzah Garwood

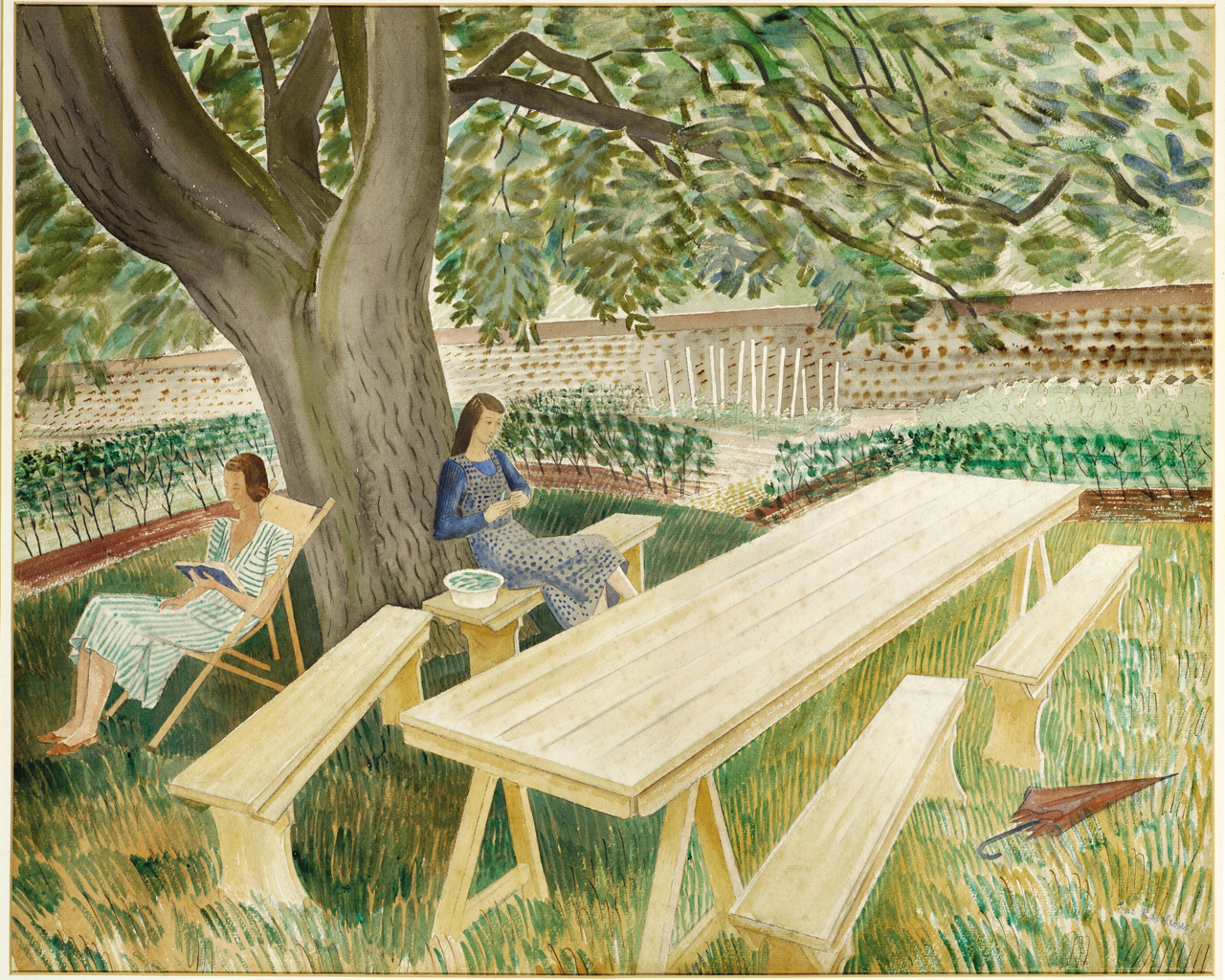
Two Women in a Garden (Ravilious). Tirzah Garwood on right

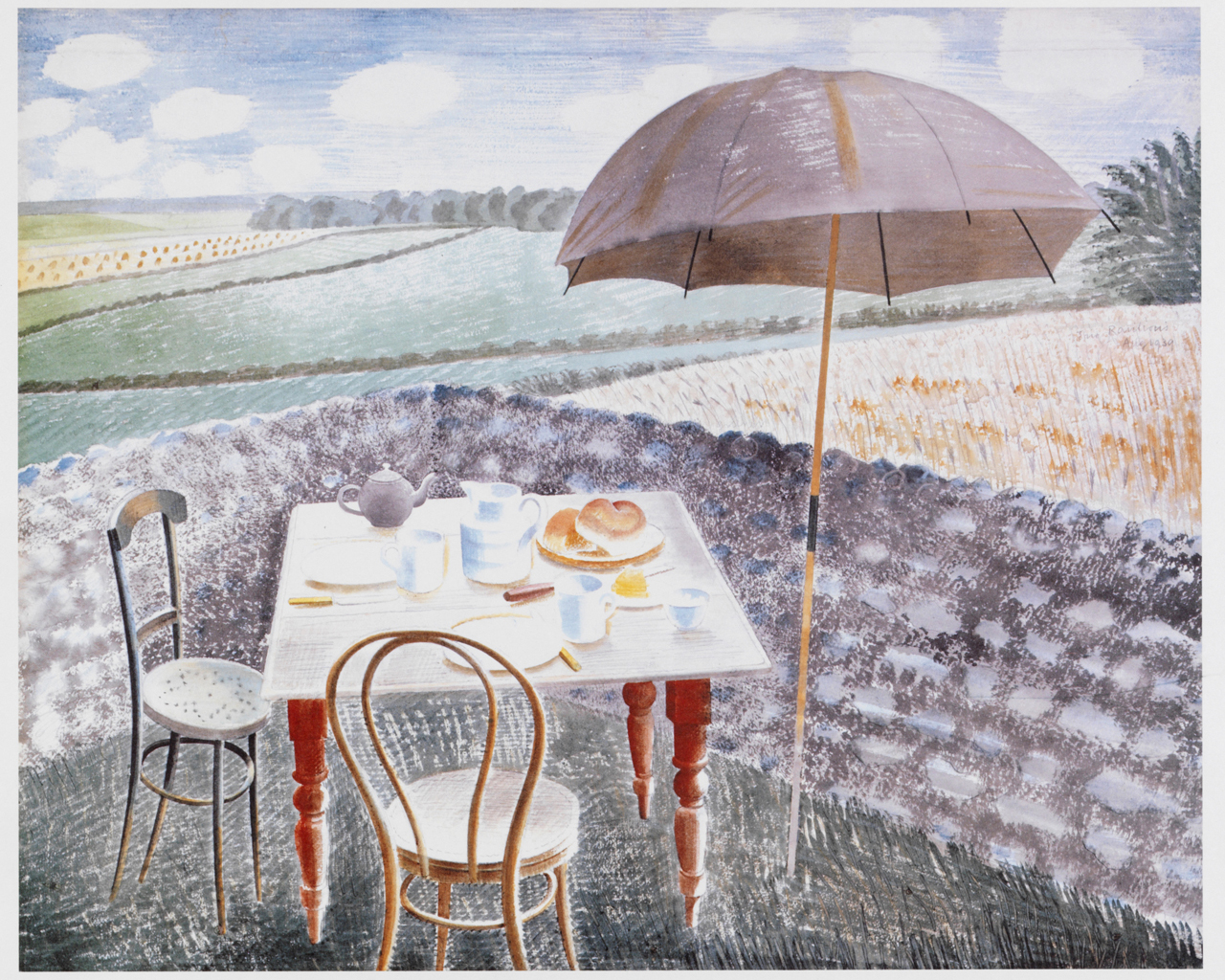
Tea at Furlongs, watercolour 1939

Eric William Ravilious (22 July 1903 – 2 September 1942) was a British painter, designer, book illustrator and wood-engraver. He grew up in Sussex, and is particularly known for his watercolours of the South Downs, Castle Hedingham and other English landscapes, which examine English landscape and vernacular art with an off-kilter, modernist sensibility and clarity.

He served as a war artist, and was the first British war artist to die on active service in World War II when the aircraft he was in was lost off Iceland.

== Early life and education ==
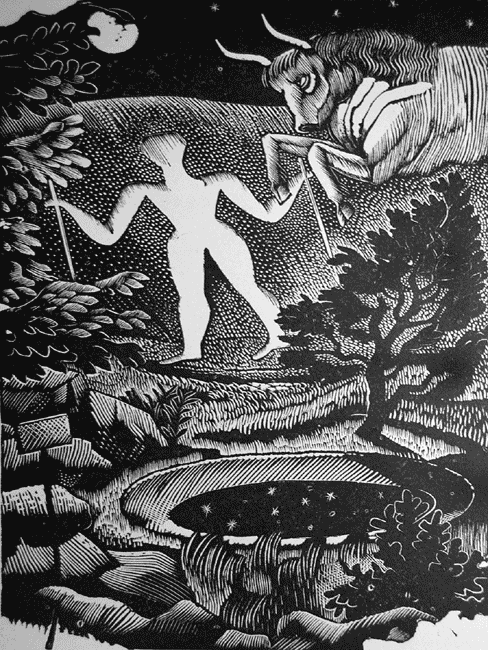
May, woodcut of the Long Man of Wilmington by Eric Ravilious, 1925

Eric William Ravilious was born on 22 July 1903 in Churchfield Road, Acton, west London, the son of Emma (née Ford) and Frank Ravilious. When he was young the family moved to Eastbourne in Sussex, where his parents ran an antiques shop.

Ravilious was educated at Eastbourne Municipal Secondary School for Boys, from September 1914 to December 1919. In 1919 he won a scholarship to Eastbourne School of Art and in 1922 another to study at the Design School at the Royal College of Art. There, he became a close friend of Edward Bawden (his 1930 painting of Bawden at work is in the collection of the college) and, from 1924, studied under Paul Nash. Nash, an enthusiast for wood-engraving, encouraged him in the technique, and was impressed enough by his work to propose him for membership of the Society of Wood Engravers in 1925, and helped him to get commissions. In 1925 Ravilious received a travelling scholarship to Italy and visited Florence, Siena, and the hill towns of Tuscany.

== Career and marriage ==
Following this he began teaching part-time at the Eastbourne School of Art, and from 1930 taught (also part-time) at the Royal College of Art. In the same year he married Eileen Lucy "Tirzah" Garwood, also an artist and engraver, whom he met whilst her tutor at Eastbourne College of Art. They had three children: John Ravilious (1935–2014); the photographer James Ravilious (1939–1999); and Anne Ullmann, née Ravilious (b. 1941), editor of books on her parents and their work.

In 1928, Ravilious, Bawden and Charles Mahoney painted a series of murals at Morley College in south London on which they worked for a whole year. Their work was described by J. M. Richards as "sharp in detail, clean in colour, with an odd humour in their marionette-like figures" and "a striking departure from the conventions of mural painting at that time", but was destroyed by bombing in 1941.

Between 1930 and 1932 Ravilious and Garwood lived in Hammersmith, west London, where there is a blue plaque on the wall of their house at the corner of Upper Mall and Weltje Road. The building looks out onto The Boat Race course, and the couple held bathing and boat-race parties. When Ravilious and Bawden graduated from the RCA they began exploring the Essex countryside in search of rural subjects to paint. Bawden rented Brick House in Great Bardfield as a base and when he married Charlotte Epton, a fellow RCA art student, his father bought it for him as a wedding present. Ravilious and Garwood lodged in Brick House with the Bawdens until 1934 when they purchased Bank House at Castle Hedingham, which is now also marked by a blue plaque. There were eventually several other Great Bardfield Artists.

In 1933, Ravilious and Garwood painted murals at the Midland Hotel in Morecambe. In November 1933, Ravilious held his first solo exhibition at the Zwemmer Gallery in London, titled "An Exhibition of Water-Colour Drawings". Twenty of the 37 works displayed were sold. During 1939, Ravilious painted a series of watercolours of chalk hill figures in the English landscape. The Leicester Galleries sold three of these paintings to British public collections, the Tate, the Victoria & Albert Museum and Aberdeen Art Gallery.

== Printmaking and illustration ==
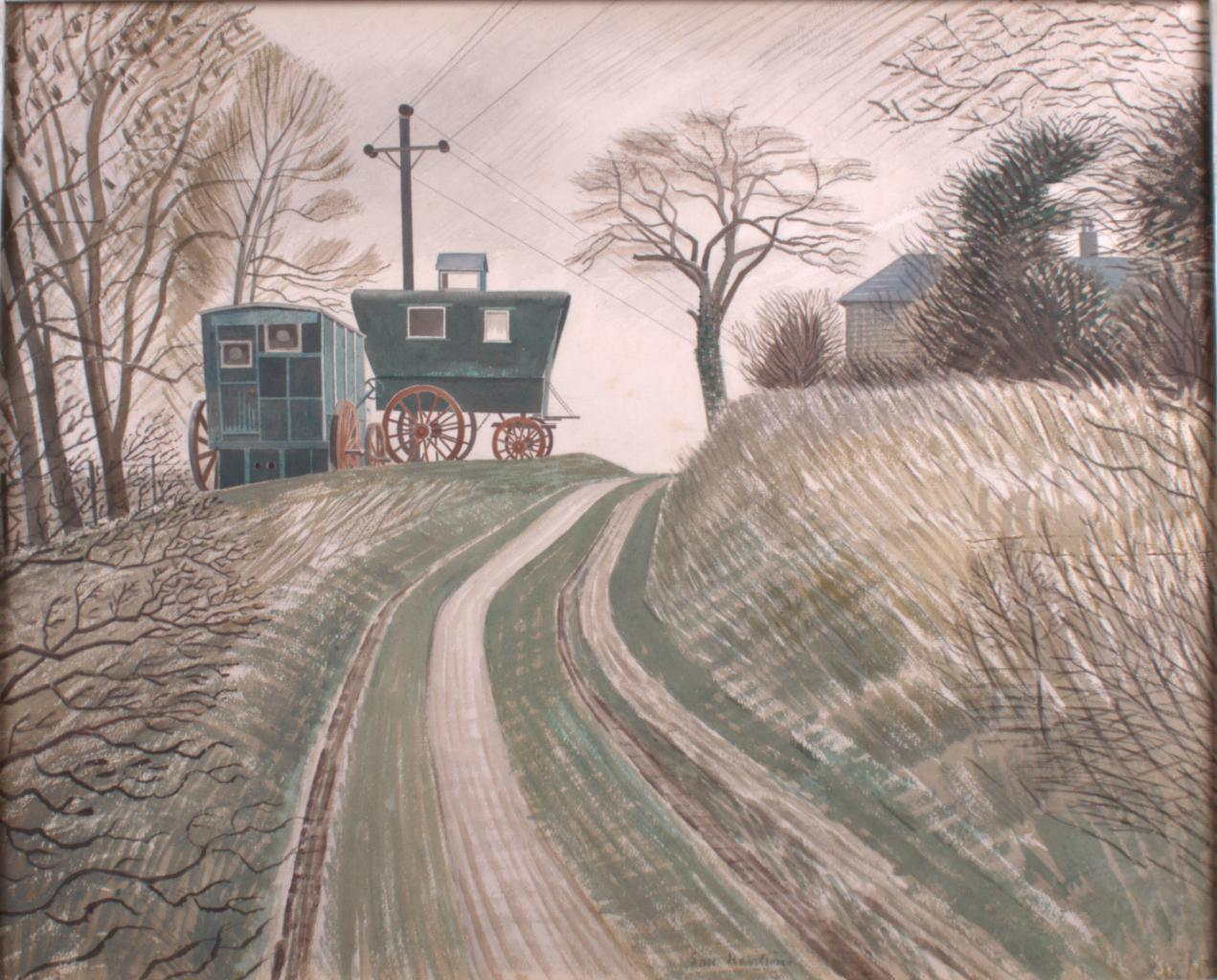
Caravans, watercolour, 1936

Ravilious engraved more than 400 illustrations and drew over forty lithographic designs for books and publications during his lifetime. His first commission, in 1926, was to illustrate a novel for Jonathan Cape. He went on to produce work both for large companies such as the Lanston Monotype Corporation and smaller, less commercial publishers, such as the Golden Cockerel Press (for whom he illustrated an edition of Twelfth Night), the Curwen Press and the Cresset Press.

His woodcut of two Victorian gentlemen playing cricket has appeared on the front cover of every edition of Wisden Cricketers' Almanack since 1938. His style of wood-engraving was greatly influenced by that of Thomas Bewick, whom both he and Bawden admired. Ravilious in turn influenced other wood engravers, such as Gwenda Morgan who also depicted scenes in the South Downs and was commissioned by the Golden Cockerel Press.

In the mid-1930s, Ravilious took up lithography, making a print of Newhaven Harbour for the "Contemporary Lithographs" scheme, and a set of full-page lithographs, mostly of shop interiors, for a book called High Street, with text by J. M. Richards. Following a trip in a submarine in the war he produced a series of lithographs on Submarines, a set of 12, one of which was entitled Submarine Dream.

== Design ==
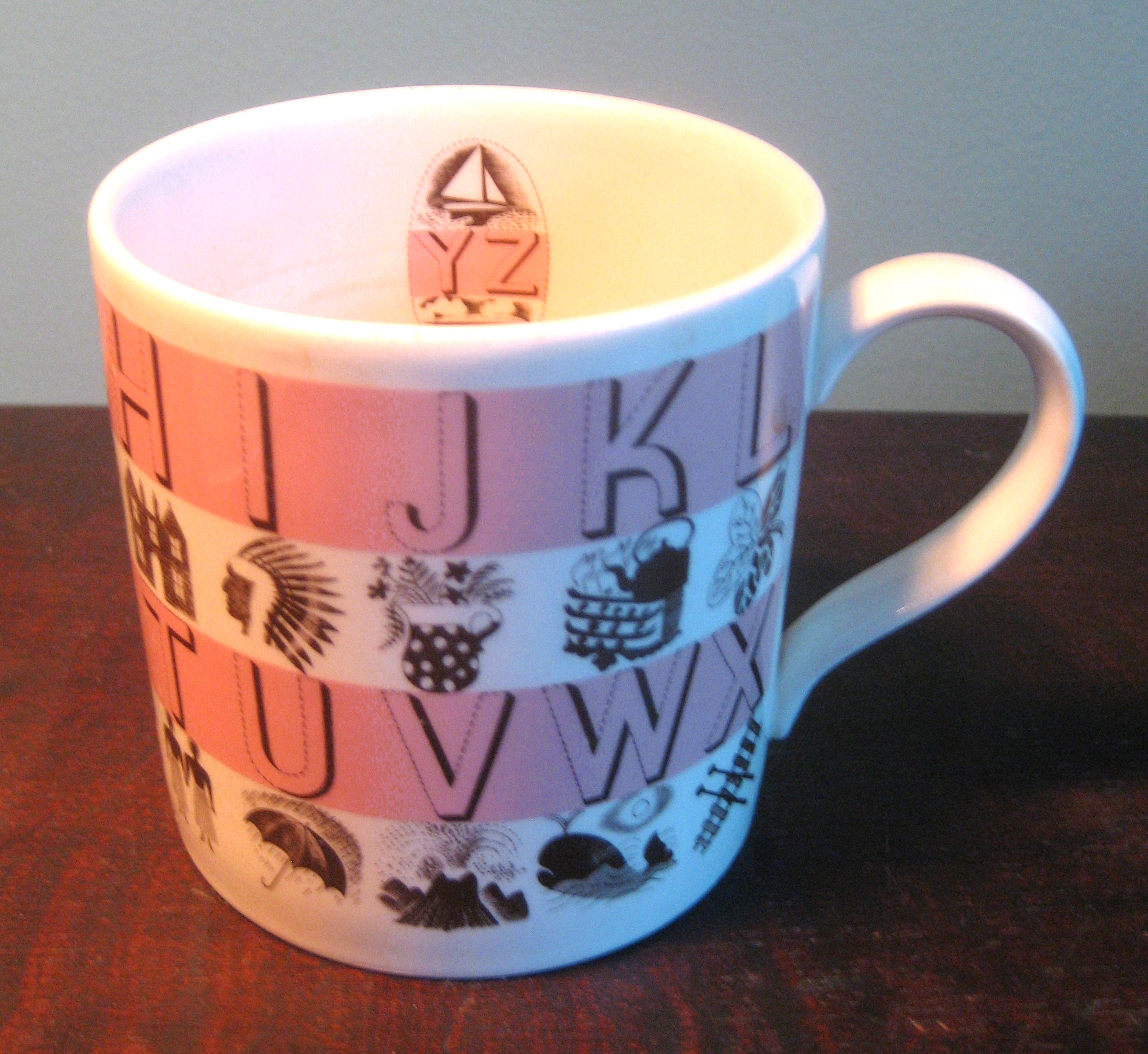
Alphabet mug by Ravilious, transfer printing on Wedgwood creamware, 1937

In February 1936, Ravilious held his second exhibition at the Zwemmer Gallery and again it was a success, with 28 out of the 36 paintings shown being sold. This exhibition also led to a commission from Wedgwood for ceramic designs. His work for them included a commemorative mug to mark the planned coronation of Edward VIII; the design was revised for the Coronation of George VI and Elizabeth.

Other popular Ravilious designs included the Alphabet mug of 1937, and the china sets, Afternoon Tea (1938), Travel (1938), and Garden Implements (1939), plus the Boat Race Day cup in 1938. Production of Ravilious' designs continued into the 1950s, with the coronation mug design being posthumously reworked for the coronation of Elizabeth II in 1953.

He also undertook glass designs for Stuart Crystal in 1934, graphic advertisements for London Transport and furniture work for Dunbar Hay in 1936. Ravilious and Bawden were both active in the campaign by the Artists' International Association to support the Republican cause in the Spanish Civil War. Throughout 1938 and 1939, Ravilious spent time working in Wales, the south of France and at Aldeburgh to prepare works for his third one-man show, which was held at the Arthur Tooth & Sons Gallery in 1939.

== Watercolour ==
Apart from a brief experimentation with oils in 1930 – inspired by the works of Johan Zoffany – Ravilious painted almost entirely in watercolour. He was especially inspired by the landscape of the South Downs around Beddingham in East Sussex. He frequently returned to Furlongs, the cottage of Peggy Angus. He said that his time there "altered my whole outlook and way of painting, I think because the colour of the landscape was so lovely and the design so beautifully obvious ... that I simply had to abandon my tinted drawings". Some of his works, such as Tea at Furlongs, were painted there.

== Murals ==
Ravilious was commissioned to paint murals on the walls of the tea room on Victoria Pier at Colwyn Bay in 1934. After the pier's partial collapse, these were thought unrecoverable, but, as of March 2018, one had been recovered in pieces and it was hoped that a second could also be saved, along with parts of another by Mary Adshead, from the pier's auditorium.

Conwy Council's conservation officer, Huw Davies, said:

Only two murals of his survive, and this was the last one in position. It's historically very significant. His work decorated the walls of the tea room and featured an underwater ruin scene with pink and purple seaweed... The murals haven't actually been on show for some time. One wall of the Eric Ravilious work has been lost because of water getting into the building, and the whole thing has been covered over with several coats of paint and plaster. There's a considerable job to do to restore them. For now, they're being stored safely in a dry place... The next stage will be to find a home for them. If the trust succeed in rebuilding the pier, we hope they could return one day.

== War artist ==
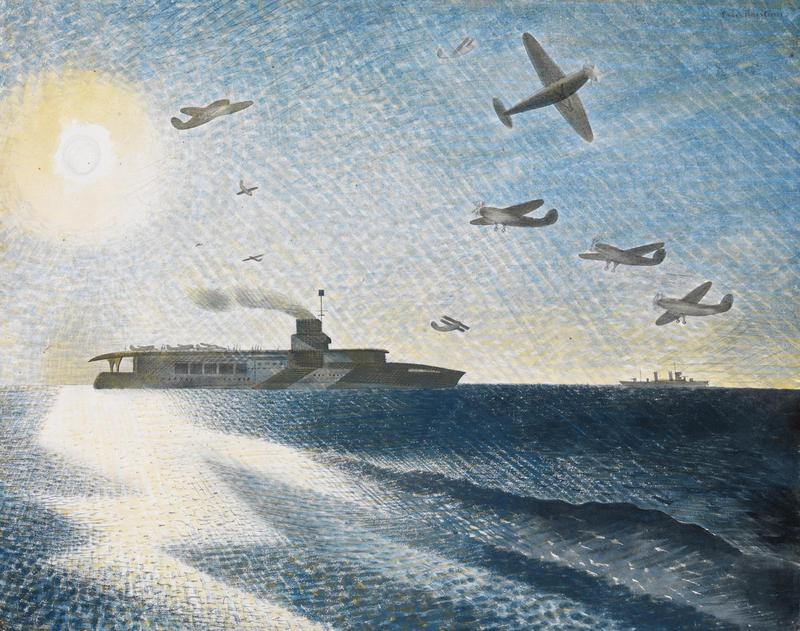
HMS Glorious in the Arctic, 1940 (Art IWM ART LD 283)

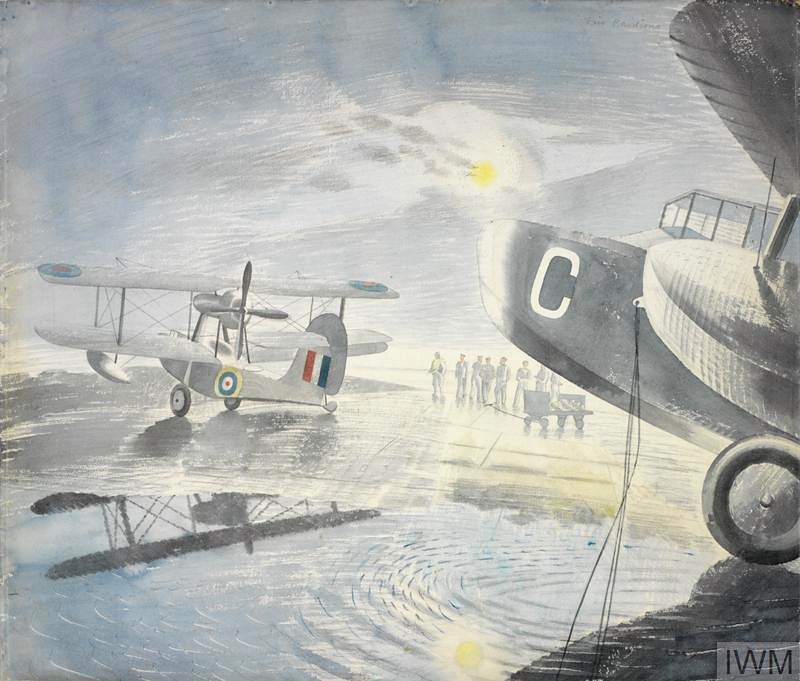
Morning on the Tarmac, 1941 (Art. IWM ART LD 1712)

Prior to the outbreak of WWII Ravilious aligned himself with anti-fascist causes, including lending his work to the 1937 exhibition Artists Against Fascism. He considered joining the military as a rifleman but was deterred by friends; he joined a Royal Observer Corps post in Hedingham at the outbreak of war. He was then accepted as a full-time salaried artist by the War Artists' Advisory Committee in December 1939. (Note: Arts and Industry magazine, whose associate editor was Ravilious' colleague Robert Harling, commented in 1940: "We cannot help thinking that this may seem an odder war to posterity when they see it reproduced in the drawings of Edward Bawden and Eric Ravilious.) He was given the rank of Honorary Captain in the Royal Marines and assigned to the Admiralty.

In February 1940, he reported to the Royal Naval barracks at Chatham Dockyard. While based there he painted ships at the dockside, barrage balloons at Sheerness and other coastal defences. Dangerous Work at Low Tide, 1940 depicts bomb disposal experts approaching a German magnetic mine on Whitstable Sands. Two members of the team Ravilious painted were later awarded the Distinguished Service Cross.

On 24 May 1940, Ravilious sailed to Norway aboard HMS Highlander which was escorting HMS Glorious and the force being sent to recapture Narvik. Highlander returned to Scapa Flow before departing for Norway a second time on 31 May 1940. From the deck of Highlander, Ravilious painted scenes of both HMS Ark Royal and HMS Glorious in action. HMS Glorious in the Arctic depicts Hawker Hurricanes and Gloster Gladiators landing on the deck of Glorious as part of the evacuation of forces from Norway on 7/8 June. The following evening Glorious was sunk, with great loss of life.

On returning from Norway, Ravilious was posted to Portsmouth from where he painted submarine interiors at Gosport and coastal defences at Newhaven. After Ravilious's third child was born in April 1941, the family moved out of Bank House to Ironbridge Farm near Shalford, Essex. The rent on this property was paid partly in cash and partly in paintings, which are among the few private works Ravilious completed during the war. In October 1941 Ravilious transferred to Scotland, having spent six months based at Dover. In Scotland, Ravilious first stayed with John Nash and his wife at their cottage on the Firth of Forth and painted convoy subjects from the signal station on the Isle of May. At the Royal Naval Air Station in Dundee, Ravilious drew, and sometimes flew in, the Supermarine Walrus seaplanes based there.

In early 1942, Ravilious was posted to York but shortly afterwards was allowed to return home to Shalford when his wife was diagnosed with breast cancer. There he worked on his York paintings and requested a posting to a nearby RAF base while Garwood recovered from a mastectomy. He spent a short time at RAF Debden before moving to RAF Sawbridgeworth in Hertfordshire. At Sawbridgeworth he began flying regularly in the de Havilland Tiger Moths based at the flying school there and would sketch other planes in flight from the rear cockpit of the plane.

== Death ==
On 28 August 1942, Ravilious flew to Reykjavík in Iceland and then travelled on to RAF Kaldadarnes. The day he arrived there, 1 September, a Lockheed Hudson aircraft had failed to return from a patrol. At dawn the next morning three aircraft were despatched to search for the missing plane and Ravilious opted to join one of the crews. His aircraft failed to return, and after four days of further searching, the RAF declared Ravilious and the four-man crew lost in action. His body was never recovered and he is commemorated on the Chatham Naval Memorial.

In 1946, Ravilious's widow, Tirzah, married Anglo-Irish radio producer Henry Swanzy, having been introduced by Peggy Angus.

== Collections and exhibitions ==
Ravilious only held three solo exhibitions during his life from which the majority of works were bought by private collectors. Other than the large number of war-time pictures held by the Imperial War Museum, significant numbers of works by Ravilious only began to be acquired by public museums and galleries in the 1970s when the collection held by Edward Bawden started to come on the art market. The largest collection is held at the Towner Gallery in Eastbourne, while the Fry Art Gallery in Saffron Walden also has a major collection.

Works by Ravilious are also held by the Bristol Museum & Art Gallery, the Faringdon Collection at Buscot Park, the Ingram Collection of Modern British Art, The Priseman Seabrook Collection, the Wiltshire Museum and the Victoria and Albert Museum.

A touring exhibition organised by the Victor Batte-Lay Trust named "Eric Ravilious 1903 – 1942" was held at The Minories, Colchester in 1972. The Minories held an exhibition on graphic art and book illustration in 2009, named "Graphic art and the art of illustration" which featured Ravilious.

In April to August 2015, the Dulwich Picture Gallery in London held what it called "the first major exhibition to survey" his watercolours, with more than 80 on display.

In 2017, The Towner Gallery marked the 75th anniversary of Ravilious' death with Ravilious & Co: The Pattern of Friendship, an exhibition that explored the relationships and working collaborations between Ravilious and his friends and affiliates.

In 2021, Mackerel Sky, a painting by Ravilious that had been 'missing' for 82 years, was found. The new owner lent it to the Hastings Contemporary art gallery for its "Seaside Modern Exhibition".

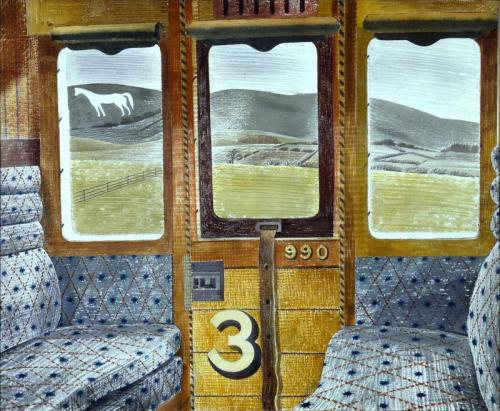
Train Landscape, 1940 (Aberdeen Art Gallery)

From September 2021 to January 2022, the Wiltshire Museum in Devizes held an exhibition titled Eric Ravilious: Downland Man which featured loans from a number of National Museums including the V&A, the British Museum and the Imperial War Museum as well as paintings held in private collections.

To mark its reopening as The Arc in February 2022, the former Winchester Discovery Centre staged Extraordinary Everyday: The Art & Design of Eric Ravilious. The exhibition was curated for the Hampshire Cultural Trust and featured wood engravings, watercolours, books, ceramics and lithographs.

In 2022, he was the subject of the film Eric Ravilious: Drawn to War written and directed by Margy Kinmonth.

As part of celebrations in 2025 commemorating 200 years of the modern railway, the painting Train Landscape in the collection of Aberdeen Art Gallery was the winner of a global public vote organised by Art UK and Railway 200 to determine the world's best-loved UK railway artwork.

In 2026 fifteen previously unknown drawings by Ravilious, created in 1930 for London's bus authorities, which had been rescued from a skip, were discovered in an attic. Ravilious had been paid 10 guineas for the set of drawings (about £900 today).

== Sources ==
- Constable, Freda (1982). The England of Eric Ravilious. London: Scolar Press.
