= Naked Hollywood =

British television series

Naked Hollywood is a 6 part TV series directed by Margy Kinmonth. The film includes Arnold Schwarzenegger, James Caan, Barry Diller, Joe Roth, Sydney Pollack, Oliver Stone, James Brooks, Nora Ephron, Terry Gilliam and many more. The film won a British Academy Film Award for Best Factual Series.

== Premise ==
The series follows talent agents in Hollywood as they secure deals, recruit clients from rival agencies, and manage emerging actors during a period of growth in the film industry.

== Episodes ==
- The Actor and the Star - 24 February 1991
- Four Million Dollars is Cheap - 3 March 1991
- Good Cop, Bad Cop - 10 March 1991
- Funny for Money - 17 March 1991
- Eighteen Months to Live - 24 March 1991
- One Foot In, One Foot Out - 31 March 1991
