= War Art with Eddie Redmayne =

- Promotional poster
- Directed by: Margy Kinmonth
- Music by: Finn Keane
- Country of origin: United Kingdom
- Original language: English

Production
- Producers: Margy Kinmonth; Maureen Murray
- Cinematography: Rob Goldie
- Editor: Roger Guertin
- Production companies: Foxtrot Films; ITV

Original release
- Network: ITV
- Release: 24 May 2015

War Art with Eddie Redmayne is a documentary film written and directed by Margy Kinmonth. Produced by Foxtrot Films Ltd, it was made as part of the ITV’s Perspectives (TV series) strand. Eddie Redmayne (who studied History of Art at Cambridge University) stars.

== Content ==
The film comments on various canvases related to World War I and is based on interviews with artists and war historians.

== Contributors ==
- Eddie Redmayne
- George Butler
- Graeme Lothian
- Julia Midgley
- Peter Howson
- Alexandra Milton
