= Edmund Jolliffe =

British composer

Edmund Jolliffe is a British composer of contemporary classical, choral and commercial music. He has written for television and the concert hall. His music is published by Associated Board of the Royal Schools of Music, Oxford University Press, Stainer and Bell and Banks Music.

In 2007 his organ piece "Quiet Rush" was picked as one of the premieres of the year by Classical Music Magazine. It was also played at the Annual Festival of New Organ Music in 2009. Subsequently, choral composition has become his main focus: In 2019 he won the 40th Ithaca College Choral Composition Competition and the Freudig Singers Choral Composition. His piece 'Dreaming Figurines' was voted 3rd from 344 in the Progressive Classical Music Award 2019.

Jolliffe graduated from Hertford College, Oxford in 1994 and the Royal College of Music under Academy Award-winner Dario Marianelli. He studied at Dartington International Summer School and completed residencies at Banff Center for the Arts, Canada and the Helene Wurlitzer Foundation, New Mexico.

Jolliffe writes music for television, sometimes with the composer Julian Hamlin. They have composed music for the BBC TV series Who Do You Think You Are?, Sort Your Life Out, additional music for 'The Traitors', the ITV series, Long Lost Family and Channel Four's Unreported World (series 24- present) as well as Grand Designs: The Street. In 2016, his score to Elizabeth at 90 - a Family Tribute was nominated for an RTS Award for best score. Other films related to royalty include A Jubilee Tribute to the Queen, Prince Charles at 60 and Prince Charles at 70. In 2021, "Quentin Blake: My Life in Drawing" scored by Jolliffe was broadcast on Christmas Day 2022. His music for the programme for Fantastic Mr Dahl was an extra on the DVD of Tim Burton's Charlie and the Chocolate Factory.
