= Jeremy Hosking =

British businessman and political donor (born 1958)

- Born: 20 July 1958 (age 68)
- Education: Rugby School, Warwickshire
- Alma mater: St Catharine's College, Cambridge
- Occupation: Businessman
- Known for: Co-founder Marathon Asset Management
- Political party: Reclaim (2020–present); Reform UK (2019–present); Conservative
- Spouse: Elizabeth Hosking (m. 1993)

Jeremy John Hosking (born 20 July 1958) is a British businessman and political donor. Ranked number 351 in the Sunday Times Rich List, with a net worth of £375 million, he is a shareholder in Crystal Palace and a noted railway enthusiast. He has donated heavily to the Reclaim Party, being the sole donor in the 2023 financial year.

== Education and career ==
Hosking was educated at Rugby School and St Catharine's College, Cambridge, where he studied geography. After graduating in 1979, he was a director and portfolio manager with GT Capital Management, dealing in southeast Asian investments.

Hosking was a founding shareholder in Marathon Asset Management, established in 1986. In 2012, Hosking set up Dublin-listed asset manager Hosking & Co. Marathon Asset Management accused Hosking of breaching contractual and fiduciary duties while working there because he discussed plans for a new business with other employees. In 2015, Hosking was ordered to pay £1.38 million in damages, and a further £10.4 million; half of the profits Hosking received for the period between July and December 2012. Hosking unsuccessfully appealed, arguing profit shares could not be forfeited.

== Private investments ==
In March 2011, Hosking bought Gravetye Manor, a West Sussex country house hotel, out of administration.

In August 2010, Hosking was part of a four-man consortium that bought Crystal Palace out of administration. On 18 December 2015, it was announced that American investors Josh Harris and David Blitzer had bought a major share holding in the club. Whilst Steve Parish continued as chairman alongside Harris and Blitzer, fellow CPFC 2010 investors Browett, Long and Hosking each retained a reduced 8% investment.

The Guardian reported that Hosking held over £100 million in investments in fossil fuels in 2024.

Hosking was ranked number 351 in the Sunday Times Rich List, with a net worth of £375 million.

== Railways ==
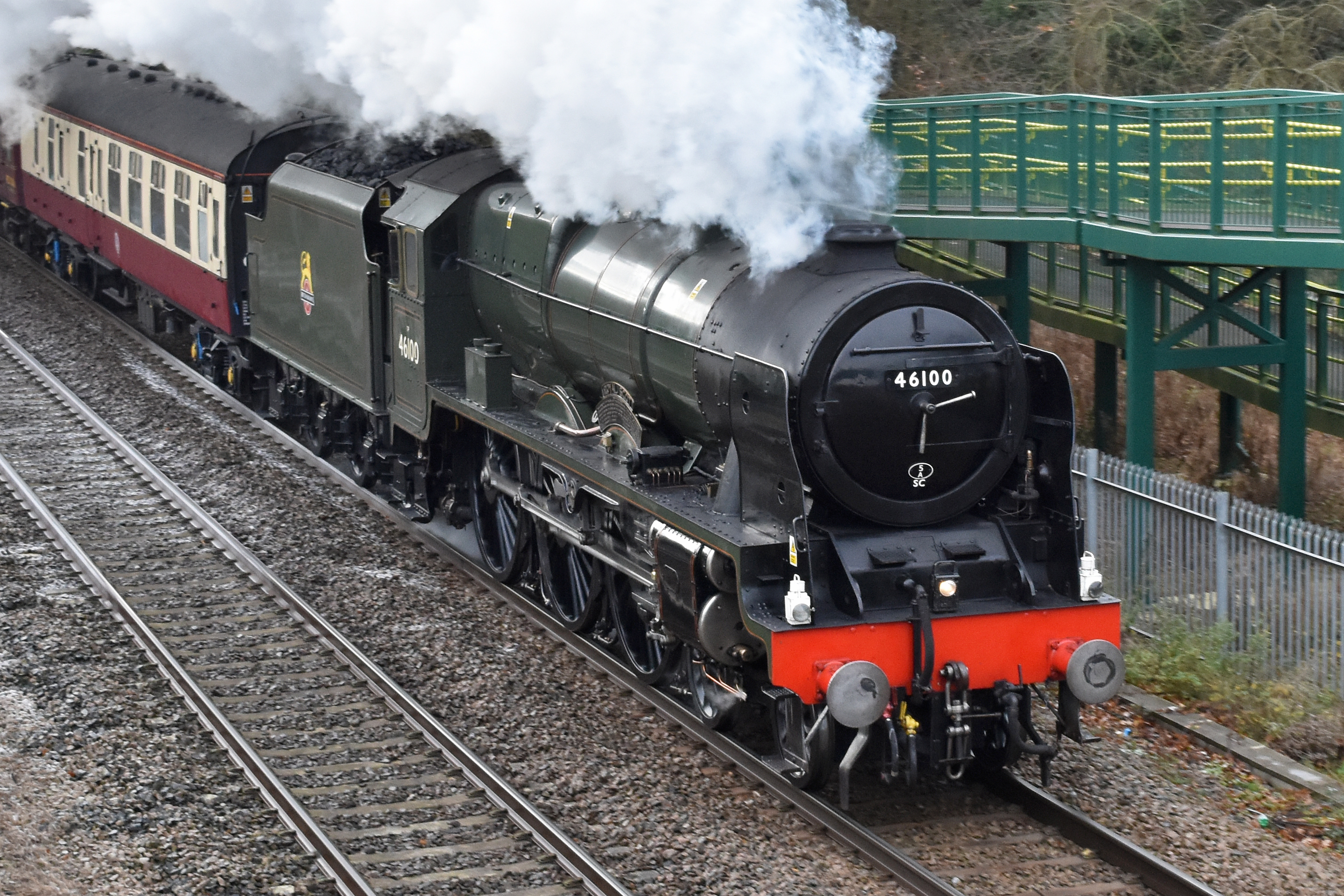
6100 Royal Scot

Hosking is a noted railway enthusiast, having purchased a number of main-line steam locomotives including 4464 Bittern, 6024 King Edward I, 6100 Royal Scot, 60532 Blue Peter and 70000 Britannia and founded the Royal Scot Locomotive and General Trust.

In 2014, Hosking purchased the London & North Western Railway Heritage business from Pete Waterman and took out a lease on Crewe Diesel TMD that became the base for heritage train operation Locomotive Services Limited in 2017. In 2016, Hosking purchased a 30% shareholding in the Dartmouth Steam Railway and in 2017 purchased the former Hornby Railways factory in Margate to establish the One:One Collection museum.

== Political activity ==
A long time Conservative Party donor, Hosking donated £1.7 million to Vote Leave in 2016 and supported pro-Brexit candidates in the 2017 general election.

In February 2019, Hosking submitted the paperwork to found a new party called Brexit Express, which would welcome Conservative Party MPs unhappy with Theresa May's Brexit plans. At the same time, he launched a public campaign in favour of a no-deal Brexit. Hosking has made major donations to the Brexit Party led by Nigel Farage. He became the founding donor to the Reclaim Party led by Laurence Fox. In the first quarter of 2021, he gave the Reclaim Party more than £1,000,000 in cash and services. In December 2021, newspapers reported he would continue to fund the Reclaim Party.

Hosking is listed in the Parliamentary register of interests as having donated legal services to Andrew Bridgen to the value of £4,470,576.42 in December 2023, "the costs of which will be repaid to the donor on an interest-free basis."

openDemocracy has criticised Hosking's opposition to net-zero, and that of the publications like Standpoint and The Critic which he funds, noting his substantial financial interest in the fossil fuel industry.

== Personal life ==
Hosking has been married to Elizabeth since 1993; they co-own Gravetye Manor after spending their wedding night there and becoming long-standing guests.
