= Bridgen =

Bridgen is a surname, and a place name, it may refer to:

== Surname ==
- Andrew Bridgen (born 1964), English politician and businessman
- Nevena Bridgen, Serbian opera singer and blogger, wife of Andrew

== Places ==
- Bridgen, London, a place near Blendon in the London Borough of Bexley, United Kingdom.

== See also ==
- Kevin Bridgens (born 1961), South African cricketer
