= Laurence Fox =

English actor and activist (born 1978)

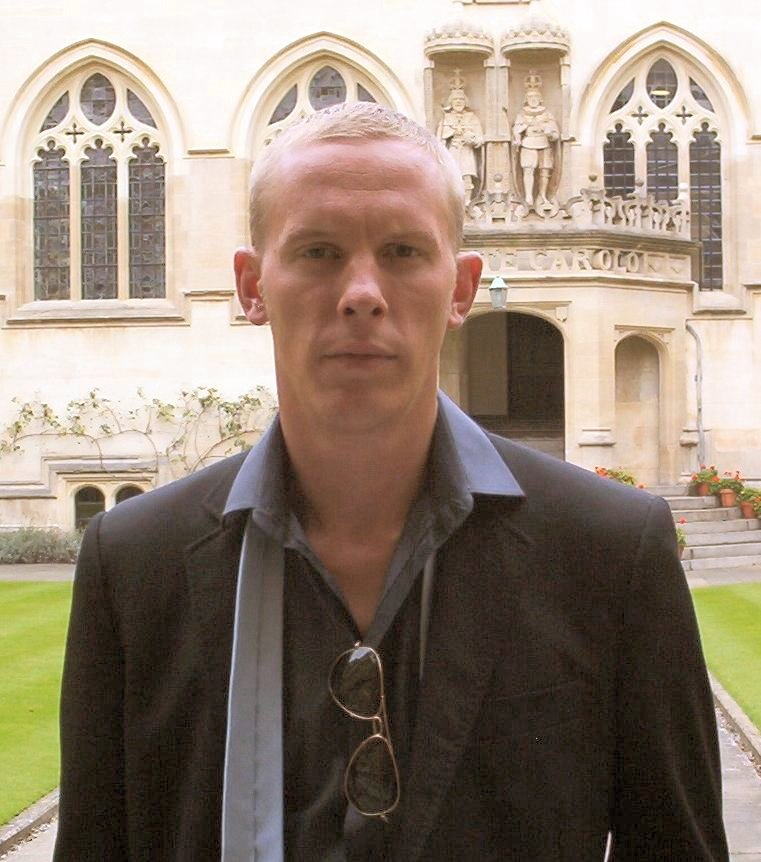
- Fox in 2008 while filming Lewis at Oriel College, University of Oxford

Leader of the Reclaim Party
- Incumbent
- Assumed office October 2020
- Preceded by: Party established

Personal details
- Born: Laurence Paul Fox; 26 May 1978 (age 48) Leeds, West Yorkshire, England
- Party: Reclaim
- Spouses: Billie Piper (m. 2007; div. 2016); Elizabeth Logan (m. 2025)
- Children: 2
- Parent: James Fox (father)
- Education: Royal Academy of Dramatic Art
- Occupation: Actor; political activist; musician

Laurence Paul Fox (born 26 May 1978) is an English actor, political activist, and founder and leader of the right-wing populist Reclaim Party. He made his acting debut in the film The Hole (2001) and his best-known role is James Hathaway in the television drama series Lewis (2006–2015).

In recent years Fox has been known more for his politics than his acting. During the COVID-19 pandemic, Fox criticised the British government's response. He also criticised the George Floyd protests that began in 2020. After founding the Reclaim Party, he stood unsuccessfully in the 2021 London mayoral election, in opposition to what he deemed "extreme political correctness", and in the 2024 London Assembly election.

== Early life and education ==
Laurence Paul Fox was born in Leeds on 26 May 1978, the son of Mary Elizabeth Piper and actor James Fox. His paternal grandfather was talent agent Robin Fox and his paternal grandmother was Angela Worthington, whose father was playwright Frederick Lonsdale.

He has two elder brothers, Tom and Robin, a younger sister named Lydia, and a younger brother named Jack. Robin is a film producer, while Lydia and Jack are actors; Lydia is married to comedian and filmmaker Richard Ayoade.

His paternal uncles are the actor Edward Fox and producer Robert Fox. He is a first cousin of the actors Emilia Fox and Freddie Fox, the children of his uncle Edward.

Fox was raised as an evangelical Christian. From the age of 13 years, he was educated at Harrow School, from which he was expelled a few weeks before his A-Level exams. He was unable to obtain a place at any university due to an unfavourable report about him from Harrow School.

After working as a gardener, and in an office, he followed his family into acting, and successfully auditioned for the exclusive Royal Academy of Dramatic Art (RADA), at which he appeared in numerous productions, including the lead roles of Gregers Werle in Ibsen's The Wild Duck, Marcus Andronicus in Titus Andronicus, and Stephen Daedalus in an adaptation of James Joyce's novel Ulysses. He graduated from RADA in 2001.

== Acting ==
Fox made his acting debut in the horror-thriller film The Hole (2001). He next appeared in Robert Altman's film Gosford Park (2001). He then donned uniforms in a slew of film and television features, including roles as a German airman in Island at War (2004), an SS officer in The Last Drop (2005), and as British soldiers in the 2002 films Deathwatch and Ultimate Force, and in Colditz (2005). Actor Kevin Whately caught Fox's performance in the last ten minutes of the film. The next day, at a meeting regarding a new project, Whately mentioned that Fox "would be worth taking a look at".

As a result, Fox was cast in the ITV detective drama Lewis as Detective Sergeant James Hathaway, who becomes the partner of Detective Inspector Robert Lewis, played by Whately. The pilot of this spin-off from Inspector Morse (1987–2000) was ITV's highest-rated drama of 2006.

Fox has portrayed Prince Charles, in Whatever Love Means (2005); Wisley, one of Jane Austen's suitors, in Becoming Jane (2007); and Sir Christopher Hatton, the Lord Chancellor of England, in Elizabeth: The Golden Age, also released in 2007. In the same year Fox was seen on ITV as Cecil Vyse in Andrew Davies's adaptation of A Room with a View based on E. M. Forster's 1908 novel.

On stage, Fox appeared in Mrs. Warren's Profession by George Bernard Shaw at the Strand Theatre (now the Novello Theatre) in London in 2002, and John Ford's 17th-century play 'Tis Pity She's a Whore in 2005. Between 2006 and 2007 he starred in Treats by Christopher Hampton with his future wife, Billie Piper. In April 2007, Fox received a police caution after he was arrested for assault when he punched a photographer outside the Garrick Theatre in London where he was performing in Treats. The caution remained on his record for three years. In 2013, Fox played Guy Haines in Strangers on a Train at London's Gielgud Theatre. On 9 May 2015, he read a letter written by a soldier three days before his death in the Second World War, as part of VE Day 70: A Party to Remember, an anniversary concert for VE Day.

In 2018, Fox joined the cast of the ITV series Victoria, for its third season, playing Lord Palmerston.

In November 2020, Fox was dropped by his talent agency, Artists Rights Group, after stating on Question Time that an audience member's description of him as a "white privileged male" was "racist". He had been dropped by his previous managers, Authentic Talent, earlier in the year.

In 2021, Fox portrayed Hunter Biden in filmmaker Robert Davi's biopic My Son Hunter, starring alongside fellow conservatives Gina Carano and John James, the former of whom was also dropped by her agent after allegedly expressing some of the same opinions as Fox. The film was distributed by the American right-wing media company Breitbart.

== Other media ==
=== Music ===
Fox has released two albums, Holding Patterns in 2016 and A Grief Observed in 2019. The former charted, at no. 89, but the latter did not.

In 2019 Fox released the song "The Distance (You Can't Say Anything These Days)" featuring Izo FitzRoy.

=== Broadcasting ===
From November 2022, Fox presented a regular Friday night slot on GB News.

In September 2023, during an appearance on Dan Wootton's GB News show, Fox said of journalist Ava Evans: "Show me a single self-respecting man that would like to climb into bed with that woman ever [...] That little woman has been fed, spoon-fed oppression day after day after day." He concluded by saying: "Who'd want to shag that?" Fox and Wootton, along with Calvin Robinson, were suspended by the channel. Fox released on Twitter an apparent private message exchange with Wootton in which he had reacted approvingly to what Fox had said. In early October 2023, GB News confirmed that, following its investigation, it had terminated the contracts of Fox and Robinson. Ofcom, the government's broadcasting regulatory body, opened an investigation into the incident. Ofcom announced that the incident was the most complained-about broadcast on British television in 2023, with the regulator receiving 8,867 complaints. On 4 March 2024 Ofcom ruled that Fox's "misogynistic" comments broke broadcasting rules and "were degrading and demeaning both to [her] and women generally".

== Views ==
=== Diversity in acting ===
In 2016, Fox criticised Julie Walters and Christopher Eccleston for speaking about a lack of working-class voices in acting. He said: "I think people should keep pretty quiet about stuff like that especially given the money they earn. It's not completely true either. And didn't Julie Walters get paid 400 grand using taxpayers' money to do something recently? She's a really sweet woman but, please, shut up."

In 2020, Fox told James Delingpole in a podcast: "The most annoying thing is the minute a black actor — it's the same with working-class actors — the minute they've got five million quid in the bank, every interview they do is about how racism is rampant and rife in the industry."

=== Political correctness ===
In a November 2019 interview with The Times to promote his second album, Fox said YouTube videos had "totally radicalised" him against "woke culture" and "political correctness".

=== COVID-19 ===
During the COVID-19 pandemic, Fox criticised the British government's response to the pandemic and encouraged people to disregard the government's social distancing guidance and disobey other public health restrictions. On X, he wrote that "if the NHS can't cope, then the NHS isn't fit for purpose". Good Morning Britain hosts Piers Morgan and Susanna Reid criticised this, telling him to "shut up." During a national lockdown in March 2021, Fox participated in an anti-lockdown protest.

=== Race and racism ===
Appearing as a panellist, alongside his then-girlfriend the high tory journalist Madeline Grant, on the BBC's political debate programme Question Time in January 2020, Fox said that Meghan Markle was not a victim of racism and described an audience member who called him a "white privileged male" as racist. The British actors' union Equity called him "a disgrace to our industry" for his views, but withdrew its criticism and apologised two months later.

In January 2020, Fox attracted media attention for stating that the depiction of a Sikh soldier in the film 1917 was "forced diversity" in spite of Sikh soldiers having fought on the Western Front in the First World War. When interviewed, he explained, "I suppose it would have been less incongruous to me if he'd got on the truck to a whole regiment of Sikh soldiers. [...] I mean, as you've noticed, I say quite a lot of unfortunate things, but I think it's really important that one is able to express one's opinion." He followed by apologising on Twitter to "fellow humans who are Sikhs" and wrote, "I am as moved by the sacrifices your relatives made as I am by the loss of all those who die in war, whatever creed or colour. Please accept my apology for being clumsy in the way I expressed myself."

In August 2021, Fox posted a tweet stating "get kneeling, fuckers" about the recent arrest of black footballer Benjamin Mendy on charges of rape and sexual assault. The tweet was removed by Twitter and the account was temporarily locked for violating its rules against "hateful conduct".

In August 2023, Fox posted a photo of himself in blackface, describing himself as having "racially transitioned".

=== Progress pride flag ===
In June 2022, Fox tweeted an image of a swastika made from the progress pride flag with the caption, "You can openly call the [Union Flag] a symbol of fascism and totalitarianism on Twatter [sic]. You cannot criticise the holy flags." This led to him being suspended from Twitter for a day. His actions were publicly condemned by the Holocaust Memorial Day Trust and the Campaign Against Antisemitism.

== Political activity ==
=== Reclaim Party ===
After becoming "a prominent right-wing commentator" around the time of the pandemic, in 2020, Fox attracted funding for a new political party, provisionally called Reclaim, and dubbed "UKIP for culture". In October 2020, Fox became leader of the party, succeeding Jeremy Hosking.

It emerged in October 2020 that the party name had yet to be successfully registered with the Electoral Commission and that there was a naming conflict with the "Reclaim Project" of Manchester, an established charity in Manchester endeavouring to give opportunities to working-class children. The name Reclaim Party was approved in February 2021 as an identity mark for Brexit Express.

In May 2023, the Reclaim Party gained its first MP, Andrew Bridgen, after he was expelled from the governing Conservative Party. Bridgen resigned from the party in December 2023 due to a "difference in the direction of the party".

In July 2023, Fox stood in the 2023 Uxbridge and South Ruislip by-election as a Reclaim Party candidate. He finished fourth with 2.3% of the vote, losing his deposit.

=== 2021 candidacy for London mayor ===
In March 2021, Fox announced he would stand in the London mayoral election, to "fight against extreme political correctness" and pledging to "end the Met's obsession with diversity and inclusivity."

The major source of Fox's campaign funds was Brexit backer Jeremy Hosking, who, in the first quarter of 2021, gave the Reclaim Party more than £1,000,000 in cash and services. Fox finished in sixth place with 47,634 votes (1.9%) in the mayoral election losing his £10,000 election deposit.

=== 2024 London elections ===
Fox attempted to stand in 2024 London mayoral election but failed to fill in the nomination forms correctly. The election authorities returned Fox's deposit and other fees.

He was a candidate on the London-wide list in the 2024 London Assembly election, though he stood under 'no description', rather than for Reclaim. He received 13,795 out of a total 2,476,687 votes (0.56%) and was not elected, losing his £5,000 deposit.

=== 2026 Clacton by-election ===
In 2026, Fox announced his intention of standing in the Clacton by-election against incumbent MP Nigel Farage, leader of Reform UK. He received 437 votes out of a total 35,118, finishing 6th in voting and getting 1% of the votes, failing to clear the 5% threshold to reclaim his £500 deposit and being bested by not just by Farage, who won with 22,239 votes, but also Count Binface, who came second with 9,455 votes (26.9%), and Rejoin EU candidate John Stevens, who came in 3rd and received 492 votes (1.4%).

== Legal issues ==
=== Defamation cases ===
==== 2021 Blake, Seymour and Thorp v Fox defamation and libel lawsuit ====
In October 2020, Fox announced he would boycott the supermarket Sainsbury's because they "support racial segregation and discrimination", making reference to the store establishing "safe spaces" for black employees, while asking others to do the same. Sainsbury's later clarified that the safe spaces were online support groups established in response to Black Lives Matter and were promoted as part of support for Black History Month. Feeling he was "falsely smeared as a racist", Fox replied to a number of tweets reacting to that announcement by calling their authors paedophiles. Two of those people, RuPaul's Drag Race UK contestant Crystal (Colin Seymour) and Simon Blake, deputy chair of the LGBT rights charity Stonewall, both gay men, later announced they would sue Fox for defamation. Fox deleted the tweets and explained in further tweets that he wanted to teach people a lesson in calling people something which they are not.

In April 2021, Crystal and Blake lodged a claim for defamation in the High Court and were joined in the legal action by actress Nicola Thorp, whom Fox also called a paedophile. In response, Fox filed a countersuit over the accusations of racism. In December 2021, judge Barbara Fontaine urged the protagonists to reach a compromise; Fox's lawyers had estimated his legal costs would be between £360,000 and £500,000 for a full trial.

In April 2022, Fox requested a jury trial and said that "a judge could show involuntary bias", the first such request since the Defamation Act 2013. It was refused. Court documents revealed that this request cost Fox legal fees of more than £116,000. Later that month the High Court ruled that Fox must pay more than £36,000 in legal fees to Blake, Seymour and Thorp.

The trial progressed at the High Court to decisions on preliminary issues such as the "natural and ordinary" meanings of the tweets, which included that they were a factual claim that "Ms Thorp was a paedophile". Fox took this decision to the Court of Appeal, who ruled in August 2023 that they were "satisfied that the ordinary reasonable reader of that tweet would not have taken the word [paedophile] literally", but dismissed Fox's other challenges.

The libel trial and trials for counterclaims were heard between 22 November and 1 December 2023 at the High Court by Mrs Justice Collins Rice as judge, with Blake and Seymour as claimants, against Fox as defendant and counterclaimant, and Thorp as defendant to the counterclaim.

On 29 January 2024 a judgement was given with Justice Collins Rice ruling in favour of the claimants. The judge ruled that Fox's labelling of Crystal and Blake as paedophiles was "seriously harmful, defamatory and baseless" and Fox's tweets "the very epitome of 'mere retaliation' – an escalatory and disproportionate response by way of entirely irrelevant statements." In ruling against Fox, the judge summarised that "the law affords few defences to defamation of this sort. Mr Fox did not attempt to show these allegations were true, and he was not able to bring himself on the facts within the terms of any other defence recognised in law."

Fox's counterclaims of defamation against Crystal, Blake and Thorp were also dismissed. Whilst the judge did not make a judgement on whether or not describing Fox as "a racist" was "substantially true", the judge ruled that the expression of such opinions were unlikely to significantly damage his reputation and that there were multiple other probable causes to any reputational damage. The judge summarised that "Mr Fox did not attempt to show these allegations were true, and he was not able to bring himself on the facts within the terms of any other defence recognised in law".

On 25 April 2024, it was announced that Fox would have to pay a total of £180,000 in compensatory damages to Crystal and Blake. Fox appealed the verdict, and in October 2025 the Court of Appeal reduced the sum of damages to £90,000 and ordered the cases brought by Fox to be re-tried. In April 2026 Fox was denied leave to appeal to the Supreme Court.

==== 2024 Olympics defamation complaint ====
During the opening ceremonies of the 2024 Summer Olympics in Paris on 26 July, Fox commented on a segment featuring French drag performer and host of Drag Race France Nicky Doll, along with other French drag performers, calling them "deviant little pedos" and "child fuckers" on Twitter. Nicky Doll responded the following day on Twitter saying "Lawyer on the line, see you in court!" Doll later posted on 2 August that he had filed a defamation complaint against Fox and other Twitter users through lawyer Anne-Sophie Laguens and NGO STOP Homophobia.

==== 2024 Fox v Yassin libel lawsuit ====
On 31 January 2024, a hearing was held at the High Court whereby Fox took legal action against a man who called him a "racist" on social media. Fox sued Mukhtar Ali Yassin for libel over a row on X (formerly known as Twitter) over four tweets sent during the exchange in May 2023. Ben Gallop, representing Fox, told the court that Yassin had made "seriously defamatory allegations of racism against my client that are bare comments". Judge Mrs Justice Collins Rice ruled that a hearing should take place to decide whether the posts were statements of fact or opinion, and what should be included in any future trial. Fox said in March 2024 that he had discontinued the case; Yassin said Fox had agreed to its dismissal, paying thousands of pounds of legal fees to do so.

=== Criminal cases ===
==== 2023 ULEZ protest arrest ====
On 4 October 2023, it was reported that Fox had been arrested by police on suspicion of conspiring to commit criminal damage to ULEZ cameras and encouraging or assisting offences to be committed. He was reported as having said on the previous day in an interview on Rumble that he declared support for a ULEZ vigilante group, saying: "I encourage them to tear down every single camera there is and I will be joining them [...] I am pretty close with several and I will be out there with my angle grinder."

In May 2025, it was reported that Fox had been charged with intentionally encouraging or assisting the commission of an offence, and was expected to appear in court to answer the charge.

==== 2024 upskirt photo incident ====
On 3 May 2024, multiple news sources reported that Fox was under investigation by police for allegedly sharing an upskirt photo of the broadcaster Narinder Kaur on Twitter. Fox said he "would like to apologise" to Kaur, stating it was not his fault that Kaur was pictured in the compromising image more than 15 years ago.

On 25 March 2025, Fox was charged with a sexual offence in relation to an alleged breach of section 66A of the Sexual Offences Act 2003, with Fox alleged to have intentionally shared sexual images of someone without their consent, with the aim of causing alarm, distress, or humiliation, or for sexual gratification. Fox responded by describing the allegations as "untrue, ridiculous, vexatious and malicious nonsense", stating: "This is yet another deeply concerning example of the two-tier British justice system in all its Soviet glory."

On 12 June 2025 at Woolwich Crown Court, a trial date was set for 6 December 2027 at the same court. If found guilty, Fox could be placed on the Violent and Sex Offender Register and face up to two years in jail.

== Personal life ==
In an October 2012 Independent interview, Fox described himself as a "vaguely lapsed Christian" who occasionally prays and thinks "the world is a better place for people who believe in God" despite not having "squared that circle" himself.

=== Relationships ===
Fox met actress Billie Piper while they were performing together in the play Treats in 2006. They started dating soon after, and were married on 31 December 2007. Fox and Piper have two sons. They divorced in May 2016. In 2024, Piper commented on the divorce in British Vogue, where she expressed the desire for her children to have privacy and anonymity, and the difficulty of this given Fox's public profile. Fox disputed some of Piper's claims. He also said that the pair had been to court many times since their split and criticised the family court system as biased towards the mother.

In 2020, Fox had a relationship with the journalist Madeline Grant.

In July 2025, Fox married Elizabeth Logan.

== Filmography ==
=== Film ===
Year	Title	Role	Refs
2001	The Hole	Geoff Bingham	
2001	Gosford Park	Lord Rupert Standish	
2002	Deathwatch	Captain Bramwell Jennings	
2003	Al sur de Granada	Ralph Partridge	
2005	The Last Drop	SS Major Kessler	
2007	Becoming Jane	Mr. Wisley	
2007	Elizabeth: The Golden Age	Sir Christopher Hatton	
2011	W.E.	Bertie	
2019	The Professor and the Madman	Philip Lyttelton Gell	
2022	My Son Hunter	Hunter Biden	

=== Television ===
Year	Title	Role	Notes	Ref.
2002	Ultimate Force	Cpl. Mick Sharp	"Something to Do with Justice"; "Natural Selection"	
2003	Foyle's War	Simon Walker	Episode: "War Games"	
2004	Island at War	Airman Bernhardt Tellemann		
2004	AD/BC: A Rock Opera	Townsfolk		
2005	Colditz	Capt. Tom Willis		
2005	Jericho	Peter Bridgewater	Episode: "The Killing of Johnny Swan"	
2005	Egypt	Leonard	"The Search for Tutankhamun"; "The Curse of Tutankhamun"	
2005	Whatever Love Means	Charles, Prince of Wales		
2006	Agatha Christie's Marple: The Sittaford Mystery	James Pearson		
2006–2015	Lewis	D.S. James Hathaway		
2007	A Room with a View	Cecil Vyse		
2008	Wired	Philip Manningham		
2011	Fast Freddie, The Widow and Me	Jonathan Donald		
2015	Bear Grylls: Mission Survive	Himself, contestant		
2017	The Frankenstein Chronicles	Frederick Dipple	Series 2	
2017	Frankie Drake Mysteries	Greg Mills	"The Pilot" (S1:E8)	
2019	Victoria	Lord Palmerston		
2020	White Lines	David		

Some information in this table was obtained from Laurence Fox: Filmography, Internet Movie Database (IMDb).

=== Theatre ===
Year	Title	Role	Venue	Ref.
19–28 October 2000	Kit's Play by Howard Brenton	The DG/Earl of Northumberland	Jerwood Vanbrugh Theatre, London, England	
[While at RADA]	The Wild Duck (1884) by Henrik Ibsen	Gregers Werle		
[While at RADA]	Titus Andronicus (1584 – early 1590s) by William Shakespeare	Marcus Andronicus		
[While at RADA]	Ulysses based on the James Joyce novel first published in its entirety in 1922	Stephen Daedalus		
[While at RADA]	The Wild Goose Chase (1652) by John Fletcher	Belleur		
[While at RADA]	The Provoked Wife (17th century) by John Vanbrugh	Constant		
8–17 February 2001	Hobson's Choice (first performed 1916) by Harold Brighouse	Fred Beanstock	Jerwood Vanbrugh Theatre, London, England	
2002	Mrs Warren's Profession (1893) by George Bernard Shaw	Frank Gardner	Strand Theatre, London, England	
2005	'Tis Pity She's a Whore (first performed 1629–1633) by John Ford	Soranzo	Southwark Playhouse, London, England; and United Kingdom tour	
2006–2007	Treats (1975) by Christopher Hampton	Patrick	Garrick Theatre, Richmond Theatre, Royal Court Theatre and Southwark Playhouse, London, England	
2012	Our Boys (1993) by Jonathan Guy Lewis	Joe	Duchess Theatre, London, England	
2013–2014	Strangers on a Train	Guy Haines	Gielgud Theatre, London, England	
2016	The Patriotic Traitor	Charles de Gaulle	Park Theatre, London, England	

Some information in this table was obtained from the following websites: Laurence Fox, Royal Academy of Dramatic Art, archived from the original on 3 February 2008; Laurence Fox: Other works, Internet Movie Database (IMDb).

== Discography ==
Albums

- Holding Patterns (2016)
- A Grief Observed (2019)

Singles/EPs

- "Gunfight" (2012)
- "So Be Damned" (2013)
- Sorry for My Words EP (2013)
- "Headlong" (2015)
- "Rise Again" (2016)
