= Reclaim Party =

Political party in the United Kingdom

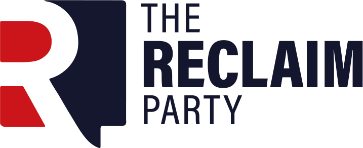
- Leader: Laurence Fox
- Founders: Laurence Fox; Jeremy Hosking
- Founded: October 2020
- Preceded by: Brexit Express
- Headquarters: Carlyle House; 235 Vauxhall Bridge Road; London; SW1V 1EJ
- Ideology: Right-wing populism; British nationalism; Social conservatism
- Political position: Right-wing to far-right

Website
- reclaimparty.co.uk

The Reclaim Party, formerly known as Brexit Express, is a right-wing populist and far-right political party in the United Kingdom. It was launched in 2020 by English political activist and actor Laurence Fox, with all of its funding from a single donor, Jeremy Hosking. It does not solicit donations nor charge membership fees.

The party has had one MP, Andrew Bridgen for North West Leicestershire, who was an MP for the Conservative Party from 2010, until his expulsion in April 2023, having had the whip suspended in January after criticising the efficacy of COVID-19 vaccines and saying that a cardiologist told him they constitute "the biggest crime against humanity since the Holocaust". He joined the Reclaim Party in May 2023 but resigned from the party in December 2023.

== History ==
=== Founding ===
The party was first registered on 13 March 2019 by Jeremy Hosking as Brexit Express. Hoskins intended the party as a possible home for MPs who supported a no-deal Brexit and wished to split from the Conservative Party.

In September 2020, Fox attracted funding for a new political party, provisionally called Reclaim, and dubbed "UKIP for culture". In October 2020, the party changed its leader from Jeremy Hosking to Laurence Fox. It emerged in the same month that the party name had yet to be successfully registered with the Electoral Commission as there was a naming conflict with the "Reclaim Project" of Manchester, an established charity giving opportunities to working-class children. In February 2021, the party changed its registered name from Brexit Express to the Reclaim Party.

In December 2021, newspapers reported that Hosking would continue to fund the Reclaim Party.

=== Parliamentary representation ===
MP Andrew Bridgen was expelled from the Conservative Party in January 2023 for tweeting "As one consultant cardiologist said to me, [the COVID-19 vaccines are] the biggest crime against humanity since the Holocaust", repeating COVID conspiracy claims and for breaching lobbying rules. In May 2023, he joined Reclaim, becoming the party's first MP. He resigned from the party in December 2023.

=== Cooperation agreement with Reform UK ===
On 12 June 2023, Reform UK and the Reclaim Party announced a mutual co-operation agreement for the upcoming by-elections, whereby Reform UK would stand in Mid Bedfordshire and Reclaim would stand in Uxbridge and South Ruislip. Both parties lost all by-elections and lost their deposits, with Dave Kent (Reform) getting the highest support at 3.7% in Selby and Ainsty.

== Platform ==
Described as right wing to far right, the party states a sovereigntist, anti-woke, and anti-gender outlook in its manifesto, as well as a lack of belief that there is a climate crisis.

== Electoral record ==
=== 2021 London mayoral election ===
In March 2021, Fox announced he would stand in the London mayoral elections, to "fight against extreme political correctness" and to "end the Met's obsession with diversity and inclusivity". His candidacy was endorsed by Reform UK, who stood aside for him in the election, and by Nigel Farage. The major source of Fox's campaign funds was Brexit backer Jeremy Hosking, who, in the first quarter of 2021, gave the Reclaim Party more than £1,000,000 in cash and services.

In the mayoral election, Fox finished in sixth place with 47,634 votes (1.9 per cent), losing his £10,000 election deposit.

=== 2021 Scottish Parliament election ===
The party stood one candidate, Leo Kearse, in Glasgow Pollok for the 2021 Scottish Parliament election; he received 114 votes (0.3 per cent), coming in eighth place on the constituency list.

=== 2021 North Shropshire by-election ===
Martin Daubney, deputy leader of the party from 2021 until August 2022, was the party's candidate in the 2021 North Shropshire by-election. Daubney is a former Brexit Party Member of the European Parliament (MEP) from 2019 to 2020, and a former journalist and editor. He finished seventh with 375 votes (0.98 per cent), losing his deposit.

During the by-election campaign, a Market Drayton town councillor defected to Reclaim, becoming the party's first representative in UK local government, but resigned as a councillor less than a year later.

=== 2023 Uxbridge and South Ruislip by-election ===
In June 2023, Fox announced his intention to contest the 2023 Uxbridge and South Ruislip by-election. Reform UK declined to contest the race. Fox received 2.3% of the vote, finishing fourth and losing his deposit.

=== 2024 general election ===
In the 2024 general election, Reclaim announced it would donate £5,000 to each candidate standing for re-election from other parties who agreed to a four-point culture-based pledge: leaving the European Court of Human Rights, repealing the Human Rights Act, banning all forms of gender reassignment for children and reforming the Equality Act to eliminate prohibition of sex- and race-based discrimination. Despite Conservative Party advice not to accept the money, four of its MPs did. Prior to the election, Reclaim had stated it would field its own candidates.

A few days before the election, Reclaim endorsed Reform UK.

The four Conservative MPs, Andrea Jenkyns, Brendan Clarke-Smith, Marco Longhi and Karl McCartney, who had accepted the donation in exchange for backing Reclaim's "four-point commitment to culture", all lost their seats.

=== 2026 Clacton by-election ===
Reclaim resurfaced in July 2026, when Fox announced he would be standing in the following month's Clacton by-election. Of a record 34 candidates, he finished 6th.
