= Journal of Risk Research =

- Discipline: Risk management Communication Judgment Decision-Making
- Language: English
- Edited by: Ragnar E. Lofstedt

Publication details
- History: 1998-present
- Publisher: Routledge
- Frequency: Monthly
- Impact factor: 5.1 (2022)

Standard abbreviations
- ISO 4: J. Risk Res.

Indexing
- ISSN: 1366-9877 (print); 1466-4461 (web)
- LCCN: 98658522
- OCLC no.: 40343417

Links
- Journal homepage; Online access; Online archive

The Journal of Risk Research is a monthly peer-reviewed academic journal covering all aspects of risk analysis, communication, judgment, and decision-making. It was established in 1998 and is published by Routledge. The editor-in-chief is Ragnar Löfstedt (King's College London). It is the official journal of the European and Japanese sections of the Society for Risk Analysis.

== Abstracting and indexing ==
The journal is abstracted and indexed in:

- CAB Abstracts
- Cambridge Scientific Abstracts
- Current Contents/Social & Behavioral Sciences
- EBSCO databases
- Environmental Sciences and Pollution Management
- International Bibliography of the Social Sciences
- PsycINFO
- Scopus
- Social Sciences Citation Index
- Sociological Abstracts
- Worldwide Political Science Abstracts

According to the Journal Citation Reports, the journal has a 2022 impact factor of 5.1.
