= Charlene de Carvalho-Heineken =

Dutch billionaire (born 1954)

- Born: Charlene Lucille Heineken; 30 June 1954 (age 72); Noordwijk, Netherlands
- Education: Rijnlands Lyceum Wassenaar; Leiden University
- Spouse: Michel de Carvalho (m. 1983)
- Children: 5
- Parent(s): Freddy Heineken; Lucille Cummins

Charlene Lucille de Carvalho-Heineken (born 30 June 1954) is a Dutch billionaire businesswoman, and the owner of a 25% controlling interest in the world's second-largest brewer, Heineken N.V. As of July 2024, Forbes estimated her net worth at US$14.1 billion.

== Early life ==
Charlene Heineken was born on 30 June 1954, the daughter of Freddy Heineken, a Dutch industrialist, and Lucille Cummins, an American from a Kentucky family of bourbon whiskey distillers. She was educated at Rijnlands Lyceum Wassenaar, followed by a law degree from Leiden University.

== Career ==
She owns a 25% controlling stake in Dutch brewer Heineken, of which she is also an executive director.

The biannual Heineken Prize for cognitive science is named after her.

== Personal life ==
She married in Perroy in 1983 Michel de Carvalho, a British financier and private banker, director of Citigroup and a former Olympic skier, whom she met on a ski holiday in St. Moritz, Switzerland. They reside in London with their five children, Alexander Alfred Charles de Carvalho (b. London, 9 December 1984), married in London on 26 November 2016 to Stephanie Gräfin und Edle Tochter von und zu Eltz genannt Faust von Stromberg (b. Vienna, 25 February or November 1984), Louisa Lucile H. de Carvalho (b. London, July 1986), married at Cap d'Antibes on 7 October 2017 to Hugo Timothy Brassey (b. 29 July 1982/1988), son of Anthony Hugh Owen Brassey (b. 5 January 1945) and his wife Sarah/Susan Sigri Fuglesang, twins Isabel Catherine C. de Carvalho and Sophie Charlene V. de Carvalho (b. London, November 1987) and Charles Andrew George de Carvalho (b. London, August 1990).

Upon the death of her father in 2002, Charlene inherited about £3 billion, making her the wealthiest person with Dutch citizenship. In 2019, the Sunday Times Rich List ranking of the wealthiest people in the UK named her the wealthiest woman and the 7th overall, with an estimated fortune of £12 billion. Charlene's wealth in 2021 was estimated by Forbes at $16.7 billion making her 116th among the world's billionaires.

== See also ==
- List of Dutch by net worth
