= Sergeant Hathaway =

Fictional character in crime novels by Colin Dexter

James Hathaway
- Laurence Fox as James Hathaway
- First appearance: Reputation (2006, TV)
- Portrayed by: Laurence Fox

In-universe information
- Alias: Jim; Atta-way Hathaway; W.C. (Wolfgang Christ); Boy Bloody Wonder
- Title: Detective Inspector (DI)
- Occupation: Police Detective in Oxfordshire CID
- Family: Phillip N Hathaway (father); Nell Hathaway (sister)
- Nationality: British

James Hathaway is the fictional CID Detective Inspector working with Inspector Lewis in the ITV television series Lewis (known as Inspector Lewis in the United States). He is played by Laurence Fox. Hathaway holds the rank of Detective Sergeant until the penultimate series of Lewis in 2014, in which he is promoted to the rank of Inspector following a brief break from the police.

== Biography ==
=== Childhood and family ===
Hathaway grew up at "Crevecoeur Hall", an Oxford estate where his father Philip was estate manager ("The Dead of Winter"). Hathaway attended Cambridge and is a former Catholic seminarian. In the episode "Wild Justice", Hathaway is offered a junior lectureship in theology. He expresses some interest in taking up teaching if Lewis were to retire.

In the first episode of series 3 there is slight reference to Hathaway's childhood. When his father is mentioned he becomes rather irritable and changes the subject rather quickly. In the first episode of series 4 it is mentioned that Hathaway's father was the estate manager at the estate of a lord and that Hathaway used to play with the other children who lived at the estate. Later in the episode it is revealed that the Lord of the manor has been systematically abusing young children living on the estate but whether or not Hathaway has been one of his victims or has been aware of what went on is not discussed.

In the same Lewis episode Lewis and Hathaway deal with a difficult case involving a complex family relationship. The eventual outcome is difficult for Hathaway to digest, leading to conjecture that he may himself have some experience in the subject matter. This links back to "Life born of Fire", where Jonjo, a former friend of Hathaway's, asserts his friend is not happy with his life. Something in Hathaway is always questioning his desires with his duties.

Season nine introduces Hathaway's family properly. We meet his father Philip who is suffering from dementia and his sister Nell with whom James has a tense relationship. It is also revealed that Hathaway's mother has been dead since before the show started. Hathaway's relationship with his family is fraught but Lewis serves as a link helping him to at least partially connect with his ailing father as they go fishing together and Lewis encourages James to allow himself to hold his father's hand even though this is not how they usually express their emotions.

We meet Philip Hathaway in the prequel show Endeavour (series 3, episode 3), where a young Philip is introduced as a groundsman at the same Crevecoeur estate. It throws light on his father's passion for fishing, as that would have been a groundsman's way to relax on a huge estate.

=== Education ===
Hathaway, like Inspector Morse, Lewis' old boss from his days as a Detective Sergeant, is cerebral. Unlike Morse, Hathaway trained in Theology, and was a rather successful athlete, as his nickname 'Atta-way Hathaway' (revealed by a rival coach at Oxford) would attest, being a rowing star while at Cambridge. In the last episode of series 5 Hathaway informs Lewis that he was talent spotted for MI5 in university; this is neither confirmed nor denied by the end.

In "The Soul of Genius", the first episode of series 6, it is hinted that Hathaway is well known in the Oxford theology faculty. Rev. Conor Hawes shows interest in Hathaway after he makes a comment on the subject he is discussing with Lewis, asking with a curious look, "What did you say your name was?" To which Hathaway replies, "Detective Sergeant Hathaway" with some coldness in his tone.

He subsequently trained for the priesthood in Cambridge and entered the seminary. He later left the seminary guilty over the orthodox but ultimately deadly advice he gave a gay friend about coping with his homosexuality. This was detailed in the third episode of the second series ("Life Born of Fire"), unlike Lewis, Hathaway's guilt at sharing the homophobic attitudes of some of his fellow trainees is revealed when he discovers that a suicide he is investigating is a former friend, Will McEwan, who broke off his friendship with him when Hathaway urged him to reject his homosexuality and that he would be punished by God for it. Hathaway acknowledges that he was blinded by religion and did not realize how he hurt Will.

In the episode "Old School Ties" we are told by an ex-schoolmate of Hathaway's that he had been Head Boy of his "posh" school and nicknamed 'W.C.' - short for 'Wolfgang Christ' - because he "didn't know whether he wanted to be Mozart or Jesus". Hathaway enjoys playing music and is first seen playing an acoustic guitar with a group in the Series 1 episode "Old School Ties." At the beginning of the episode "Your Sudden Death Question," he gets ready to head to a festival of world music, toting his guitar, a Gibson L-5, which he refers to as "she." Later on in the episode, it's revealed that the guitar is worth over three thousand pounds.

=== As a police officer ===
Hathaway has been described as "chain-smoking, moody and emotionally buttoned-up", a "dry humoured intellectual". Hathaway's "deep thinking and erudite approach" complements Lewis's instincts and experience. Russell Lewis, who has written for Inspector Morse, Lewis and Endeavour, indicated that the letters THAW in the Sergeant's surname were a tribute to late actor John Thaw who played Inspector Morse. In the pilot episode, Hathaway is at first, sergeant to DI Charles Knox. Knox is shown taking a breathalyzer test and is subsequently placed on suspension. Lewis is assigned to take his place.

=== Romantic life ===
In "The Point of Vanishing", it is disclosed that Hathaway and DS (now Inspector) Fiona McKendrick were romantically involved for some period of time.

In "Life Born of Fire", there are hints that Hathaway may have had a close relationship with or a romantic interest in one of the male characters (Jonjo Read) but this is never made explicit. There is a strong implication that Hathaway may be bisexual - he refuses to directly answer Lewis's question as to whether or not he is gay, and berates Lewis for drawing a "neat dividing line" between heterosexuals who "read Loaded and eat Yorkie bars" and homosexuals who like shoes and musicals. In the final scene of the episode, Lewis joins Hathaway, who starts reading a copy of Loaded and hands Lewis a Yorkie bar.

In "The Dead of Winter", Hathaway appears to become romantically involved with a woman from his early teenage years (by going out on a date and then leaving her flat the next morning) who may or may not be suspect in a murder investigation. Lewis suspends him from the investigation fearing Hathaway crossed an ethical line. At the end of the episode Hathaway says he's going to resign. Lewis turns him down and tells him, "Between us, we make a not-bad detective. I'm the brains, obviously."

"The Soul of Genius", the first episode of series 6, highlights Hathaway's awkwardness with women, with him being so nervous while talking to one that he ends up bowing to her, to which she replies with an exaggerated curtsy.

It's deliberately left open with multiple opportunities as to fan theories for viewers to decide for themselves on Hathaway's sexuality, although it's never formally defined. Apart from certain episodes featuring obvious references to Hathaway's possible sexuality, Lewis doesn't seem to mind what Hathaway's sexuality may be.

== Function in the series ==
"Hathaway, the image of the mature, educated, even sophisticated postmodern believer, holds his faith a closely guarded secret. However, when he gives evidence in court in "The Dead of Winter", he makes an affirmation that his evidence is true, rather than taking a religious oath, thus suggesting some uncertainty in his faith. The series requires that he share theological trivia, translate Latin and Greek ... The most viewers know about him is that he left the seminary guilty over the orthodox but ultimately deadly advice he gave a gay friend about coping with his homosexuality."
