= The Tin Star =

1957 American Western film by Anthony Mann

- Theatrical release poster
- Directed by: Anthony Mann
- Screenplay by: Dudley Nichols
- Story by: Barney Slater; Joel Kane
- Produced by: William Perlberg; George Seaton
- Starring: Henry Fonda; Anthony Perkins
- Cinematography: Loyal Griggs
- Edited by: Alma Macrorie
- Music by: Elmer Bernstein
- Distributed by: Paramount Pictures
- Release date: October 23, 1957
- Running time: 93 minutes
- Country: United States
- Language: English
- Box office: $1.4 million (US rentals)

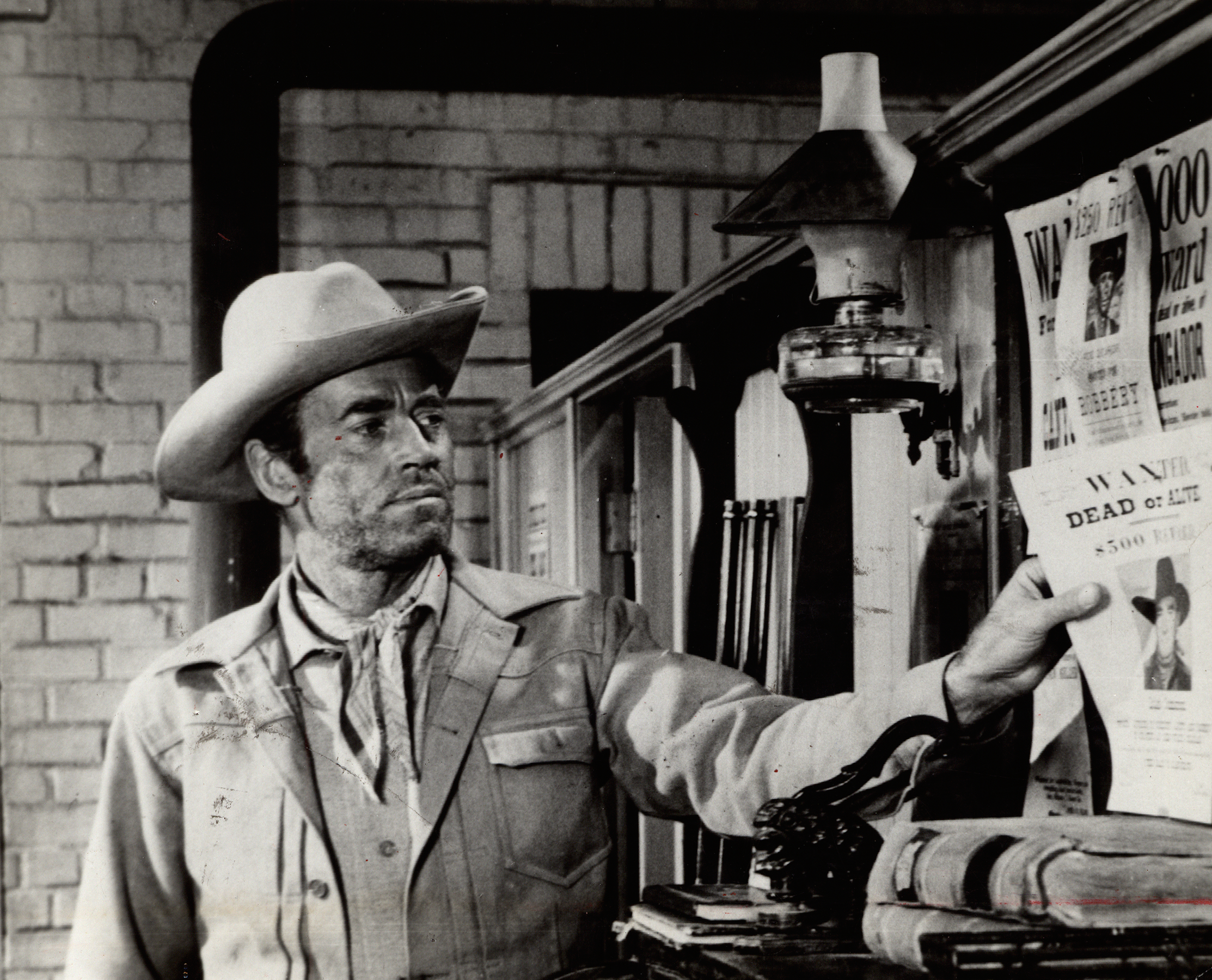
Henry Fonda

The Tin Star is a 1957 American Western film based on a short story, directed in VistaVision by Anthony Mann and starring Henry Fonda and Anthony Perkins, in one of Perkins' first roles. The film became one of the few low-budget Westerns to be nominated for the Oscar for Best Writing, Story or Screenplay. Since its release, the film has become one of the classics of the genre. The supporting cast features Betsy Palmer, Neville Brand, John McIntire, and Lee Van Cleef.

== Plot ==
Bounty hunter Morgan "Morg" Hickman arrives in a small town with the body of an outlaw, seeking the bounty. While the general townsfolk openly abhor Morg, young sheriff Ben Owens, while angry with Morg for not bringing the wanted man in alive, also admires him for taking everything in his stride and knowing how to handle dangerous situations.

Owens has a steady girl called Millie. Her father, the previous sheriff, was killed, and she refuses to marry Owens unless he quits the job. Owens enjoys the authority and wants to prove himself; he asks Morg to give him some lessons to gain confidence, particularly because he is going to have to face up to the town loudmouth, Bogardus. Morg tells the young man that he was once a sheriff himself until a personal loss changed him. He advises Owens to quit and marry his girl, but eventually agrees to provide some advice while awaiting the arrival of the bounty money.

Due to the community's open hostility toward Morg, he cannot find a place to stay. He befriends Nona Mayfield, whose own relationship with most of the citizens has been tense due to her half-Indian son, Kip. Morg moves into a room in her house on the edge of town.

Matters come to a head after local doctor McCord is murdered. After delivering a baby son to a remote homesteader, McCord is returning home during the night, but is waylaid by Ed McGaffey, who demands that the doctor treat his brother's gunshot wound, received when the brothers attacked a stagecoach, killing the guard. After McCord treats the brother, McGaffey decides to kill him because apparently, the doctor would soon put two and two together and know the two are responsible for the murder.

Dr. McCord's horse and trap re-enter the town on McCord Day; everyone has come out to celebrate the doctor's 75th birthday, offering up a resounding chorus of "For He's a Jolly Good Fellow". It is soon obvious that the doctor is dead. A posse is then assembled to catch the McGaffey brothers. However, the posse splits from Owens – they see him as too soft for insisting the men be brought in alive – and the dangerous Bogardus becomes their leader.

Young Kip, fascinated by the posse as they pass his house, rides out after them on the horse Morg has given him as a present. When Morg discovers this, he spurns Owens' pleas to join him in tracking the killers and sets off to find the boy. Owens eventually joins him.

When they find Kip, they also stumble upon the brothers hiding in a mountain cave. After a gunfight in which Owens receives a bullet graze on the forehead, and a clever ploy by Morg, they successfully capture the brothers and lock them in the town jail. The posse, urged on by Bogardus, is baying for blood and wants to lynch the pair. To build the courage to complete the deed, the men get drunk in the saloon.

Owens, demonstrating the newfound confidence and strength he has gleaned from Morg, stands against the crowd with a shotgun to defend the McGaffeys' right to a legal trial. Bogardus makes it clear he will face down the sheriff; Owens approaches the man alone after handing the shotgun to the newly deputized Morg. The mob separates, anticipating a gunfight. Owens confronts Bogardus and slaps him. This seems to take the wind out of the troublemaker, and he turns away, appearing to back down. After a few steps, though, he turns and draws. Owens guns him down. At this point, the lynch mob disperses.

Owens and Millie, who has decided she will subdue her fear as best she can and marry him, bid goodbye to Morg, who is happily leaving town with Nona and Kip.

== Cast ==
- Henry Fonda as Morgan Hickman
- Anthony Perkins as Sheriff Ben Owens
- Betsy Palmer as Nona Mayfield
- Michel Ray as Kip Mayfield
- Neville Brand as Bart Bogardus
- John McIntire as Dr Joseph J. 'Doc' McCord
- Mary Webster as Millie Parker
- Lee Van Cleef as Ed McGaffey
- Peter Baldwin as Zeke McGaffey
- Richard Shannon as Buck Henderson
- Howard Petrie as Mayor Harvey King
- Frank Cady as Abe Pickett (uncredited)
- Frank McGrath as Jim Clark, the stagecoach driver (uncredited)

== Production ==
Anthony Mann called it "…a fair film. Again, there was too much supervision. I really believe that in order to create a good film one has to do it completely on one’s own. The picture may not be a success even then, but it stands a greater chance if you leave the artistic endeavour to the director."

== Reception ==
The Tin Star holds an 89% rating on Rotten Tomatoes based on nine reviews.

== See also ==
- List of American films of 1957
