= Lewis (TV series) =

British television detective series (2006–2015)

- Cover of the DVD of the first series
- Also known as: Inspector Lewis
- Genre: Crime drama
- Created by: Colin Dexter
- Developed by: Chris Burt; Stephen Churchett
- Starring: Kevin Whately; Laurence Fox; Rebecca Front; Clare Holman; Angela Griffin; Steve Toussaint
- Composer: Barrington Pheloung
- Country of origin: United Kingdom
- Original language: English
- No. of series: 9
- No. of episodes: 33 (list of episodes)

Production
- Executive producers: Michele Buck; Damien Timmer; Ted Childs (series 1 only)
- Producer: Chris Burt
- Production locations: Oxford, England
- Running time: 93 minutes (pilot – series 3); 89 minutes (series 4–6); 45 minutes (series 7–9)

Original release
- Network: ITV
- Release: 29 January 2006 – 10 November 2015

Related
- Inspector Morse; Endeavour

Lewis is a British television detective drama produced for ITV, first airing in 2006 (pilot) then 2007 (series 1). It is a spin-off from Inspector Morse and, like that series, it is set in Oxford. Kevin Whately reprises his character Robert "Robbie" Lewis, who was Morse's sergeant in the original series. Lewis has now been promoted to detective inspector and is assisted by DS James Hathaway, portrayed by Laurence Fox, who was promoted to inspector before the eighth series. The series also stars Clare Holman as forensic pathologist Dr. Laura Hobson, likewise reprising her role from Inspector Morse; and, from the eighth series, Angela Griffin as DS Lizzie Maddox.

On 2 November 2015, ITV announced that the show would end after its ninth series, following the decision made by Kevin Whately and Laurence Fox to retire from their roles in the series. Whately announced that the show had gone on long enough, with his character having done many stories between Morse and Lewis after he took on the role 30 years earlier.

== Cast ==
- Kevin Whately as Detective Inspector Robert Lewis: Widowed after his wife was killed in a hit-and-run car collision, Inspector Lewis is a workaholic. He often shows an uncanny intuition in solving murder cases. He is the father of two children. His daughter Lynn is portrayed as married and as having a baby. He develops a relationship with Dr. Laura Hobson.
- Laurence Fox as Detective Sergeant James Hathaway: James Hathaway is a very private person, often hiding his feelings or past from Lewis, even when it is relevant to a murder investigation, although early in the first season he mentioned that he studied to be a priest before deciding to become a police officer.
- Clare Holman as Dr. Laura Hobson: Romantic tensions simmer between forensic pathologist Dr. Hobson and Lewis throughout the series. Hobson is single and childless, and like Lewis and Hathaway, is dedicated to her job to a point that it interrupts many of her personal plans. At the end of the episode "Counter Culture Blues", there is a hint that Hathaway senses a relationship forming between her and Lewis, as he detaches himself from them as they go for a drink together. In the episode "Your Sudden Death Question" Lewis has to cancel arrangements they had made for an operatic weekend away together (with separate rooms). She and Lewis become a couple during the seventh (US sixth) season.
- Rebecca Front as Chief Superintendent Jean Innocent (2006–2014): She is the senior officer supervising Lewis and Hathaway. When Lewis returned from his overseas secondment, Innocent was not convinced that he would be of value, but he proved himself to her on his first case. Innocent is frequently at odds with Lewis over his investigation style. In Series 9, it is revealed that she has gone to work for Suffolk Constabulary.
- Angela Griffin as Detective Sergeant Elizabeth "Lizzie" Maddox (2014–2015): She becomes Hathaway's DS, following his promotion to detective inspector.
- Steve Toussaint as Chief Superintendent Joseph Moody (2015): He arrives at Oxfordshire Police as the new chief superintendent, replacing Innocent. He soon clashes with Lewis over the latter's more traditional approach to detective work.

== Production ==
Colin Dexter, the author of the Inspector Morse novels, makes a very brief cameo appearance in several episodes, including one as a porter at Wadham College. The episode scripts follow Dexter's approach, but each of them is credited to one of several other writers including, most frequently, Russell Lewis, Alan Plater, and Stephen Churchett.

The music for the series was composed by Barrington Pheloung, who created the music for the original Inspector Morse series.

Following the broadcast of a pilot in 2006, the show's first series was commissioned by ITV, consisting of three episodes that were broadcast between February and March 2007. Following this, further series were commissioned, each with four episodes—the second series was broadcast in 2008 from 24 February to 16 March, the third series in 2009 from 22 March to 12 April, the fourth series was aired in 2010 throughout May, the fifth series was aired throughout April during 2011, and the sixth series was broadcast in 2012 from 16 May to 6 June. During May of that same year, after the show was renewed for a seventh series, Fox made a statement it would be the show's last, as both he and Whately wished to move on to other things. The seventh series was broadcast during 2013 from 7 January to 11 February, and consisted of three two-part stories.

On 10 February 2014, an official announcement was made that the show was to return, with all four original main cast members coming back to do another series. The eighth series consisted of three two-part episodes, with shooting beginning in March 2014. It was broadcast that same year, from 10 October to 14 November. Later that year, on 21 November, Whately announced on BBC Radio Oxford that a ninth series would be made, with shooting occurring on 2015 between May and June. This was also confirmed by Griffin on BBC Radio 2, and then by Fox in March 2015 during an interview with the Evening Standard. On 8 April 2015, ITV officially commissioned a ninth series of Lewis.

On 30 September 2014, Whately revealed in an interview with the Radio Times that the ninth series would be his last, having felt that he had played the character long enough for the past 30 years. His decision to leave, along with Fox's, was officially announced by ITV on 2 November 2015, with the network revealing the ninth series of Lewis would be its last.

=== Locations ===
The majority of the series is filmed in and around Oxford. Some scenes are also filmed at Brunel University and parts of Ealing.

== Overseas broadcasting ==
PBS broadcast the series as Inspector Lewis in the United States and Canada, as part of its Masterpiece Mystery series. In the United States, all episodes of Lewis were originally shown as Inspector Lewis on Masterpiece Mystery! on PBS, except for the pilot, which was shown on the earlier series Mystery! in 2006. The numbering of the episodes on PBS is slightly different from those on ITV. Series 1 was broadcast as Season 1 in 2008. However, all of series 2 and episodes 1–3 of series 3 were broadcast as Season 2 in 2009. Episode 4 of series 3 and all of series 4 were broadcast as Season 3 in 2010. Series 5, 6, 7 and 8 were shown as Seasons 4, 5, 6 and 7 in 2011–2014. Series 9 was broadcast as "Season 8" in August 2016.

In France, the series is broadcast as Inspecteur Lewis. Public service broadcaster France 3 started airing it in 2009; nowadays, C8 broadcasts repeats.

== Episodes ==
There were 33 episodes produced and screened, identical in quantity with the preceding Morse series.

== Ratings ==
Date	Episode	Viewers (millions)
Pilot
29 January 2006	"Reputation"	11.31
Series 1
18 February 2007	"Whom the Gods Would Destroy"	8.11
25 February 2007	"Old School Ties"	7.81
4 March 2007	"Expiation"	8.85
Series 2
24 February 2008	"And the Moonbeams Kiss the Sea"	8.90
2 March 2008	"Music To Die For"	8.50
9 March 2008	"Life Born of Fire"	8.19
16 March 2008	"The Great and the Good"	8.70
Series 3
22 March 2009	"Allegory of Love"	7.54
29 March 2009	"The Quality of Mercy"	7.19
5 April 2009	"The Point of Vanishing"	6.83
12 April 2009	"Counter Culture Blues"	6.61
Series 4
2 May 2010	"The Dead of Winter"	8.70 (Note: 8.46 million on ITV1, and 240,000 on the ITV1 HD simulcast)
9 May 2010	"Dark Matter"	8.23 (Note: 8.03 million on ITV, and 198,000 on the ITV1 HD simulcast)
16 May 2010	"Your Sudden Death Question"	7.29 (Note: 7.17 million on ITV, and 119,000 on the ITV1 HD simulcast)
30 May 2010	"Falling Darkness"	7.10 (Note: 6.90 million on ITV, and 207,000 on the ITV1 HD simulcast)
Series 5
3 April 2011	"Old, Unhappy, Far Off Things"	7.38 (Note: Series 5 figures include ITV, ITV HD and ITV+1)
10 April 2011	"Wild Justice"	6.69
17 April 2011	"The Mind Has Mountains"	7.12
24 April 2011	"The Gift of Promise"	6.62
Series 6
16 May 2012	"The Soul of Genius"	6.94 (Note: Series 6 figures include ITV, ITV HD and ITV+1)
23 May 2012	"Generation of Vipers"	6.46
30 May 2012	"Fearful Symmetry"	6.48
6 June 2012	"The Indelible Stain"	6.64
Series 7
7 January 2013	"Down Among the Fearful" – Part 1	8.21
14 January 2013	"Down Among the Fearful" – Part 2	8.09
21 January 2013	"The Ramblin' Boy" – Part 1	7.67
28 January 2013	"The Ramblin' Boy" – Part 2	8.21
4 February 2013	"Intelligent Design" – Part 1	7.58
11 February 2013	"Intelligent Design" – Part 2	7.90
Series 8
10 October 2014	"Entry Wounds" – Part 1	7.01
17 October 2014	"Entry Wounds" – Part 2	6.41
24 October 2014	"The Lions of Nemea" – Part 1	5.95
31 October 2014	"The Lions of Nemea" – Part 2	6.31
7 November 2014	"Beyond Good and Evil" – Part 1	5.75
14 November 2014	"Beyond Good and Evil" – Part 2	4.80
Series 9
6 October 2015	"One for Sorrow" – Part 1	6.38
13 October 2015	"One for Sorrow" – Part 2	5.97
20 October 2015	"Magnum Opus" – Part 1	5.31
27 October 2015	"Magnum Opus" – Part 2	5.66
3 November 2015	"What Lies Tangled" – Part 1	5.44
10 November 2015	"What Lies Tangled" – Part 2	6.23
