= Sunday Times Rich List 2019 =

The Sunday Times Rich List 2019 is the 31st annual survey of the wealthiest people resident in the United Kingdom, published by The Sunday Times on 12 May 2019.

The list was edited by Robert Watts who succeeded long-term compiler Philip Beresford in 2017.

The list was previewed in the previous week's Sunday Times and widely reported by other media.

== Top 15 fortunes ==
2019		Name	Citizenship	Source of wealth	2018	
Rank	Net worth £ bn	Name	Citizenship	Source of wealth	Rank	Net worth £ bn
01 ▲	£22.00 ▲	Sri and Gopi Hinduja	India	Industry and finance	2	£20.64
02 ▲	£18.66 ▲	David and Simon Reuben	United Kingdom	Property and Internet	4	£15.09
03 ▼	£18.15 ▼	Sir Jim Ratcliffe	United Kingdom	Industry (Ineos)	1	£21.05
04 ▼	£14.37 ▼	Sir Len Blavatnik	United States & United Kingdom	Investment, music and media	3	£15.26
05 ▲	£12.60 ▲	Sir James Dyson and family	United Kingdom	Industry (Dyson)	12	£9.50
06 ▲	£12.26 ▲	Kirsten Rausing and Jörn Rausing	Sweden	Inheritance and investment (Tetra Pak)	7	£10.85
07 ▼	£12.00 ▲	Charlene de Carvalho-Heineken and Michel de Carvalho	Netherlands	Inheritance, banking, brewing (Heineken)	6	£11.10
08	£11.34 ▲	Alisher Usmanov	Russia	Mining and investment	8	£10.56
09 ▲	11.22 ▲	Roman Abramovich	Russia & Israel	Oil and industry	13	£9.33
10	£10.90	Mikhail Fridman	Russia & Israel	Banking	13	£10.90
11 ▼	£10.67 ▼	Lakshmi Mittal and family	India	Steel	5	£14.66
12 ▲	£10.57 ▲	Anil Agarwal	India	Mining	74	£1.85
13 ▼	£10.50 ▲	Guy Weston, Galen Weston Jr., George G. Weston and family	Canada & United Kingdom	Retailing	9	£10.05
14 ▼	£10.10 ▲	The 7th Duke of Westminster and Grosvenor family	United Kingdom	Inheritance and property	10	£9.96
15 ▼	£9.71 ▲	Ernesto and Kirsty Bertarelli	Switzerland & United Kingdom	Pharmaceuticals	11	£9.66

== See also ==
- Forbes list of billionaires
