= Michel de Carvalho =

British sportsperson and actor (born 1944)

- Born: Michel Ray Popper; 21 July 1944 (age 82); Gerrards Cross, Buckinghamshire
- Years active: 1954-1964
- Spouse: Charlene Heineken (m. 1983)
- Children: 5

Michel Ray de Carvalho (born Michel Ray Popper; 21 July 1944) is a British financier, private banker, former Olympic skier and luger, and former child actor in films such as The Brave One, The Tin Star, and Lawrence of Arabia (under the name Michel Ray).

== Early life ==
He was born Michel Ray Popper in Gerrards Cross, Buckinghamshire, on 21 July 1944. Using the stage-name 'Michel Ray', he appeared in several films as a child and teenager, including the 1962 epic film Lawrence of Arabia (where he played the character Farraj, Lawrence's personal servant), The Divided Heart in 1954, The Tin Star with Henry Fonda and Anthony Perkins in 1957, and The Brave One in 1956 where he plays a young Mexican boy who tries to rescue his pet bull from being killed by a champion bullfighter.

He quit acting to attend Harvard University, which he later described as "just about the most stupid decision" he ever made. Nevertheless, de Carvalho graduated from Harvard and then earned an MBA degree from the same university.

De Carvalho represented Great Britain at the 1968 Winter Olympics in skiing, and luge at the 1972 and 1976 Winter Olympics. In May 2013 he was named President of British Skeleton.

== Career ==
De Carvalho was the vice-chairman of investment banking at Citigroup, where he chaired Citi Private Bank in the EMEA (Europe, Middle East and Africa) region, a post to which he was appointed in November 2009.

He worked previously at HBS, Credit Suisse and Nikko Securities.

On 23 April 2015 he became the Executive Director at Heineken Holding N.V., but remains active as board member or director of several other business ventures.

In 2018 Carvalho was appointed chairman of CapGen.

== Personal life ==
He married Dutch Heineken heiress Charlene Heineken in Perroy in 1983. In 2002 Charlene inherited a fortune of £3 billion ($4.8bn) upon the death of her father, Freddy Heineken. They have five children (two sons and three daughters, including twins, born between 1984 and 1991).

== Partial filmography ==
- The Divided Heart (1954) - Toni
- The Brave One (1956) - Leonardo
- The Tin Star (1957) - Kip Mayfield
- Flood Tide (1957) - David Gordon
- The Space Children (1958) - Bud Brewster
- The Naked City (TV series) (S1.E26) (1959) - Felipe
- Lawrence of Arabia (1962) - Farraj

== Bibliography ==
- Holmstrom, John. The Moving Picture Boy: An International Encyclopaedia from 1895 to 1995, Norwich, Michael Russell, 1996, p. 248.
