= Nevena Bridgen =

Serbian opera singer and blogger

- Occupations: Blogger; opera singer
- Spouse: Andrew Bridgen (m. 2017; sep. 2024)
- Children: 1
- Website: https://nevenabridgen.com/

Nevena Bridgen (née Pavlović; born c. 1979) is a Serbian opera singer and blogger. She founded The Wives of Westminster, a blog about British political wives. Bridgen and her work has been featured in The Times, The Guardian, i, The Independent, Vice and other publications.

Nevena Pavlović was born in Belgrade. She studied singing at the University of Arts in Belgrade. She received Master of Music degree from the Guildhall School of Music and Drama in London. She has been a resident soloist of the National Theatre in Belgrade since 2015.

She married Andrew Bridgen, the former Member of Parliament (MP) for North West Leicestershire, in 2017. In 2024 she said that her husband had left her and their young son after being radicalised by an "antivax cult".
