= Ragnar Löfstedt =

Ragnar E. Löfstedt
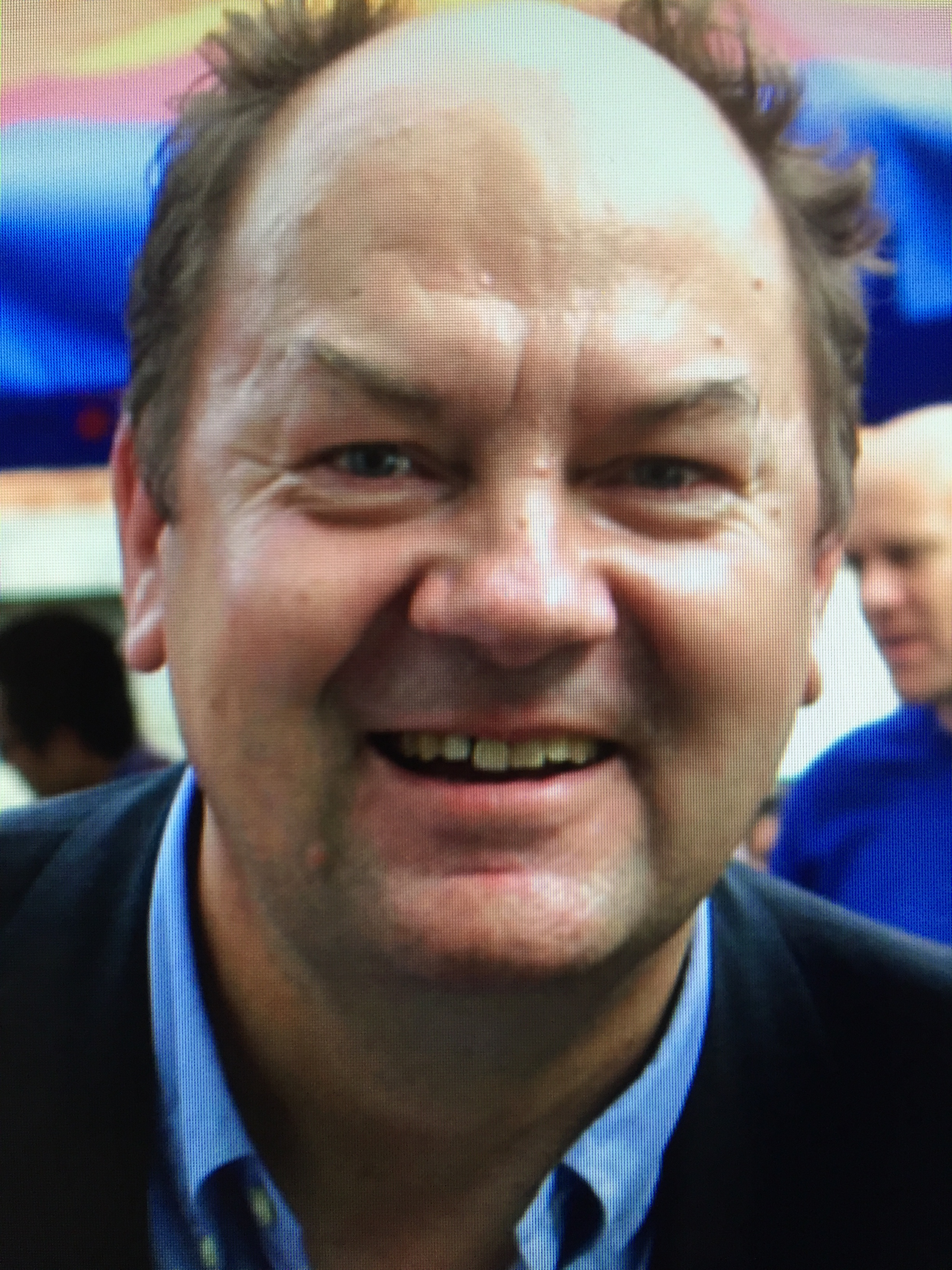
- Education: UCLA; Clark University
- Known for: Risk Analysis; Risk Assessment; Risk perception The Löfstedt Report on occupational safety and health
- Awards: Chauncey Starr award
- Scientific career
- Fields: Risk, Geography
- Workplaces: King's College London; Harvard University; Carnegie Mellon University; University of Gothenburg; University of Surrey

Ragnar E. Löfstedt (born 1964) is the Professor of Risk Management at King's College London and the Director of King's Centre for Risk Management and is the President-Elect (2022) of Society for Risk Analysis.

== Background ==
Löfstedt grew up in Los Angeles to parents who were professors of medieval languages. With Swedish and American nationality, he is also fluent in German. He worked as a lumberjack on the family farm in Sweden before attending UCLA. He has a doctorate from the Graduate School of Geography, Clark University, studying with Roger Kasperson (1988-1993).

Löfstedt teaches risk analysis at King's College London. Prior to this, he was a reader at the Centre for Environmental Strategy, University of Surrey where he worked with University of California at Berkeley academic David Vogel. Löfstedt also holds adjunct faculty status at Carnegie Mellon university in the US and Gothenburg in Sweden. He was at one time adjunct faculty at the Harvard Center for Risk Analysis where he teaches an executive education course.

=== Personal life ===
He and his family reside in Surrey. Löfstedt also owns 900 acres of forest in his native Sweden.

== Contributions ==
He has worked mainly on risk communication and management. Studies have included renewable energy policy, transboundary environmental issues (acid rain and nuclear power), health and safety, telecommunications, biosafety, pharmaceuticals, the siting of waste incinerators, fuel policy, nuclear waste installations and railways. He aim is to strengthen proactive risk communication, arguing that high regulatory/industry trust results in low public perceived risk.

Professor Löfstedt was appointed by the UK Coalition Government to look at occupational safety and health and in particular, the bureaucracy faced by those self-employed whose work activities do not pose a risk to others. The review, officially entitled Reclaiming Health and Safety For All but often referred to as the Löfstedt Report, was published by the Department for Work and Pensions in 2011.

Most of his books are edited volumes in the Earthscan Risk Society and Policy series, which he edits. He is currently the editor-in-chief of the Journal of Risk Research.

== Recognition ==
- Chauncey Starr Award for exceptional contributions to the field of risk analysis under the age of 40, Society for Risk Analysis (2000)
- Fellow of the Society for Risk Analysis (SRA) (2005)
- Outstanding Service Award, Society for Risk Analysis (2006)

== Publications ==
- Collier, U, and Löfstedt, R.E. (eds.). 2013. Cases in Climate Change Policy. Political Reality in the European Union. London: Earthscan.
- Löfstedt, R.E. 2011. Reclaiming health and safety for all: an independent review of health and safety legislation. London: Stationery Office. (Cm; vol. 8219)
- Löfstedt R.E. and Boholm A. (eds.). 2009. The Earthscan Reader on Risk. London: Earthscan.
- Löfstedt, R.E. 2005. Risk Management in Post-Trust Societies. London: Palgrave Macmillan.
- Boholm A. and R.E. Löfstedt (eds.). 2004. Facility Siting: Risk, Power and Identity in Land Use Planning. London: Earthscan.
- Linnerooth-Bayer, J., Löfstedt, R.E. & G. Sjostedt. (eds.) 2001. Transboundary Risk Management. London: Earthscan.
- Cvetkovich G. and R.E. Löfstedt (eds.). 1999. Social Trust and the Management of Risk. London: Earthscan.
- Löfstedt, R.E. and L. Frewer (eds.). 1997. The Earthscan Reader in Risk and Modern Society. London: Earthscan.
- Löftstedt, R.E. and Gunnar Sjöstedt (eds.). 1996. Environmental Aid Programmes to Eastern Europe: Area Studies and Theoretical Applications. Avebury Press. Studies in Green Research.
- Löftstedt, R.E. 1993. Dilemmas of Swedish Energy Policy: Implications for International Policymakers. Avebury Press.

== See also ==
- King's College London
- Society for Risk Analysis
