= Andrew Bridgen =

British politician (born 1964)

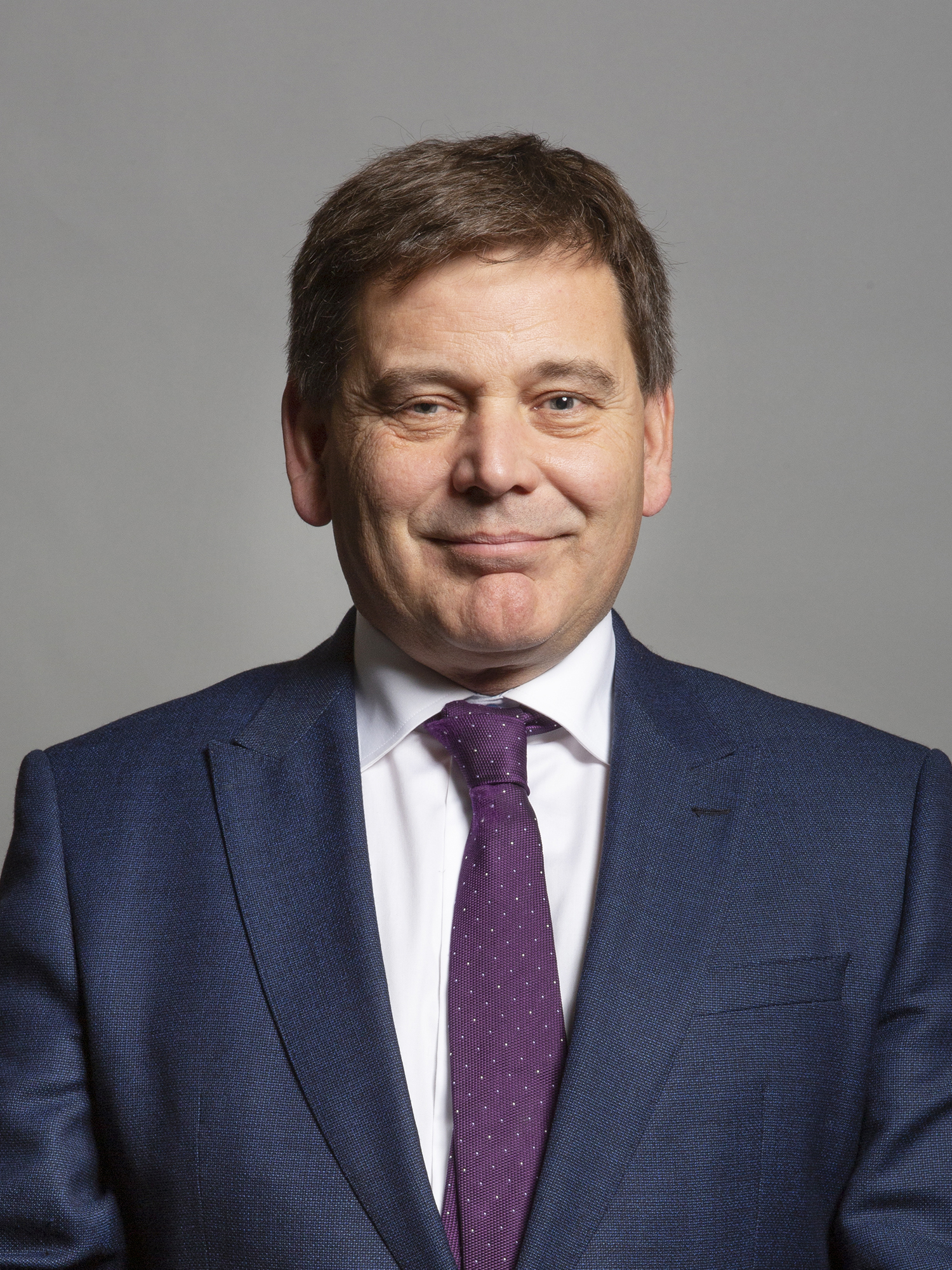
- Official portrait, 2019

Member of Parliament for North West Leicestershire
- In office 6 May 2010 – 30 May 2024
- Preceded by: David Taylor
- Succeeded by: Amanda Hack

Personal details
- Born: 28 October 1964 (age 61) Burton upon Trent, Staffordshire, England
- Party: Restore Britain (since 2026)
- Other political affiliations: Conservative (1981–2023); Reclaim (May–December 2023); Independent (2023–2026)
- Spouses: Jacqueline Cremin (m. 2000; div. 2012) Nevena Pavlovic (m. 2017; sep. 2024)
- Children: 3
- Education: University of Nottingham
- Occupation: Politician; businessman
- Website: Website

Andrew James Bridgen (born 28 October 1964) is a British former politician who served as Member of Parliament (MP) for North West Leicestershire from 2010 until 2024. He was a member of the Conservative Party until his expulsion in April 2023, having had the whip suspended in January after criticising the efficacy of COVID-19 vaccines and saying that a cardiologist told him it constitutes "the biggest crime against humanity since the Holocaust". He was a member of the Reclaim Party in 2023 and joined Restore Britain in 2026.

During his parliamentary career, Bridgen supported Brexit and efforts to remove Conservative prime ministers David Cameron, Theresa May, Boris Johnson, and Liz Truss from office. In January 2023, Bridgen was suspended from the House of Commons for five days after the house voted in favour of the recommendations of the Commons Select Committee on Standards, which found that he had repeatedly breached rules over paid lobbying and declaring interests, and that he also attempted to pressure the commissioner investigating his lobbying breaches.

After leaving the Reclaim Party in December 2023, Bridgen sat as an independent MP for the rest of the term of the 2019 Parliament, announcing his decision to run as an independent for his constituency of North West Leicestershire at the 2024 United Kingdom general election, where he lost his seat and deposit.

== Early life and career ==
Andrew Bridgen was born in Burton upon Trent, Staffordshire, on 28 October 1964. He attended Netherseal Junior School, then Pingle School in Swadlincote. He graduated from the University of Nottingham with a degree in biological sciences.

After graduating, Bridgen began training as an officer in the Royal Marines but did not complete the course. He then began work in his family's agricultural business. He served as the East Midlands chairman of the Institute of Directors and on the East Midlands Regional Assembly as a business representative.

In May 2009, he intervened in the "dirty tricks row" involving a councillor who had offered Conservative backing to ensure a village hall was built if an independent election candidate stood down. Bridgen blamed "intransigence of certain unelected individuals at the very top of the county council" rather than the individual councillors involved. Both Labour and Conservative council leaders criticised his intervention and the council solicitor wrote to ask for an explanation. A police investigation followed, and Cllr Nicholas Rushton temporarily stood down. Rushton denied wrongdoing and went on to become leader of the county council.

== Parliamentary career ==
Bridgen was elected as the Conservative MP for North West Leicestershire at the 2010 general election with 44.6% of the vote and a majority of 7,511.

In July 2010, Bridgen became a member of the Regulatory Reform Select Committee, continuing to be a member throughout his parliamentary career. He was a member of the Advisory Panel to Professor Ragnar Löfstedt's report on Health and Safety and served on the Draft Deregulation Bill (Joint Committee) and Liaison Committee (Commons).

On 9 June 2011, allegations of sexual assault were made against Bridgen, leading to his arrest in London by the Metropolitan Police and subsequent release on bail. A week later the allegations were retracted as untrue, and police said no further action would be taken against Bridgen, or the woman concerned, Annabelle Fuller, a former employee of UKIP. In a statement, Bridgen expressed his frustration that "such a ludicrous, false and unsubstantiated allegation" had received so much attention.

In January 2013, Bridgen, interviewed on BBC Radio's PM programme, stated that good MPs were being put off by poor pay and were having to ask their families to make sacrifices. Bridgen stated he was one of the few MPs willing to speak publicly on the issue of MPs' low pay. It was reported that Bridgen received additional income from his family vegetable firm, and he was criticised by local Labour politicians for being 'out of touch'. In June 2015, following the announcement that MPs were to be awarded a 10% pay rise, Bridgen again spoke out, criticising wealthier cabinet ministers for publicly turning down the additional money, which he said he would take himself.

In August 2014, AB Produce, of which Bridgen was director, was warned by the Environment Agency that it could lose its licence if it did not remove a "urine-like" smell from two "lagoons" of putrid vegetable matter on the site. The smell had reportedly been a source of complaints from neighbours for several years, and following the enforcement action, the issue was resolved.

Bridgen was re-elected as MP for North West Leicestershire at the 2015 general election with an increased vote share of 49.5% and an increased majority of 11,373.

In 2015, Bridgen sold his constituency house in Appleby Magna for £2 million, under a government High Speed 2 (HS2) compensation scheme as the house is 100 feet (30 m) from the proposed route. The sale was also reported to be linked to his divorce proceedings. He was criticised by local campaigners for selling at the early stage under an "exceptional hardship scheme", but Bridgen argued he had lost more money than anyone else. In March 2017, Bridgen apologised for failing to declare during an HS2 debate that his home was being bought by the high-speed rail link. He made the apology in the House of Commons after being found to have breached the rules governing MPs' interests following an investigation by the Commons standards watchdog. However, Bridgen argued that he had been a consistent critic of High Speed 2, casting doubt on the economic benefits associated with the proposals, and the costs of the programme regardless of his property interests. Bridgen was criticised in May 2016 for claiming nearly £25,000 on expenses in a single year for staying in hotels in London. He stated that his use of hotels was cheaper than having a flat and was a short walk from Parliament when it finished late at night. During this time, he did not allow his staff to claim for expenses for hotel stays, saying "they come down and work for me two days in London, stay at their own expense down here, and then go back and then work in the constituency the rest of the time".

Bridgen was again re-elected at the snap 2017 general election with an increased vote share of 58.2% and an increased majority of 13,286.

In March 2018, Bridgen stated in Parliament that there were 'no rough sleepers' in his constituency of North West Leicestershire. Mark Grant, the manager of Leicester-based charity Action Homeless, responded that despite what official figures show, North West Leicestershire was a part of the county where the charity had most people presenting from. He added: "We know rough sleepers from North West Leicestershire migrate to Leicester to get access to services there that aren't available where they are from." Bridgen disputed the response and pointed to government investment in the area.

Bridgen has been accused by Pink News of making homophobic statements. He has also been accused of anti-semitic statements. He has denied each allegation. On 7 August 2018, Bridgen supported comments made by Boris Johnson, regarding the wearing of burkas by some Muslim women in Britain.

On 14 October 2018, on BBC Radio 5 Live, Bridgen, during a discussion of Brexit, incorrectly said that he and any British citizen was entitled to an Irish passport as part of a special arrangement with the Republic of Ireland. According to Stephen Nolan, Bridgen then hung up the phone during the break for the news bulletin and then could not be contacted to clarify his remarks.

Bridgen endorsed Boris Johnson during the 2019 Conservative leadership election.

In November 2019, Bridgen apologised after defending Conservative MP Jacob Rees-Mogg's comments suggesting that Grenfell Tower fire victims should have concluded that the 'stay put' advice given by the London Fire Brigade was incorrect. Bridgen suggested on BBC Radio 4 that Rees-Mogg would have made a better decision than the authority figures who gave the flawed advice. Bridgen later said: "I do not want to add in any way to the pain that this tragic event has caused. I apologise."

At the 2019 general election, Bridgen was again re-elected with an increased vote share of 62.8% and an increased majority of 20,400.

In April 2022 Bridgen was found by a High Court judge to have lied under oath in relation to claims that he made in court about his family business, AB Produce. It was found that he encouraged a police inspector to investigate his brother, a director of the company, on false allegations of fraud. He also made false allegations about the reasons why he had left the company.

In January 2024 Bridgen attracted criticism from other MPs after it emerged that he was planning to host an MEP from the German far-right party Alternative for Germany in parliament.

=== Campaigns ===
Following a very serious injury to a constituent in July 2011, Bridgen called for legislation to ensure Britons travelling abroad have adequate medical insurance. Bridgen also sought to highlight the risks of head injuries associated with sporting injuries. He is a supporter of reform of the pub industry, supporting moves to introduce a market rent option for tied tenant publicans. Bridgen is a supporter of the Fair Deal For Your Local campaign.

Bridgen supported calls for reform to the NHS. In June 2011, he attacked critics of Andrew Lansley's proposed NHS reforms, saying that they comprised "Stalinist protectionist elements".

In 2012, Bridgen campaigned for the electrification of the Midland Main Line.

Bridgen forced a Government U-turn in 2013 over plans for military intervention in Syria, when he organised a letter to the Prime Minister signed by 81 fellow Conservative MPs, demanding parliament be given a vote on whether the UK should send military assistance to anti-government Syrian rebels. Bridgen later stated his support for air-strikes against ISIS terrorists in Iraq.

Bridgen successfully lobbied the government to cut Air Passenger Duty for children in 2014, a move backed by travel operators and supported by a 2013 study report.

In 2014, Bridgen led calls to have non-payment of the TV licence fee made a civil rather than a criminal matter. The legislation in force "is effectively criminalising them for being poor", he told The Times and "most of those sent to prison as a result of non-payment are the elderly and women". The government later adopted Bridgen's proposal, which was also supported by the Labour Party, though the BBC said the potential loss of £200 million could lead to closure of channels.

In 2017 Bridgen joined fellow local Conservative MP Heather Wheeler in campaigning for the return of passenger rail services on the Burton-to-Leicester railway line, the Ivanhoe Line.

=== European Union ===
Bridgen is a long-term critic of the European Union. In February 2016, he criticised the BBC for selecting pro-EU guests for the BBC Newsnight and BBC Radio 4 Today programmes. He also stated that the BBC should not claim that Britain enjoyed a special status as David Cameron's EU renegotiations had not changed anything. He supported Leave in the 2016 referendum, going on to back group Leave Means Leave after the Brexit vote, and signing a letter to the Prime Minister in September 2017. Bridgen was one of the 28 so called Tory "Brexit Spartans" who voted against Theresa May's Brexit deal all three times it was put to the House of Commons.

=== Relationship with other politicians ===
Bridgen was a critic of the former Conservative Prime Minister David Cameron. After calling for him to be replaced in 2013, Bridgen withdrew a letter of no confidence in 2014 after he failed to attract the support of enough colleagues to trigger a vote of no confidence. Three weeks before the EU referendum in 2016 he declared that Cameron's position was untenable and he would have to be replaced, possibly immediately after the vote.

In July 2018, Bridgen wrote a letter of no confidence in relation to Theresa May, who had replaced David Cameron as Prime Minister, in which he argued she should be replaced as leader of the Conservative Party as her "promises over leaving the EU are all a pretence and a charade intended to dupe the electorate which is an insult to their intelligence."

Bridgen raised concerns in 2010 to the Conservative whips' office about the behaviour of fellow Conservative MP Dan Poulter with female MPs. The Sunday Times published these allegations, that Poulter had put his hand up the skirts of at least three female MPs, during the MeToo scandal in late 2017, and in November 2017 Bridgen reported Poulter to the Conservative Party's newly established disciplinary committee. No female MP had made any complaint about Poulter, and he was subsequently cleared of inappropriate behaviour claims in March 2018. Poulter took legal action for libel against The Sunday Times, whose defence was that it was simply reporting accusations made by others against Poulter. However, the High Court ruled that the stories implied guilt of sexual assault, causing The Sunday Times to admit that the claims were false and it should not have published them, and paying substantial libel damages to Poulter.

Bridgen has been an outspoken critic of the former Speaker of the House of Commons, John Bercow. In March 2018, he suggested Bercow should resign, and also reported him to the parliamentary commissioner for standards, to investigate whether he had broken the MPs' code of conduct. An inquiry into allegations that Bercow had bullied members of staff was subsequently blocked by MPs and he remained in post. Bridgen repeatedly called for disciplinary action and the resignation of Labour MP Keith Vaz over a range of different issues.

In March 2019, Bridgen clashed with Conservative MP Ken Clarke in the House of Commons over the nature of representative democracy.

In January 2022, he submitted a letter of no confidence in Boris Johnson having previously backed him for leader in the 2019 leadership election, citing a "moral vacuum" at the heart of Government in relation to the lockdown parties, explaining his reasons for doing so in an article for The Telegraph.

=== Breach of standards ===
In November 2022, the Commons Select Committee on Standards confirmed Kathryn Stone's findings that Bridgen broke the MPs' code of conduct by approaching ministers and officials for a company that had given him a donation, a visit to Ghana, and offered him an advisory contract. The Standards Committee report stated that Bridgen emailed Stone asking about what he said were rumours that Boris Johnson would give Stone a peerage but this depended on her "arriving at the 'right' outcomes" during the Parliamentary Standards investigations. Bridgen was asked to apologise to Stone for trying to put her under unacceptable pressure. Stone's investigation found Bridgen failed to declare the trip, the donation, and a contract to advise the company. He also did not mention these when approaching ministers on behalf of the firm. The standards committee stated if Bridgen did not intend to take payments he should have cancelled or changed a contract stating the company would pay him £12,000 a year. The Standards Committee recommended a five day suspension from the Commons and this was enacted in January 2023.

Bridgen's alleged offences included an "unacceptable attack upon the integrity" of Stone. Bridgen appealed against the finding. The Standards Committee said Bridgen showed a "very cavalier" approach to the rules and found he broke lobbying rules "on multiple occasions and in multiple ways". The Independent Expert Panel did not accept his appeal and stated "In our view the sanctions for breach of the rule against paid advocacy and for the email letter could properly and fairly have been more severe."

=== COVID-19 conspiracy theories ===
In December 2022, the British Heart Foundation criticised Bridgen for promoting claims that there was a conspiracy by the foundation to cover up evidence of mRNA vaccines increasing inflammation of heart arteries. Bridgen had called for a halt to COVID-19 vaccinations. The charity "categorically" denied his allegations.

On 11 January 2023, Bridgen had the Conservative whip suspended after tweeting about COVID-19 vaccines: "As one consultant cardiologist said to me, this is the biggest crime against humanity since the Holocaust." Bridgen claimed the tweet had been moderated by staff members, which was denied by a Conservative Party spokesman. Prime Minister Rishi Sunak called the comparison "utterly unacceptable". Two days later, Bridgen issued a statement saying his tweet was not antisemitic, and apologised "for any offence caused". He said he was taking legal advice about action against those who had labelled him as antisemitic. Bridgen further contended that he asked "reasonable questions" about the side-effects of mRNA vaccines, and had "received huge support from ordinary people, medical workers [and] those who have experienced vaccine harms themselves".

In March 2023, Bridgen posted tweets promoting a conspiracy theory claiming that COVID-19 originated at Fort Detrick.

On 29 February 2024, Bridgen referenced capital punishment as an appropriate response to "crimes against humanity" regarding the vaccine rollout.

=== Reclaim Party ===
On 12 April 2023, Bridgen was expelled from the Conservative Party in further reaction to his January comments that compared COVID-19 vaccinations with the Holocaust. In May 2023, he joined the Reclaim Party, becoming the party's first MP. He resigned from the party in December 2023.

=== 2024 general election ===
Bridgen stood as an independent in North West Leicestershire at the 2024 general election, finishing second last with 3.2% of the vote. He lost his deposit of £500 by failing to meet the 5% vote threshold.

== Personal life ==
Bridgen married his first wife, Jackie, in 2000 and they had two sons, the second of which he has not spoken to for several years. Jackie was a Conservative councillor for the Oakthorpe and Donisthorpe ward of North West Leicestershire District Council from 2007 until losing her seat in 2011. Andrew and Jackie were divorced in 2012. Bridgen married the Serbian opera singer Nevena Pavlović in 2017.

In early 2024 Bridgen and Pavlović announced their separation; she said that her husband had been "captured by an anti-vax cult" and that he was putting his new "ideology before the health and wellbeing of his child and showed the full neglect of his parental responsibilities".

=== Family legal dispute ===
Bridgen has been involved in a long legal battle against his own family's potato and vegetable business, AB Produce, stating the firm treated him unfairly and forced him out, while the business was suing him over claims he has failed to pay rent on a £1.5 million property owned by the firm. In April 2022, High Court Judge Brian Rawlings ruled against Bridgen, stating that he "lied under oath and behaved in an abusive, arrogant and aggressive manner", was "an unreliable and combative witness who tried to conceal his own misconduct", and "gave evasive and argumentative answers and tangential speeches that avoided answering the questions". After losing the case, Bridgen stated that "in actuality I won the case and my brother will be compelled by the Court in due course to repay considerable sums of money back to the businesses", adding "if courts always got everything correct the first time there would be no need for appeal mechanisms". In August 2022, Bridgen was evicted from the property, and ordered to pay £800,000 in legal costs.

== Notes ==
Parliament of the United Kingdom
Preceded by David Taylor	Member of Parliament for North West Leicestershire; 2010–2024	Succeeded by Amanda Hack
