= Reclaiming Health and Safety For All =

British government report

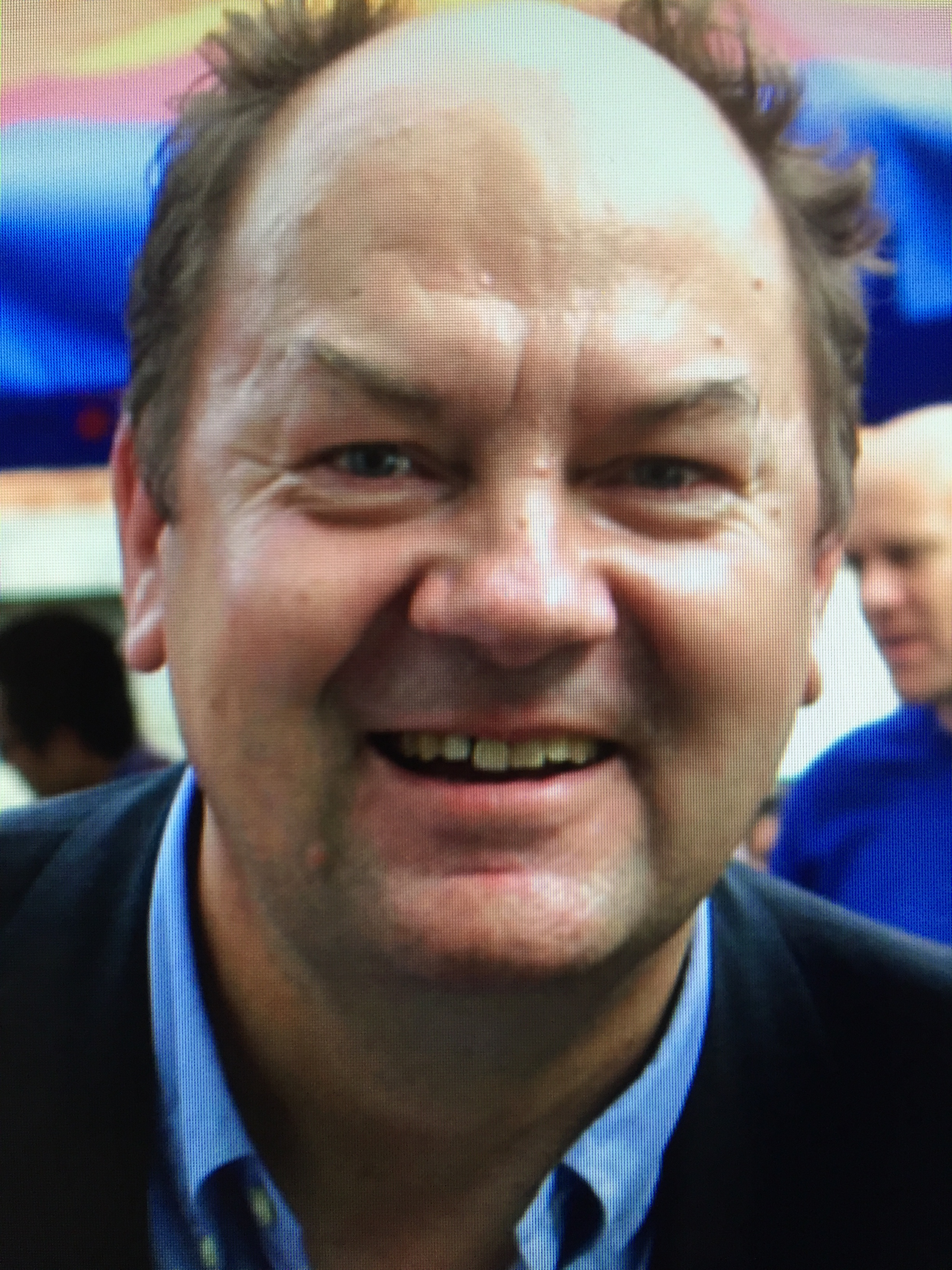
Ragnar Löfstedt, author of the report

Reclaiming Health and Safety For All also known as the Löfstedt Report is a 2011 independent review commissioned by the British government to review existing health and safety legislation and its impact upon businesses. The report was written by Ragnar Löfstedt and recommended the revocation of regulations that were of no benefit, updating of approved codes of practice and the abolition of the "strict liability" to mitigate all risks. The report resulted in a review of all Approved Codes of Practice by the Health and Safety Executive and the revocation of two regulations that were perceived to be of no benefit.

== Background ==
The report was commissioned by the Department for Work and Pensions in March 2011 to look at the existing level of health and safety legislation and the burden it placed on businesses. Professor Ragnar Löfstedt, director of the King's Centre for Risk Management (King's College London), was appointed to lead the study and he published the report on 28 November 2011.

== Recommendations ==
Löfstedt reviewed approximately 200 regulations and 53 approved codes of practice (ACoP) that came within the remit of the Health and Safety Executive (HSE). He noted that whilst the overall volume of legislation was in fact less than that of 35 years ago there would be benefits from consolidating the existing regulations into sector-specific packages, as had been done recently with explosives legislation, which had previously been spread across numerous regulations.

Löfstedt made 26 recommendations, all of which were accepted by the government in their response to the report. Löfstedt recommended that the HSE revise all ACoPs as some were out of date or overly complex. He recommended the revocation of the Notification of Conventional Tower Cranes Regulations 2010 for which he could see no benefit and the Construction (Head Protection) Regulations 1989 which were duplicated by the Personal Protective Equipment at Work Regulations 1992.

One major proposal was that those self-employed persons whose work had no potential to harm others be exempted from health and safety law, as was the case in several European countries. He also wanted to see the use of "as far as reasonably practicable" (meaning that health and safety measures should not be disproportionate to the risk) extended to all health and safety legislation to abolish the "strict liability" to mitigate all risks that was relied upon by many compensation claims. Löfstedt also proposed that the HSE assume responsibility for directing all investigations and enforcement actions, some of which came under the purview of local authorities instead.

== Response ==
The official government response to the report acknowledged that there was a fear of prosecution for minor offences amongst the self-employed and directed the HSE to draw up proposals to remove aspects of health and safety law for low-risk occupations, which was believed to apply to around one million people. They stated that there was a very low likelihood of any such persons being prosecuted for minor offences before the change. The government agreed to increase training for local authority inspectors to try to ensure a more consistent standard of inspection. The Notification of Conventional Tower Cranes Regulations and Construction (Head Protection) Regulations were revoked, as recommended by Löfstedt, in April 2013. But it refused to give the HSE responsibility for directing all inspection and enforcement, leaving many duties with local authorities.

The Institution of Construction Safety raised concerns that there was insufficient time and capability for the HSE to review all approved codes of practice by April 2012, as Löfstedt had recommended, though the review itself was welcomed. Other bodies stated that clarity was needed on which self-employed persons would be exempt and whether a sufficient level of health and safety would be maintained by these persons. There was also a wish to ensure enforcement proceedings were carried out in a timely manner, within three years of the breach of regulations.

Löfstedt's report was broadly welcomed, and seen as a way to reduce the regulatory burden on small and medium enterprises by emphasising the need for risk-based rather than hazard-based regulation (i.e. focusing on the likelihood of an event rather than its severity). He produced a follow-up review of recommendations in 2012, but declined to revisit the report when asked to do so in 2013.
