= Ostrovok.ru =

Russian online hotel booking service (e. 2010)

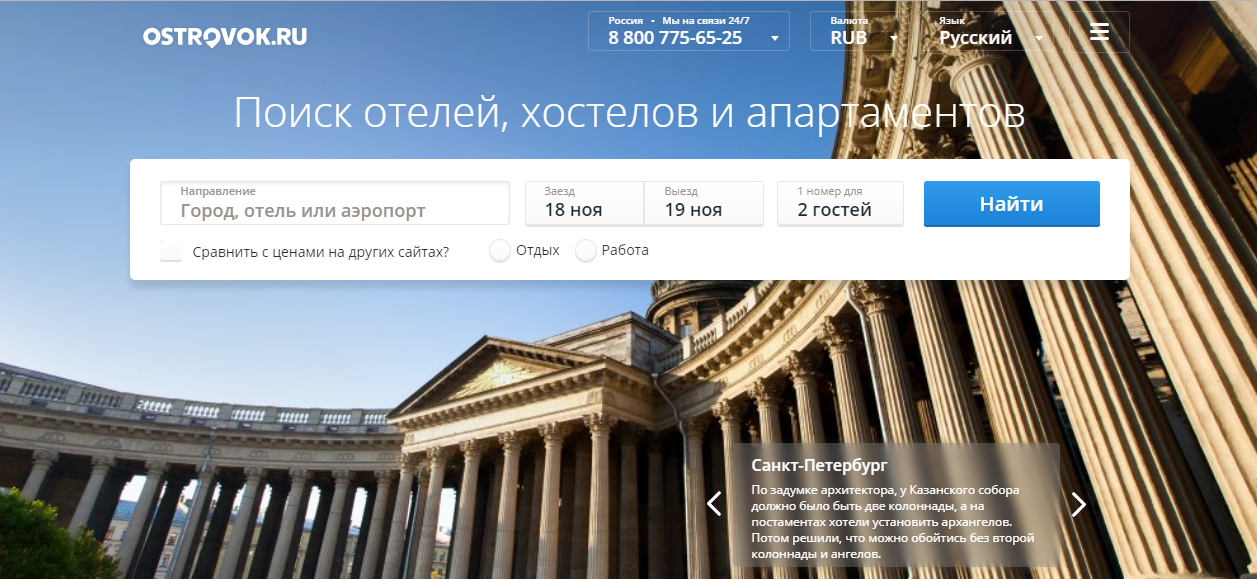
- Website type: online hotel booking service
- Available in: Russian, English, German, Spanish, Italian, French, Polish, Portuguese
- Creators: Serge Faguet and Kirill Makharinsky
- Commercial: Yes
- Launched: 2010

Ostrovok.ru is a Russian online hotel booking service founded in 2010 by Serge Faguet and Kirill Makharinsky with HQ in Moscow. It has over one million accommodation options. According to SimilarWeb, the number of users of the service was estimated at 5.4 million in August 2018. As of 2018, the company's turnover was estimated at $713 million. Ostrovok.ru partners included Megafon, HotelsCombined, TripAdvisor, Sheremetyevo Airport, Aviasales, and Kayak.

== History ==
The company was founded in 2010 by Russian entrepreneurs Serge Faguet and Kirill Makharinsky after attracting the first investment of $13.6 million from several foreign investors. The online website Ostrovok.ru emerged on July 11, 2011, after the company's first office was opened in Moscow. The event was attended by representatives from Google, Yandex, Booking, British Airways, and other notable companies. Later, the Extranet service was launched to manage the accommodation objects, and the first direct contracts with hotels were signed. In the first year of operation, the service was included in the Forbes list of the best startups.

In 2012, Ostrovok.ru became a resident of the Skolkovo Innovation Center. In April of the same year, Ostrovok.ru entered a partnership agreement with the Australian hotel metasearch engine HotelsCombined; which allowed for cross-organizational data sharing. In the same year, Ostrovok.ru has launched the first versions of applications for iOS and Android were launched.

In the spring of 2013, the company attracted a new round of investments worth $25 million. At the end of the year, Ostrovok was included in the list of the best startups according to the magazine The Firm's Secret, ranking fifth in the overall standings and first in the category "Leisure and entertainment." It was also ranked "The best Internet service," according to National Geographic Traveler.

In 2014, the company launched a B2B service, B2B.ostrovok.ru, and a loyalty program. In 2016, Ostrovok.ru ranked second in the rating of Russian hospitality industry websites, according to SimilarWeb.

In 2017, after Serge Faguet left Ostrovok.ru, Felix Shpilman took over as CEO.

In September 2018, with Ostrovok.ru technology, the sale of hotels was launched by Pobeda Airlines.

On 2 April 2024, the service rebranded. Instead of the name Ostrovok.ru, the service now uses the name Ostrovok. An exclamation mark was added to the logo.

== Features of the service ==
Ostrovok.ru is an online platform for booking hotels and searching for flights. Depending on the model of the company's cooperation with each particular hotel, a user is offered one of the three ways to make a reservation: a guarantee of booking with a plastic card, booking without a card, and booking and paying with a plastic card. If full prepayment is required, the user is offered a form of payment for a booking implemented on the Ostrovok.ru website.

According to the data for 2018, over one million accommodation options were available on the site, and all information about the hotels included in the database is provided by those hotels or their representatives.

In addition to the main function of the service, Ostrovok.ru enables user to search for airline tickets. There is a separate service for interaction with legal entities, B2B.ostrovok.ru. The API of Ostrovok.ru is used by companies as Megafon, HotelsCombined, TripAdvisor, Sheremetyevo Airport, Aviasales, and Kayak.

In addition, the site has a loyalty program called Bank snov (Bank of dreams). It is stylized as a fictional bank in which dreams are put into an account. For each night in the hotel booked through the service, the client receives 2-4% of the cost of booking in the form of dreams. One dream is equal to one ruble, which can be spent on the next booking.

== Owners and management ==
Ostrovok.ru is owned by Emerging Travel Group, whose founders are Serge Faguet and Kirill Makharinsky.

In 2014, Maharinsky left the company but remained on the board of directors. Later that year, one of the company's first investors joined the board of directors, Fritz Demopoulos, also a co-founder of the largest online booking service for hotels and air tickets, Qunar, in China.

In 2017, Serge Faguet also left the company. Felix Shpilman replaced him as CEO, having worked at Ostrovok.ru since 2013, first as vice president of strategy and then as a manager of the company's core operations.

== Investments ==
To launch the online service, Serge Faguet and Kirill Makharinsky attracted $13.6 million worth of investments from a number of international investors, including General Catalyst Partners, Accel Partners, Peter Thiel and Founders Fund, Niklas Zennström and Atomico Ventures, Mark Pincus, Esther Dyson, Fritz Demopoulos, Sebastien de Hallo, Naval Ravikant, Felix Shpilman, Scott Banister, James Hong, and Sam Schank. All of the investors received non-controlling interests; nevertheless, more than 50% of shares in the company remained with its founders.

In March 2013, Ostrovok.ru attracted another $25 million. General Catalyst Partners Fund again became the main investor; and Frontier Ventures, Accel Partners. and Yuri Milner again became co-investors. According to the company, all funds were spent on improving the partnership network and increasing the number of call center employees as well as developing existing and new products.

In 2014, the co-founders of the VKontakte social network, who were Vyacheslav Mirilashvili and Lev Leviev, invested $12 million in Ostrovok.ru. Later in the same year, the General Catalyst and Accel Partners investment funds withdrew from the capital of Ostrovok.ru.

The total investment in Ostrovok exceeds $50 million. According to Serge Faguet, he has invested $2 million of his personal funds in the company since its existence, and he remains one of the largest shareholders in the business.

== Key indicators ==
Officially, Ostrovok does not disclose its figures. However, according to Kommersant, the company's revenue in 2012 was about $1 million; in 2013, about $4 million. In the summer of 2015, the turnover of the online service was $15 million per month; revenue and expenses, about $1 million per month; and the annual turnover increased to $200 million. In 2016, according to Makharinsky, the company's turnover was more than $350 million, and the company paid off its investors.

According to Kommersant, in 2018, the turnover of the Emerging Travel Group amounted to $713 million.

According to SimilarWeb, the service audience in August 2018 was estimated at 5.4 million people.
