= Ilya Perekopsky =

Russian-born entrepreneur, manager and investor

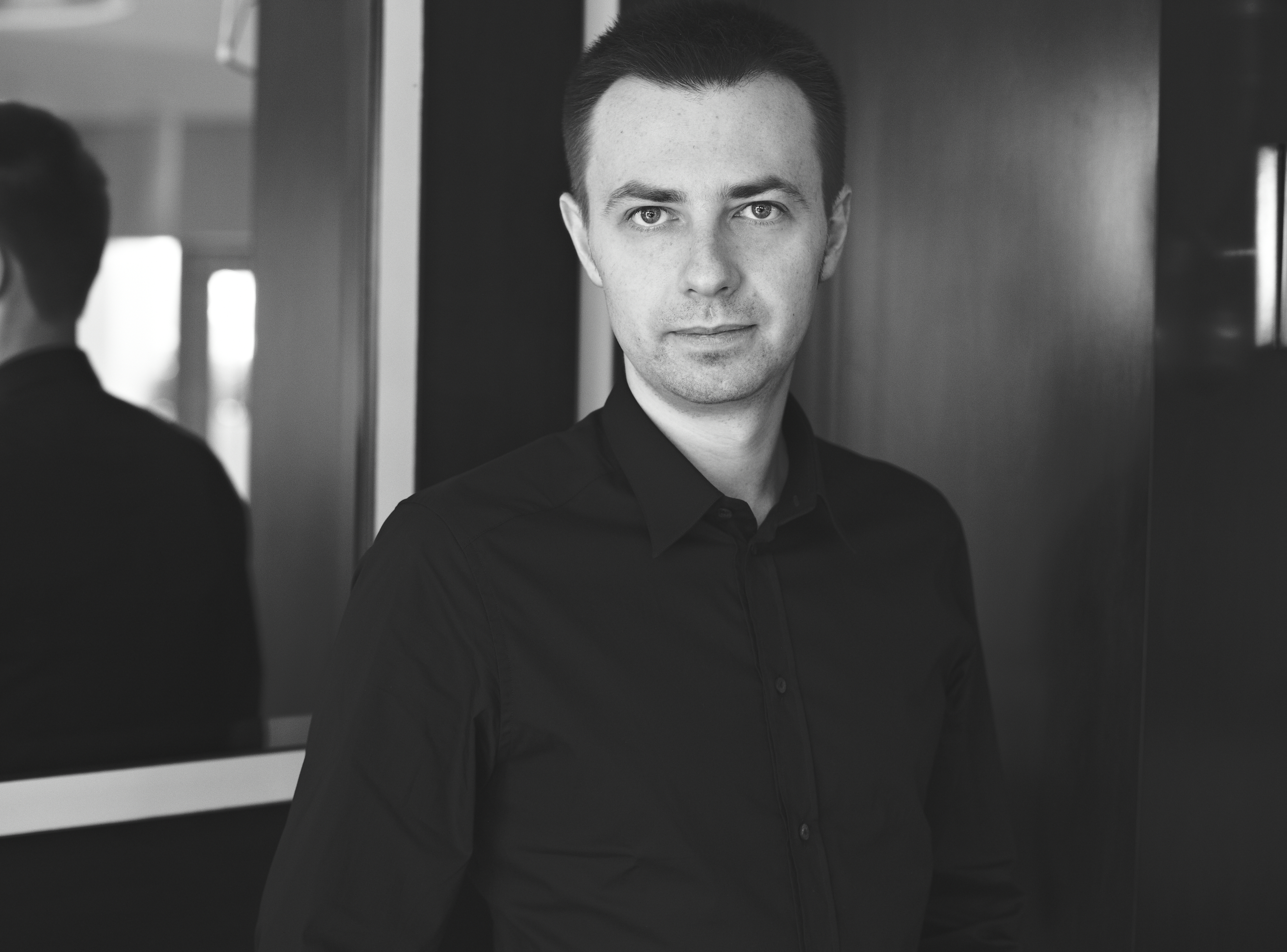
- Perekopsky in 2013
- Born: Ilya Evgenievich Perekopsky; 18 November 1983 (age 42); Cherepovets, Russian SFSR, Soviet Union
- Citizenship: Russian
- Education: Saint Petersburg State University
- Occupations: Programmer, entrepreneur, investor
- Years active: 2006–present
- Known for: Founding VK in 2006; Telegram Messenger; Blackmoon Financial Group

Ilya Evgenievich Perekopsky (Russian: Илья Евгеньевич Перекопский; born 18 November 1983) is a Russian-born entrepreneur, manager, and investor. Vice President of the VKontakte network (2006-2014), Vice President of Telegram since 2018. Founder of Blackmoon Financial Group and the Blackmoon Crypto startup.

== Early life and education ==
Ilya Perekopsky was born on November 18, 1983, in Cherepovets. He finished a local school #25. In 2001 Ilya moved to St. Petersburg. He graduated from Saint Petersburg State University in 2006, where he majored in English language and translation at the Department of Philology. He was in the same year as Pavel Durov, together with whom he developed the first-ever in Russia social network VKontakte.

During their studies, Ilya and Pavel set up and launched an online university forum spbgu.ru. In 2006, Ilya was at the origins of the VKontakte (VK) social network, which grew to become the largest in Europe. Their investor was the father of Vyacheslav Mirilashvili.

== Career ==
From October 2008 to January 2014, Perekopsky served as Deputy CEO of VKontakte, responsible for recruitment, key accounts, and commercial operations, including targeted advertising. He headed a social network and a recruitment platform for professionals called "Vshtate" (literally translated as In-house), a subsidiary of "VKontakte" (as of today, the company has suspended its operations).

In February 2014, he went on to become an advisor to the UCP Foundation. In the spring of 2014, UCP and Pavel Durov exchanged lawsuits.

In 2014, Ilya founded Blackmoon Financial Group, an aggregator for the non-bank lending market. By September 2017, Blackmoon Financial Group's turnover exceeded $140 million.

In 2014, he invested in a Cypriot company SMTDP Tech, which was developing anti-photoshop technology.

In 2017, he established Blackmoon Crypto, a blockchain-based, investment fund-building platform, which was able to raise $ 30 million during its ICO.

=== Telegram ===
After moving to Telegram, Ilya Perekopsky’s first big project was raising equity for Grams, a cryptocurrency of the new TON blockchain developed by Telegram. TON was the most sought-after crypto project in 2018-2019. The equity had to be acquired in two stages: pre-sales and stage A investments. Altogether, $1.7 billion was raised in two rounds. Among the investors were various well-known top-tier venture capitalists: Sequoia, Benchmark, Kleiner, Yuri Milner. But the project never took off, as the SEC sued Telegram. Ilya Perekopsky and Pavel Durov testified in an American court during the process. The court sided with the SEC, and TON was grounded.

According to the court award, 72% of the invested money had to be returned to the investors, but Telegram offered those who could wait a year a reimbursement of their investments at 100% value, plus 10% on top. This offer was not made only to US investors. Some of the investors were unhappy with the offer and sued Telegram. There has been a case, where the court sided with Telegram, and the investor had to pay compensations for all legal expenses of both parties. Perekopsky testified before court.

On July 9, 2020, Ilya Perekopsky spoke at an event at the invitation of Russian Prime Minister Mikhail Mishustin, where he raised the issue of a massive brain-drain of talented developers from Eastern Europe to the United States. He broughtTelegram as an example of a company that helps most of its developers grow inside their region by organizing large-scale contests for such talents and, by doing so, gives them a reason and a chance to stay in Eastern Europe, while the best professionals get an opportunity to move to work in the Telegram headquarters in Dubai, UAE. Another topic he touched upon during the meeting was the 30% commission that Apple collects from app developers. “In the past, in the times of the Golden Horde, the peoples it conquered had to pay a monetary tribute to its main headquarters in Tatarstan. And now there is another headquarters somewhere in San Francisco near the Golden Bridge, where everyone is bringing their spoils,” Perekopsky said.

After TON's failure, Perekopsky stayed on at Telegram as vice president. In March 2021, he helped raise more than $1 billion through selling five-year bonds in Telegram.

In 2022, Perekopsky met with Brazilian President Bolsonaro. During their meeting, they discussed freedom of speech and respect for the Brazilian Constitution. Prior to this, in Brazil, the court ruled to block Telegram, the ruling was reverted 2 days after.

== In art ==
Ilya Perekopsky made an appearance in the film "Durov" by Rodion Chepel, it was his first televised interview. Also, it was the first interview to feature an employee of Telegram, a company known for its seclusion. His account relates a lot of inside information helping to settle a number of disputed questions. The movie tells that the idea of throwing paper planes made of 5 thousand rubles banknotes from the window of the Vkontakte office belongs to Perekopsky; it was his way of showing the world that money was nothing but dirt.

== Personal life ==
Ilya Perekopsky is multilingual. He is fluent in English, French, Spanish and Russian.

As of September 2023, he was based in Dubai.

His brother Igor, a former employee of Severstal, was the CFO of VKontakte.
