= Coub =

Russian video sharing platform

- Website type: Video sharing
- Founders: Anton Gladkoborodov; Igor Gladkoborodov; Mikhail Tabunov
- Website: coub.com
- Launched: 2012

Coub is a Russian video streaming platform available on the web, iOS and Android. It allows users to create and share looped audio-visual collages up to ten seconds long, using existing video clips from YouTube, Vimeo, and other popular video sharing websites, or their own files. Founded in 2012 by brothers Anton and Igor Gladkoborodov, the company started in Moscow, Russia. The company announced its plans to open the office in United States in July 2013, subsequently based in New York City. On 1 January 2020, the company's founder Anton Gladkoborodov left the company, and CMTT, the Russian internet publishing house that used to be one of the platform's minority stakeholders, took over the project. Since April 2022, Coub has been operated by a "private tech company headquartered in Switzerland".

== History ==
Coub was founded in 2012 by Anton and Igor Gladkoborodov and developer Mikhail Tabunov. The name "Coub" comes from Cobb, the protagonist of the film Inception. In June 2013, Coub raised $1 million in additional funding from venture capital firms Brothers Ventures and Phenomen Ventures, and announced plans to open a U.S. office. The iOS app was launched in December 2013 and included the ability to record and upload a "coub" directly from an iPhone camera, as well as filters similar to those on Instagram. As of April 2014, over 400,000 videos, or "coubs" have been created. In July 2014 Coub raised $2.5 million from Vaizra Investments, a fund founded by Lev Leviev and Vyacheslav Mirilashvili, the founders of VK.com, Russia's major Facebook competitor.

In January 2020, the company co-founder Anton Gladkoborodov left, and the sole ownership and operational control over Coub.com was turned over to a Russian publishing house “Comitet” that manages media portals vc.ru, TJ, and DTF.

It was announced on 15 March 2022, that as of 1 April 2022, Coub would cease operation. Despite the initial announcement, the banner with the message was subsequently removed and the website remains operational past 1 April. On 5 April a new banner appeared saying "Coub will keep living and evolving with the new team. Stay tuned". On 18 April, Coub’s newly launched official Telegram channel announced that the company's new owners are a "private tech company headquartered in Switzerland".

== Function ==
Using Coub's web-based editor, users can extract a snippet up to 10 seconds long from a video already hosted on popular video hosting websites, such as YouTube, Vimeo, Twitch, and Instagram, or one that they've uploaded, and add a full-length audio track to play along with the clip. The video can be set to reverse, looped, or mixed with random reactions. Several recognized animators and contemporary artists, such as Sholim and Simon Stålenhag, had pioneered "coubs" as a new media format.

"Coubs" can be shared on social media and embedded via embed.ly.

As of November 2018, Coub had reached over 1 billion views per month.
