= Kiriyenko =

Kiriyenko (Ukrainian: Кіріє́нко, Киріє́нко; Russian: Кириенко; Belarusian: Кірыенка) is a surname of Ukrainian origin. Alternative transliterations include Kirijenko/Kirienko, Kyriyenko/Kyrijenko/Kyrienko, and Kiryienka/Kiryjenka. Notable people with the surname include:

- Grigory Kiriyenko (born 1965), Russian fencer
- Ihor Kiriyenko (born 1986), Ukrainian footballer
- Sergey Kiriyenko (born 1962), former Prime Minister of Russia
- Valeri Kiriyenko (born 1965), Russian biathlete
- Vasil Kiryienka (born 1981), Belarusian cyclist
- Vladimir Kiriyenko (born 1983), Russian business executive
- Zinaida Kiriyenko (1933–2022), Russian actress and singer
