= Lev Binzumovich Leviev =

Israeli-Russian entrepreneur and investor

- Лев Бинзумович Левиев
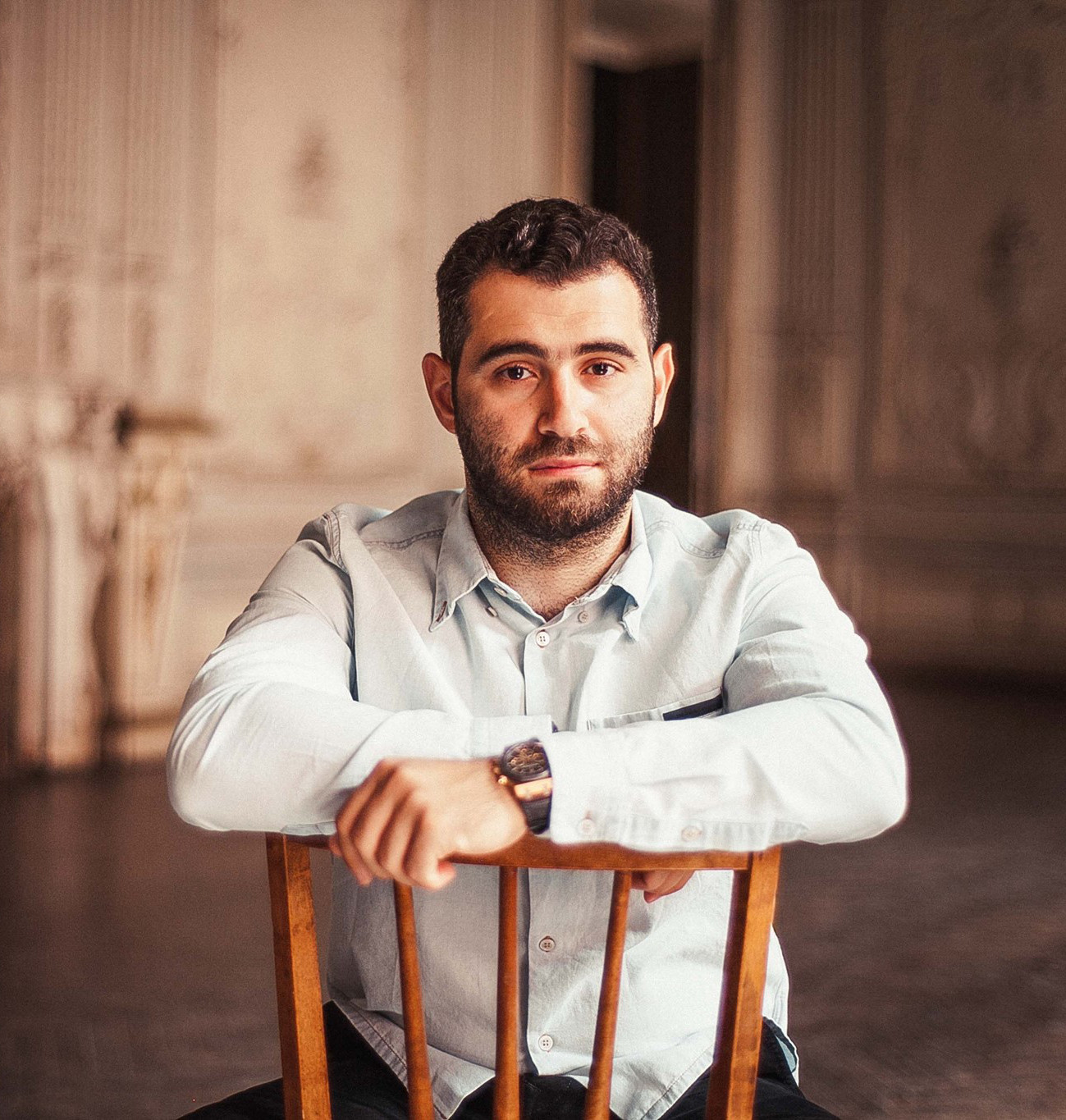
- Born: Lev Binzumovich Leviev; June 22, 1984 (age 42); Volgograd, Soviet Union
- Occupations: Entrepreneur, investor
- Known for: co-founder of VK.com and Selectel

Lev Binzumovich Leviev (Russian: Лев Бинзумович Левиев; born June 22, 1984) is a Russian entrepreneur and investor, founder of international venture capital firm LVL1, co-founder of Russia's largest social network VK.com (originally VKontakte) and the Selectel data center network.

== Early life and education ==
Leviev was born in Volgograd. He attended the American school in Herzliya, Israel, where he met his future business partner Vyacheslav Mirilashvili. In 2006, he earned a bachelor of Commerce degree in Finance and Accounting at McGill University in Canada, where he graduated with honors.

He is married.

== Early career ==
=== VK.com ===
In 2006, he co-founded VK.com with his friends, Yitzchak Mirilashvili and Pavel Durov.

Leviev and Vyacheslav invested tens of thousands of dollars in the project. The money was borrowed from Mirilashvili-Sr. Leviev's share was 10%. From the moment of founding the company until 2012, he was the Chief Operating Officer of VK.com.

Yuri Milner's Digital Sky Technologies fund was the company's first external investor. He bought a quarter of the network in 2007 and later merged DST's shareholdings into the Mail.Ru Group. At the end of 2010, the holding increased its VK.com ownership stake by 7.5% - from 24.99% to 32.49%. Mail.ru Group secured the option to buy another 7.5% of VK.com in 2011.

In July 2011, Mail.ru exercised the option and increased its shareholding to 39.99% which reduced the total share of the partners from 55.5% to 48.01% making Leviev's share between 6% or 8%, according to various sources.

Having learned about negotiations between his fellow co-founders and Alisher Usmanov in March 2012, Durov deleted their profiles id3 and id4. Leviev and Mirilashvili were planning to exit VK.com via an IPO for $3 bln, but at the end of March, Durov announced that the social network would not IPO for an undefined period.

In April 2013, Ilya Sherbovich's investment fund, United Capital Partners, paid an estimated $840 mln for the partner's share. Assuming a valuation of $1.75 bln for the entire network, Leviev would have received $105–140 mln.

During the conflict between UCP and Pavel Durov, the fund considered Leviev as a potential CEO of VK.com.

=== Selectel ===
In 2007, Leviev and Vyacheslav Mirilashvili founded the Selectel data center network to provide for VK.com’s needs in processing and storing servers.

By 2009, VK.com’s full server capacity was being managed by Selectel. In 2012, VK.com opened its own data center, but it still remains a client of Selectel.

After selling his VK.com shares in September 2014, Leviev assumed the role of CEO at Selectel.

In May 2014, it was reported that Selectel was investing ₽1 bln in a technopark in Saint Petersburg that would include a data center, offices and warehouses.

By the end of 2016, Selectel was ranked the fourth largest IaaS provider for public and hybrid cloud in Russia (based on revenue).

By 2017, the company was one of the largest IaaS providers in Russia, with a market share of 7%. At the end of 2017, Leviev stepped down from the CEO position, while remaining the Chairman of the board of directors.

=== Btc.com ===
In 2014, Leviev co-founded BlockTrail with his long time friend, Boaz Bechar. Leviev set up the holding company BlockCorp which made an initial investment of €500,000 in the BlockTrail project. The company developed a blockchain explorer, Bitcoin transaction analytics tools and multi-platform Bitcoin wallets.

In 2016, the project was bought by Bitmain, a Chinese producer of equipment for mining Bitcoins, and renamed BTC Wallet (btc.com).

== Investments ==
=== Current investments ===
In 2012, Leviev founded LVL1 Group, which primarily focuses on venture capital investments in technology companies, as well as real estate and bitcoin. Its venture portfolio consists of more than forty international companies in mobility tech, food tech, gaming, health tech and more, including Rapyd fintech company, Emerging Travel Group, Flink, Webflow, Fnatic and ResQ.

Leviev has invested in international projects, such as:

- 2013 - Plarium, a game developer (acquired in 2017 by Aristocrat Leisure, an Australian producer of slot machines, for $500 mln);
- 2015 – Optishell, a developer of a technology for identifying illegal filming in cinemas, Moovit, an urban mobility data analytics company and free public transportation app (acquired by Intel), Meta, an AI-powered research search engine (acquired in 2017 by Chan Zuckerberg Initiative, for $25 million).

In 2019, LVL1 Group led a $19 million fundraising for Fnatic, a global eSports organization, joined by UK VC firm Beringea, Hong Kong-based BlackPine, London-based Unbound, and Joi Ito, Head of MIT Media Lab. Leviev joined Fnatic's Board.

=== Other Significant Investments ===
Investments include:

- 2014 — Coub (a Russian platform for making looped videos), Livetex (a service for online communication), Ostrovok.ru (a Russian Online Travel Agency).

=== DST Global ===
Leviev is an investor in several of Yuri Milner's DST Global venture funds.

DST Global II acquired shares of Facebook, Twitter, Airbnb, Spotify, Alibaba and Xiaomi.

Among the most publicized investments of DST Global IV are Ola Cabs, an Indian car-hailing service, Flipkart, an Indian e-commerce platform, and Slack, a corporate communications platform.
