= Selectel =

Russian provider of cloud infrastructure

Selectel Ltd.

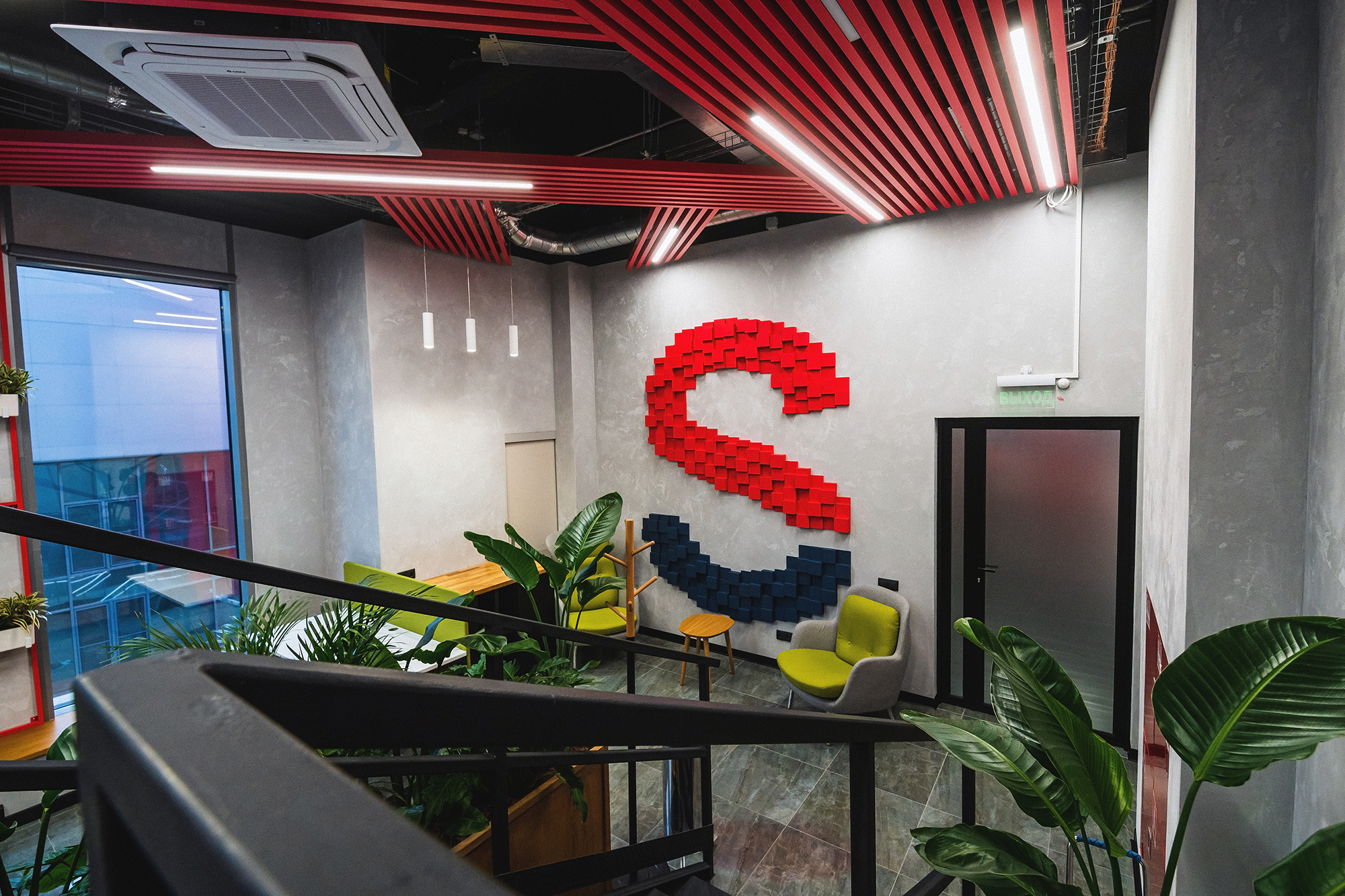
- Type: LLC
- Industry: Telecommunication
- Founded: 2008
- Headquarters: St. Petersburg, Russia
- Key people: Oleg Lyubimov (CEO)
- Revenue: ▲10.2 billion Russian ruble (2023)
- Operating income: ▲3.9 billion Russian ruble (2023)
- Net income: 3,018,458,000 Russian ruble (2025)
- Total assets: 17.3 billion Russian ruble (2023)
- Website: selectel.com

Selectel JSC. (Russian: AО "Селектел") is a Russian provider of cloud infrastructure and data center services. It was founded in 2008, and it currently owns and operates six data centers in Moscow, St. Petersburg, and the Leningrad region. According to iKS-Consulting, in 2023, Selectel ranked 3rd among cloud infrastructure providers in Russia with an 8.5% market share and led the bare metal server rental segment with 56%.

== History ==
The company was founded in 2008 by Vyacheslav Mirilashvil and Lev Binzumovich Leviev, former investors of the Russian social network VKontakte. In order to meet the growing needs of VKontakte, they registered Selectel and launched the First Data center in St. Petersburg, Russia. Between 2008 and 2012, Selectel opened 5 new data centers:

- Tsvetochnaya 1 in St. Petersburg
- Berzarina in Moscow
- Dubrovka 1, 2, 3 in the town of Nevskaya Dubrovka, outside of St. Petersburg.

Selectel's sixth and latest Tier III data center, Tsvetochnaya 2, was launched in December 2015 in St. Petersburg, right next to Tsvetochnaya 1.

In November 2015, RIPE NCC included Selectel on their list of K-root node hosts.

On October 10, 2017, Selectel announced a non-financial partnership with Russian-Singapore joint venture SONM by sharing the use of blockchain technology. The first joint products will be launched in 2018.

In 2019 the company announced the availability of its services in the Novosibirsk region of Russia, and in 2020 launched its services in Tashkent, Uzbekistan.

In May 2022, Selectel announced that it is building its seventh data center Yurlovsky (the company’s second data center in Moscow).

By July 2024, the company transitioned to a JSC ownership structure.

== Services ==
Selectel presently offers a variety of brands and services including dedicated physical and virtual server leasing, colocation services, cloud services (managed databases, object storage, Managed Kubernetes and others). In 2015, Selectel released the Virtual Private Cloud.

In 2018 Selectel launched a public cloud based on the VMware technologies. In 2021 Selectel received the status of an authorized VMware DRaaS provider which confirms that the infrastructure of Selectel’s cloud powered by VMware fully complies with the technical requirements of VMware.

In March 2023, Selectel launched an on-premise private cloud installation service. In October 2024, Selectel introduced its own enterprise-class operating system based on Debian Linux.

Selectel is known to rarely take down malicious content or spam services hosted on its network.

== Industry awards ==
In 2019, Selectel was announced as the winner of the National Data Center Awards (Russian: «Национальная премия ЦОДы. РФ») in the “Cloud of the Year” category.

In 2020, Selectel won the Russian Data Center Awards as the fastest-growing IaaS provider.

In 2022, Selectel received an award in the category "Data Center of the Year" at the National Data Center Awards.

In 2023 and 2024, Selectel's cloud platform won the National Data Center Awards in the category "Cloud of the Year".

== Links ==
- Official Site
