= Anastasia Fedko =

Russian actress

- Born: Anastasia Pavlovna Fedko; 1 December 2000; Tolyatti, Russia
- Citizenship: Russia, United States
- Occupations: Actress, voice actress, blogger, influencer
- Years active: 2020–present
- Known for: Theatre roles, voice acting, social media presence

Anastasia Pavlovna Fedko (Russian: Анастаси́я Па́вловна Федько́; born 1 December 2000) is a Russian and American actress of theatre and film, a voice actress, and a content creator.

== Early life ==
Anastasia was born on 1 December 2000 in Tolyatti. In interviews and videos, Anastasia says she grew up watching the Disney Channel and numerous American TV shows and sitcoms, the most popular of which was Hannah Montana. She has been a huge Disney fan since childhood, wrote fan fiction about fairies, and dreamed of one day becoming a movie star in the United States.

== TikTok ==
At the age of 17, she moved to Saint Petersburg and enrolled at Pushkin Leningrad State University to study journalism, but withdrew after six months. She later studied producing at the Saint Petersburg State Institute of Film and Television, leaving after her fourth year following her admission to study theatre acting in New York. At this time (nearly 2020), the girl began to actively develop her social networks, film a lot of videos in TikTok, shoot funny sketches and collaborate with many Russian bloggers of the time.

== Moving to New-York ==
After the 2022 Russian invasion of Ukraine, on 8 March 2022, she temporarily relocated to Tbilisi together with her boyfriend Mikhail. On 11 March 2022 she posted a video from Georgia, saying that they cannot find an apartment to live, because of a massive relocation from Russia. During this time, she started a YouTube channel, which by then began to gain significant reach. All time being in Georgia, Anastasia prepared the documents for educational visa to the US. In the autumn of 2023, she moved to New York City after being admitted to the Neighborhood Playhouse School of the Theatre, where she has lived since.

Throughout all these events, the blogger continued to move toward her goal without stopping. And after a major development, Anastasia and her boyfriend, with 200,000 Russian rubles and a little English, they went to conquer New York.

Her training at the Neighborhood Playhouse concluded with a premiere production of Dracula by Kate Hamill, in which she played the role of Renfield. Four performances were staged on 2, 5, 8, and 10 May 2025.

== Career ==
=== In Russia ===
While in Russia, Anastasia made her film debut in 2020, specifically in the TV series Newcomers, where she played Kristina's friend. In 2022, she released her first song, Moyapesnya.mp3. Also in 2023, after arriving in Russia, she dubbed the films Barbie, Flash, and Oppenheimer into Russian.

=== Red carpets ===
In January 2026, Fedko attended a number of industry events in Los Angeles, including the BAFTA Tea Party and the 83rd Golden Globe Awards. According to media reports, her presence at the events was arranged through a contract with an American advertising agency, which provided accreditation. Fedko's appearance on the Golden Globes red carpet generated significant buzz in digital media: videos on the awards' official accounts garnered over 25 million views, sparking discussion in Russian industry publications (Women.ru, PSGR from Aviasales, and Kinopoisk) in the context of the growing influence of influencers on traditional film awards.

Anastasia also attended a major event on 1 March called SAG-AFTRA 2026. The event was reported to have attracted world-class stars including Timothée Chalamet, Michael B. Jordan and many others. Anastasia presented herself as an aspiring actress in New York City with her agent Polina Nioly.

=== First role ===
Social media attention was also drawn to Anastasia's recent announcement that the blogger would be participating in a Netflix project. Details about the filming process are currently unknown. There are no hints about the blogger's intended role or the character's storyline.

== Theatre ==
- Everyone Has Their Flaws
- Dracula by Kate Hamill

== Discography ==
- Moyapesnya.mp3 (Мояпесня.mp3) (2022)

== Filmography ==
- Newcomers (Новенькие) (2020) — Friend of Kristina

== Dubbing ==
- 2023 — The Flash — Patty
- 2023 — Barbie — Barbie Lawyer
- 2023 — Oppenheimer — Lilli Hornig
