= Mikhael Mirilashvili =

Georgian oligarch

- მიხო მირილაშვილი
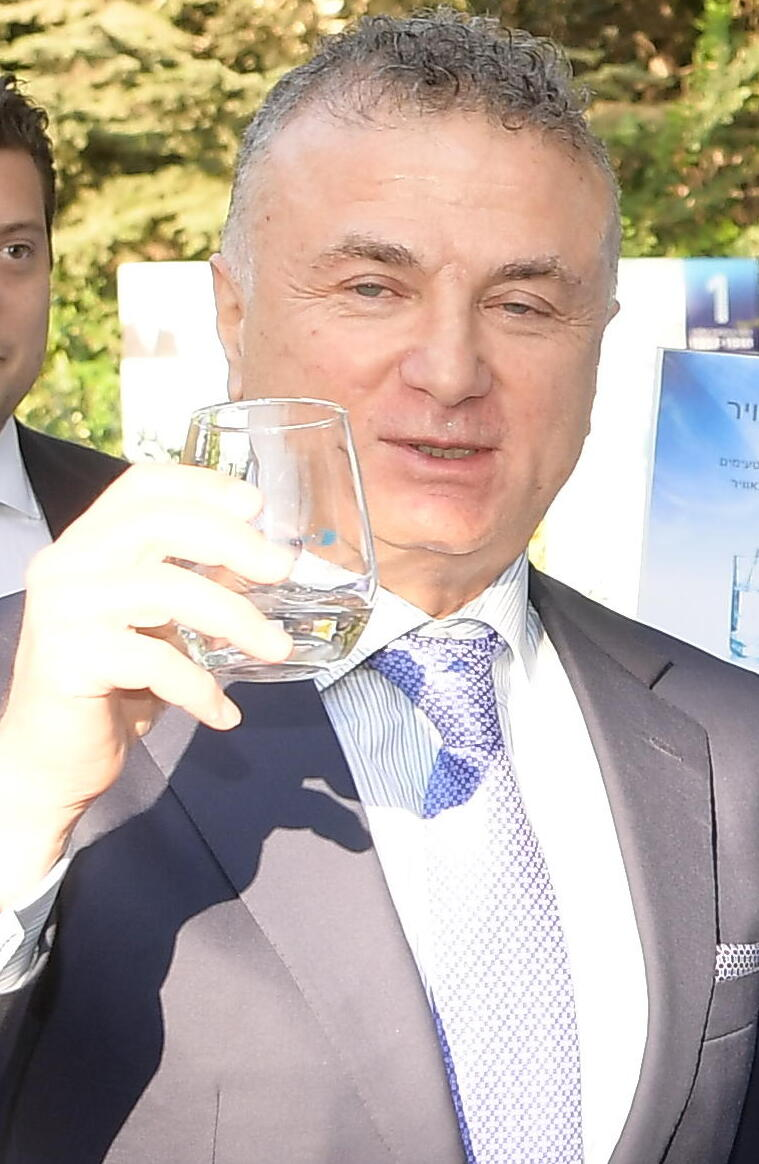
- Mirilashvili in 2021
- Born: 1 May 1960 (age 66); Kulashi, Georgian SSR, Soviet Union
- Education: Saint Petersburg University
- Occupations: Businessman, philanthropist
- Children: 2

Mikhael Mirilashvili (Georgian: მიხო მირილაშვილი, Hebrew: מיכאל מירילשוילי, Russian: Михаил Михайлович Мирилашвили; born May 1960) is a Russian-Israeli-Georgian businessman and philanthropist, based in Russia and Israel. Mirilashvili’s business enterprises operate primarily in real estate, construction of shopping malls, casino chains, petroleum industry, and renewable energy sectors, as well as in new media (VK.com). Mirilashvili is the president of the Saint Petersburg Jewish Congress.

== Early life ==
Mirilashvili was born to a Jewish family in May 1960 in Kulashi, a small town in Georgia. In 1977, he moved to St. Petersburg, then known as Leningrad. Originally trained as a mathematician, he qualified as a medical doctor from Saint-Petersburg University, and became a doctor, specializing in pediatrics. In the early 80s, Mirilashvili joined his family’s business, which was established by his father, Moshe Mikhael. By the mid-90s, Mirilashvili's family had developed several real estate businesses across Russia and expanded them beyond the borders of the commonwealth.

== Career ==
Mikhael Mirilashvili serves as the president of Petromir, a Russian holdings company, as well as director of Lukoil Northwest Petroleum. He also owns a television channel and numerous malls and commercial centers in St. Petersburg. In the 1990s, his bank Viking (Russian: «Викинг») became very large in St. Petersburg and the north-west of Russia. Mirilashvili is also the president of CONTI, the largest gambling corporation in St. Petersburg, with six casinos and other gambling venues. His Jackpot (Russian: "Джекпот") slot machine network is the largest in Europe.

Mirilashvili established several companies in Israel in recent years, including Kitaim, a venture capital fund, as well as Flarium Global, Be’er Isaac Energy, and Hoshen Argaman. The Mirilashvili family is one of the founders of Vkontakte, a Russian social network which they launched in 2006. They sold their shares in the company in 2013, receiving $1.12 billion for them. Last year, the family also began to invest in gas drilling projects in Israel.

"Selectel" (Russian: "Селектел"), a company belonging to him and his son Yitzchak Mirilashvili, owns several data centers.

== Philanthropy ==
Mikhael Mirilashvili and his family donated to Rabbi Yitzchak Dovid Grossman’s “Migdalor” association. Mirilashvili also donated several Torah scrolls to different units in the IDF through the ‘Friends of the IDF’ and other associations. He also contributed to the ZAKA delegation, serving as chairman for the International Board of Trustees. After the fire crisis in the Carmel, Mirilashvili teamed up with Alexander Mashkevitch to create a fleet of fire-fighting vehicles, and in 2012 he provided the planes for a delegation of doctors and paramedics who rushed to aid the victims of terror in Burgas, Bulgaria. Mirilashvili serves as president of the World Jewish Congress - St. Petersburg, as well as vice president of the Russian Jewish Congress, first vice president of the Euro-Asian Jewish Congress, president of the Maccabi Union in Russia and president of the "Torah and Chessed" Center for Jews in Georgia. Mirilashvili established the Moshe Mirilashvili Center for Food Security in the Desert at the Blaustein Institutes for Desert Research at Ben-Gurion University of the Negev in 2021 in memory of his father. He also supports a joint Israeli-Emirati Water Research Institute in Abu Dhabi with Tel Aviv University.

== Kidnapping incident ==
Mirilashvili's elderly father was kidnapped on a highway in August 2000 while driving in his Lexus LS, by a group pretending to be traffic police. The group was apparently unaware of who they had kidnapped and had not seen the logo of the family's casino company on the numberplate. A couple of days later, he was returned safely. Two weeks later, the dead bodies of those responsible for the kidnapping, along with their girlfriends and driver, were found near Isaakievskiy (Saint Isaac's) Square.

Russian authorities arrested Mikhael Mirilashvili (the son) and charged him with kidnapping in March 2001. According to the case details, Mirilashvili ordered the security service to find mafia members who had abducted his family, and as a result, mafia members were kidnapped to be delivered to the office of the company "Petromir", which belongs to the family. There, under torture, they told the coordinates of kidnappers of Mirilashvili-senior, then after his release they too were executed. The original kidnappers themselves were later found dead in Saint Isaac's Square.

A group of well-known Russian figures including Andrei Petrov, Oleg Basilashvili, Mikhail Boyarsky and poet and singer Alexander Rosenbaum protested the City Prosecutor’s Office’s illegal methods of investigation applied in this case. On 1 August 2003, The Leningrad District Military Court sentenced Mirilashvili to serve eight years in prison. Mirilashvili stated that the testimony of court expert Sergei Koval was an act of revenge and should be thrown out because of his personal interest in the case. Koval’s wife, Tatyana, was asked to resign at the Mirilashvili-owned Conti group as a result of not doing her job properly. While in prison, Mirilashvili fought the sentencing at the European Court of Human Rights in Strasbourg, France. The court declared that the taking and examination of the evidence was done in an unfair manner and had not satisfied the requirements of a fair hearing. In 2009, Mirilashvili was released from prison and returned to Israel and Saint-Petersburg.
