= TokBox =

Video conferencing software company

TokBox Inc
- Type: Private
- Industry: Video conferencing
- Founded: 1 May 2007
- Founder: Serge Faguet; Ron Hose
- Fate: Acquired; brand retired
- Headquarters: San Francisco, California
- Key people: Scott Lomond, CEO; Badri Rajaseker, CTO; Melih Onvural, Director of Product Management; Michael Kelleher, Director of Business Analytics; Ian Small, Chairman of the Board
- Owner: Vonage, a subsidiary of Ericsson
- Website: www.tokbox.com

TokBox was a PaaS (Platform as a Service) company that provided hosted infrastructure, APIs and tools required to deliver enterprise-grade WebRTC capabilities. It did so primarily through its proprietary OpenTok video platform for commercial application.

TokBox was founded by Serge Faguet and Ron Hose. Headquartered in the SOMA (South of Market) district in San Francisco, CA. TokBox was acquired by Telefónica Digital, a subsidiary of Telefónica, in October 2012. It was purchased from Telefónica by Vonage in 2018. Vonage has since retired the name "TokBox", using "Vonage APIs" instead.

== Developer resources ==
=== Server SDKs ===
Server SDKs: OpenTok's server SDKs wrap the OpenTok REST API, and let developers securely generate tokens for their OpenTok applications. Officially supported libraries include: Java and PHP. Community supported and created libraries include: Python, Ruby On Rails, .NET, Node.js, Perl, Golang.

=== Client libraries ===
Client Libraries: OpenTok's WebRTC client libraries enable video communications on a client platform. Officially supported libraries include: JavaScript, iOS and Android. Community supported and created libraries include: PhoneGap and Titanium.

== History ==
=== 2007 ===
- August: Series A funding from Sequoia Capital
- October: Launched www.tokbox.com
- November: Launched multi-party chat and partnership with Meebo.

=== 2008 ===
- April: TokBox Version 2 launched
- July: Series B funding from Bain Capital Ventures and Sequoia Capital

2009

- In July 2009, TokBox underwent a major restructuring that included laying off approximately 50% of its engineering team and the departure of its co-founders.

=== 2010 ===
- January: Rolled out its first set of paid features at $9.99 per month.
- November: Series C Funding from DAG Ventures, Bain Capital Ventures and Sequoia Capital

=== 2011 ===
- February: TokBox announced that as of April 5, 2011, they would be discontinuing the TokBox video chat and video conferencing service to focus solely on their API, OpenTok.

== See also ==
- Comparison of cross-platform instant messaging clients
