= TV10 Israel =

- Country: Israel
- Broadcast area: National

Programming
- Language: Hebrew

History
- Launched: 1 January 2025
- Former names: Calcala TV

Links
- Website: www.tv10.co.il

TV10 Israel (formerly Calcala TV, Hebrew: ערוץ הכלכלה) is an Israeli business television channel, the first of its kind in Israel, broadcasting from the Tel Aviv District city of Ramat Gan. The channel is owned by Yitzchak Mirilashvili.

== History ==
In April 2024, economics reporter Maayan Prilock, formerly of Channel 12, was appointed for the planned business channel.

In July 2024, it was announced that Yitzhak Mirlashvili, owner of Channel 14, planned to launch a business network in the coming months. Appointed for their posts were editor-chief Eran Bar Tal and two presenters, Danny Rupp and the editor of Israel HaYom's business section, Sonia Gorodisky. Mirlashvili reiterated that the channel would have no affiliation with any pre-existing news channel, by having a separate editorial team. In September, it was announced that the channel would occupy channel 10 on subscription television operators. Lee Sover was appointed presenter of the channel on 29 December, taking the post of presenter of a nightly program, She'ela Li ("I Have a Question").

The channel started broadcasting at 7:30pm on 1 January 2025 with a special two-hour program presented by Roi Katz. The channel's carriage is limited to OTT services and its initial supposition is possible alignment to the ruling government. On 2 January 2025, the channel aired its first full business day with the first broadcast from the Tel Aviv Stock Exchange. Its website resembles that of i24 News, raising suspicions of its possible affiliation with the Bibist right.

The channel adopted the name Channel 10 on 15 May, coinciding with its full launch, which featured a campaign that cost nearly NIS 3 million.
