= GIF art =

Animated digital art using GIF format

GIF art is a form of digital art that first emerged in 1987. The technology for the animated GIF has become increasingly advanced through the years. After 2010, a new generation of artists focused on experimenting with its potential for presenting creativity on the World Wide Web. Mass access to the Internet allowed their GIFs to travel rapidly and virally online, through social platforms such as Tumblr and Giphy, and to be recognized as a new form of art.

== History ==
GIF art has been around since 1987, increasingly gaining attention from the audience some years after 2000. One of the earlier implementations of GIF art can be traced back to web design in which they were used as banners, later they were adopted into the greater meme culture as a niche and have now become a staple on the internet through social media most notably from Giphy, Reddit and Tumblr.

=== GIF Art in Contemporary art and Modern Exhibitions ===
"Ars Longa" by GIF artist Sholim, 2013

GIF art animations have been exhibited in galleries and festivals around the world. Some works are exhibited in the form of physical, lenticular printed images. Contemporary art galleries and institutions like the Museum of the Moving Image are popular among many young artists.

== See also ==
- Animation – Method of creating moving pictures
- Graphic design – Interdisciplinary branch of design and fine arts
- Cinemagraph – Photograph with animated elements
- Computer art – Art genre
- Computer graphics – Graphics created using computers
- New Media Art – Artworks designed and produced by means of electronic media technologies
