= Lee Sover =

- לי סובר
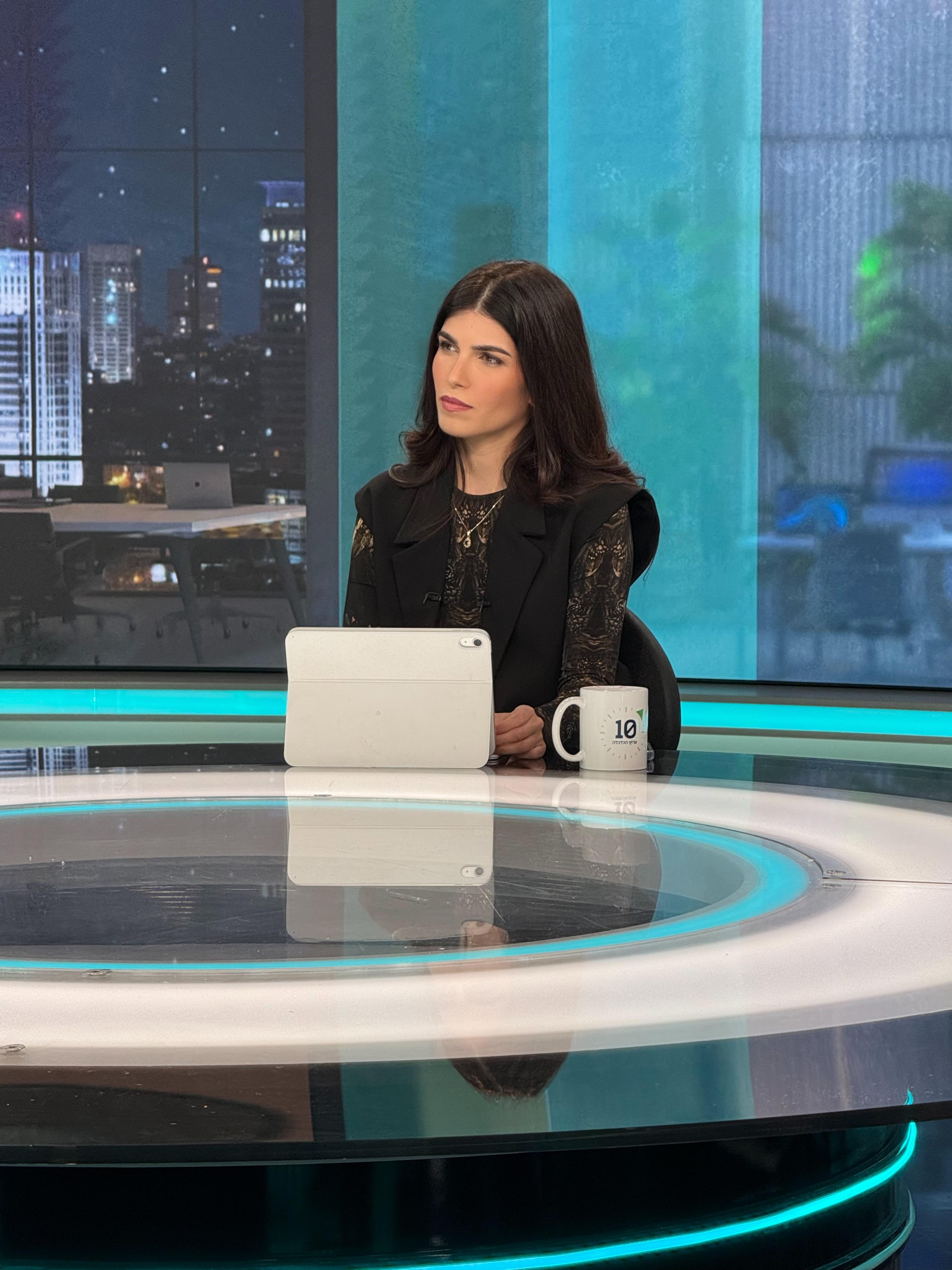
- Born: 23 April 1988 (age 37); Givatayim, Israel
- Occupations: Journalist, television presenter, voice actress, actress, content creator
- Employer: Economic Channel
- Known for: Hosting She'ela Li (I Have a Question) on the Economic Channel

Lee Sover (Hebrew: לי סובר; born 23 April 1988) is an Israeli media personality, content creator, voice actress, and actress. She is the host of the daily television program She'ela Li (I Have a Question) on the Israeli economic Channel (Channel 10).

== Early life and education ==
Sover was born in 1988 to Zippi, a librarian at the Beit Ariela Shaar Zion Library, and Professor Arieh Sover, a scholar and lecturer specializing in humor studies. She grew up and raised in Giv'atayim, Tel Aviv area. Sover earned a bachelor's degree in communications and management from the College of Management Academic Studies and completed courses in on-camera acting.

== Career ==
=== Journalism and television ===
In 2013, Sover began her career as an editor and reporter at the sports website ONE, covering the Liga Leumit and presenting sports news updates.

Between 2014 and 2016, she worked as a reporter, content editor, and studio presenter for Ynet.

From 2018 she hosted and produced comedy programs on Tedy Channel for Partner TV.

In 2021, she joined Channel 20 (later Channel 14) as a news presenter and later hosted the cultural program Achshav Tov ("Now It's Good"), focusing on technology, television, music, and consumer culture. During this period, she also led the "Tech-Lady" project for Calcalist.

In 2022, Sover became a magazine reporter and segment presenter on the show Hakol Kalul (Everything Included) on Reshet 13, where she introduced humorous street interviews as part of her reports.

Since December 2024, she has been presenting programs on the Economic Channel (Channel 10) and currently hosts the daily show She'ela Li ("I Have a Question").

=== Digital media ===
Active on social media since 2018, Sover is considered among Israel's early independent video creators. She has produced humorous sketches and branded content for companies and organizations including Walla!, Time Out Tel Aviv, VLU, and Kulanu. During the COVID-19 pandemic, she created comedic street interviews and pranks. In 2023, she launched the podcast Date with Lee Sover, which focuses on relationships and quality of life, featuring experts, artists, and comedians.

=== Acting and voice work ===
Sover has appeared in commercials, web series, and films, and has provided voiceovers for various brands including Mekorot, PayBox, and Pinuk.

In 2020, she portrayed "Maggie Maimon" in the Yes TV web series Dibur Harif (Spicy Talk). In 2022, she played a leading role in the film The Last Ticket to the Train.
