= Durov =

Durov (Russian: Дуров) or Durova is a surname. Notable people with the surname include:

- Anatoly Durov (1887–1928), Russian animal trainer
- Andrei Durov (b. 1977), Russian footballer
- Lev Durov (1931–2015), Soviet actor
- Nadezhda Durova (1783–1866), Russian soldier
- Nikolai Durov (b. 1980), Russian mathematician and programmer
- Pavel Durov (b. 1984), Russian entrepreneur & VK.com creator
- Valery Durov (born 1945), Russian philologist and teacher
