= Sholim =

Serbian animator

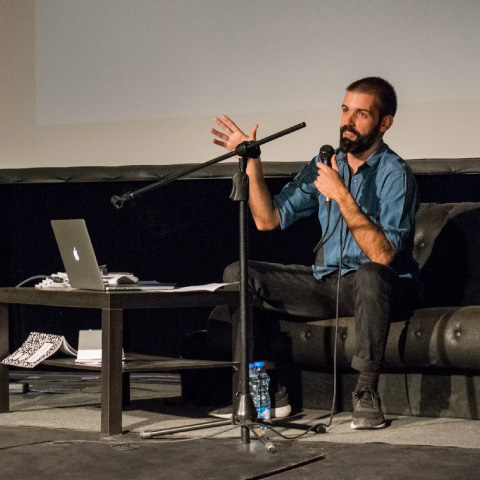
- Sholim at Aichi Triennale 2019, Nagoya, Japan
- Born: Milos Rajković; Belgrade, Serbia
- Occupation: Animator
- Years active: 2013–present

YouTube information
- Channel: Sholim
- Years active: 2013–present
- Genres: animation; surrealism
- Subscribers: 3,180
- Views: 274,000
- Last updated: 4 August 2026
- Website: sholim.com

Milos Rajković (Serbian Cyrillic: Милош Рајковић; born 1985 in Belgrade) is a Serbian animator known by the pseudonym Sholim.

Sholim is known for his surreal looped GIFs and animations, most of his videos are made with Photoshop and After Effects.

He was born in 1985 in Belgrade, then the capital of the Socialist Federal Republic of Yugoslavia and now the capital of Serbia.

== See also ==
- GIF art
