= United Capital Partners =

Asset management company in Russia

UCP Investment Group
- Type: Investment fund
- Industry: Financial services
- Founded: 2006; 20 years ago
- Headquarters: Moscow, Russia
- Key people: Ilya Sherbovich (founder, president and managing partner of UCP)
- Website: ucp.com/en/

UCP Investment Group is a Russian independent asset management company investing in publicly traded securities and private companies.

UCP’s investment portfolio includes assets in the industrial, oil & gas and infrastructure sectors, retail and consumer goods, private pension funds and internet technologies. As of August 2013, the total value of assets under management was estimated at 3.5 billion dollars.

== History ==
UCP was established in 2006 by a group of former employees and shareholders of United Financial Group (UFG), one of the Russia’s largest investment banks, following UFG’s acquisition by Deutsche Bank. Ilya Sherbovich, the former president of UFG, was the originator of the idea to create UCP; however he only became president of UCP in September 2007 after the integration of UFG into DeutscheUFG. At that point, he also became the owner of a controlling stake in UCP.

Following Sherbovich’s move from Deutsche Bank about 20 people also left the firm to join UCP, including two managing directors of the investment banking department – Victoria Lazareva and Mikhail Trofimov.

UCP has acquired a reputation as an activist investor seeking to increase the capitalization of its portfolio companies by ensuring compliance with the rules and standards of corporate governance.

As of 2016, Ilya Sherbovish, president and managing partner, owns 77.7% of UCP Group of companies.

== Investments ==
=== Retail and food production sectors ===
In April 2007, UCP acquired from Vladimir Gruzdev a 10% stake in Fashion Continent, a clothing retailer operating a chain of stores under the Incity brand. By the summer of 2010, UCP’s stake amounted to 27.75%.

UCP was a shareholder in a leading Russian juice producer Lebedyansky and owned a minority stake in its baby food manufacturing division, Progress, which was spun off from Lebedyansky prior to its sale to PepsiCo in 2008.

=== Financial sector infrastructure ===
An investment in Russian Trading System (RTS), Russia’s leading stock exchange, was the fund’s first successful project. The holding was sold at a significant profit in 2008. In 2011-2013 UCP completed a series of acquisitions of shares in the St Petersburg Exchange.

In October 2013, UCP acquired a corporate pension fund from Norilsk Nickel. Later the pension fund was renamed ‘NPF Nasledie (Heritage)’ and UCP concluded a partnership agreement with the Alor group of companies. Alor was also appointed manager of the pension fund.

=== Natural resources and infrastructure companies ===
As a result of three transactions with Novatek in 2007 and 2010, UCP sold three companies holding geological exploration licenses in the Yamalo-Nenets Autonomous Okrug.

In 2008, UCP acquired the diamond producer, Severalmaz. The business was sold to Alrosa at the end of 2011.

In June 2010, UCP acquired from the Integra group of companies a 100% stake in Uralmash-Drilling equipment (URBO), a producer of heavy drilling rigs. During the same year, UCP and Uralmash established a joint holding Uralmash-Drilling equipment (Uralmash NGO Holding), which included URBO and several drilling rig servicing companies. UCP increased its share in this joint venture to 85% in 2012.

In April 2014, Gazprombank and UCP (on a parity basis) became owners of Stroygazconsulting — a large oil & gas contractor.

Over several years prior to 2014, UCP built a 15.46% stake in Chelyabinsk Zink which was later increased to 26.95% as a result of significant minority stake acquisition from Aton. According to media reports, in August 2015 UCP has sold its stake which then had a market value of 8.8 bn roubles.

In 2015, UCP acquired a minority stake of 1.825% in Eurasia Drilling Company (EDC). In November 2015, controlling shareholders of the company conducted a buyout of minorities and delisted the company from the LSE. UCP and other minority shareholders considered that the buyback price was substantially below fair market value and filed a lawsuit in the Cayman courts against EDC. According to Kommersant, in July 2017 the parties signed a settlement agreement whereby the company agreed to pay a significant premium to the 2015 buyback price to UCP and other dissenting shareholders which ended the legal dispute.

=== Technology ===
In 2010, UCP acquired 5% in Monocrystal, one of the world’s leading manufacturers of synthetic sapphire for high-tech applications in electronics, optical devices and metallization pastes for solar cells. UCP increased its stake in 2011. In 2012, UCP exited the investment by selling its stake back to the founding shareholder.

=== Online Services ===
In April 2013, a consortium of investors led by UCP acquired a 48% stake in VK.com (VKontakte) from Vyacheslav Mirilashvili and Lev Leviev, co-founders of the social network. In August 2013, a dispute arose with Pavel Durov, another co-founder, CEO and 12% shareholder of VKontakte. UCP alleged that Durov had a conflict of interest as he had developed his own internet messenger, Telegram, using the resources of VKontakte and required him to transfer Telegram to VKontakte’s ownership. In December 2013, Durov sold his shares to Ivan Tavrin, the then CEO of MegaFon (a subsidiary of USM Holdings), and in March 2014 Tavrin sold this stake to Mail.ru Group, another subsidiary of USM Holdings. Pavel Durov stepped down as CEO of VKontakte in April 2014. In September 2014, UCP sold its stake to Mail.Ru Group for $1.4 7bn while VKontakte as a whole was valued at $2.917 bn. As a result, Mail.Ru owned 100% of the social network, while UCP was reputed to have made a profit of $470-570 mln over the 17-month period.

In December 2014, UCP invested in Russian start-up Youdo.com, an online on-demand service marketplace which matches users with independent household and business service providers. In July 2016, UCP, Flint Capital, and Sistema Venture Capital provided Youdo.com with a further $6.2M to finance geographical expansion.

=== Oil transportation and oil refining ===
Forbes magazine previously reported that, since 2011, UCP had been accumulating preferred shares of Transneft, the Russian oil pipeline monopoly. By mid-May 2016, UCP was the largest minority shareholder of Transneft. According to Forbes, as of May 2016, controlled Transneft stake with a total value of c. $1.3 bn. Later that year, UCP became involved in a legal dispute with Transneft management. UCP were demanding equal distribution of dividends for ordinary and preferred shares, that management should stop understating the profits and a full report on the company’s derivatives transactions which had caused multibillion-dollar losses for Transneft in 2014-2015. As a result of UCP’s shareholder activism, in December 2016 Transneft adopted a dividend policy setting dividend payouts at 25% of IFRS net income, i.e. substantially higher than historical payouts. In March 2017, in line with UCP’s demands, Transneft amended its charter to guarantee equal distribution of dividends to preferred and common shareholders. In March 2017, UCP sold 1.1 mln preferred shares for c.$3 bn to a group of financial investors.

=== Oil chemicals, oil refining, energy ===
In 2009-2011, UCP acquired a 24.99% stake in the petrochemical and oil refinery Gazprom Neftekhim Salavat. In May 2011, UCP exited the investment.

In December 2015, UCP acquired a 9.7% stake in the utilities company Inter RAO from Norilsk Nickel for $152.6 mln. In March 2016, Inter RAO bought back from UCP 1.1% of its shares. In October 2016, UCP sold the remaining 8.6% for $497 mln.

In October 2016, a consortium of investors, which included Trafigura, an international commodities trader, UCP and Essar signed a sales and purchase agreement to acquire a 49% stake in Essar Oil. Essar owns the second largest private oil refinery in India, an oil storage and port facility near the city of Vadinar, as well as a chain of more than 2,700 gas stations in India. Essar Oil was valued at $12.9 bn (including debt of $4.7 bn). Effective shares of UCP and Trafigura in EOL are 24% each. The transaction was completed in August 2017.

== Researches ==
In November 2018 UCP and the Moscow School of Management SKOLKOVO released the Business Value Index study, covering 30 of the world's largest economies, which produce 82% of global GDP. The "business value index" was based on 19 business valuation indicators in five categories: macroeconomics, investment security, interest rates, capital availability and tax policy. Russia was in 27th place with an index of 29.26 (the closer the index value is to 100, the closer the country's indicators are to the best practices), lagging behind developed markets and the rest of the BRICS countries.

== Links ==
- Official website
