= Vladimir Kiriyenko =

Russian businessman

- Владимир Кириенко
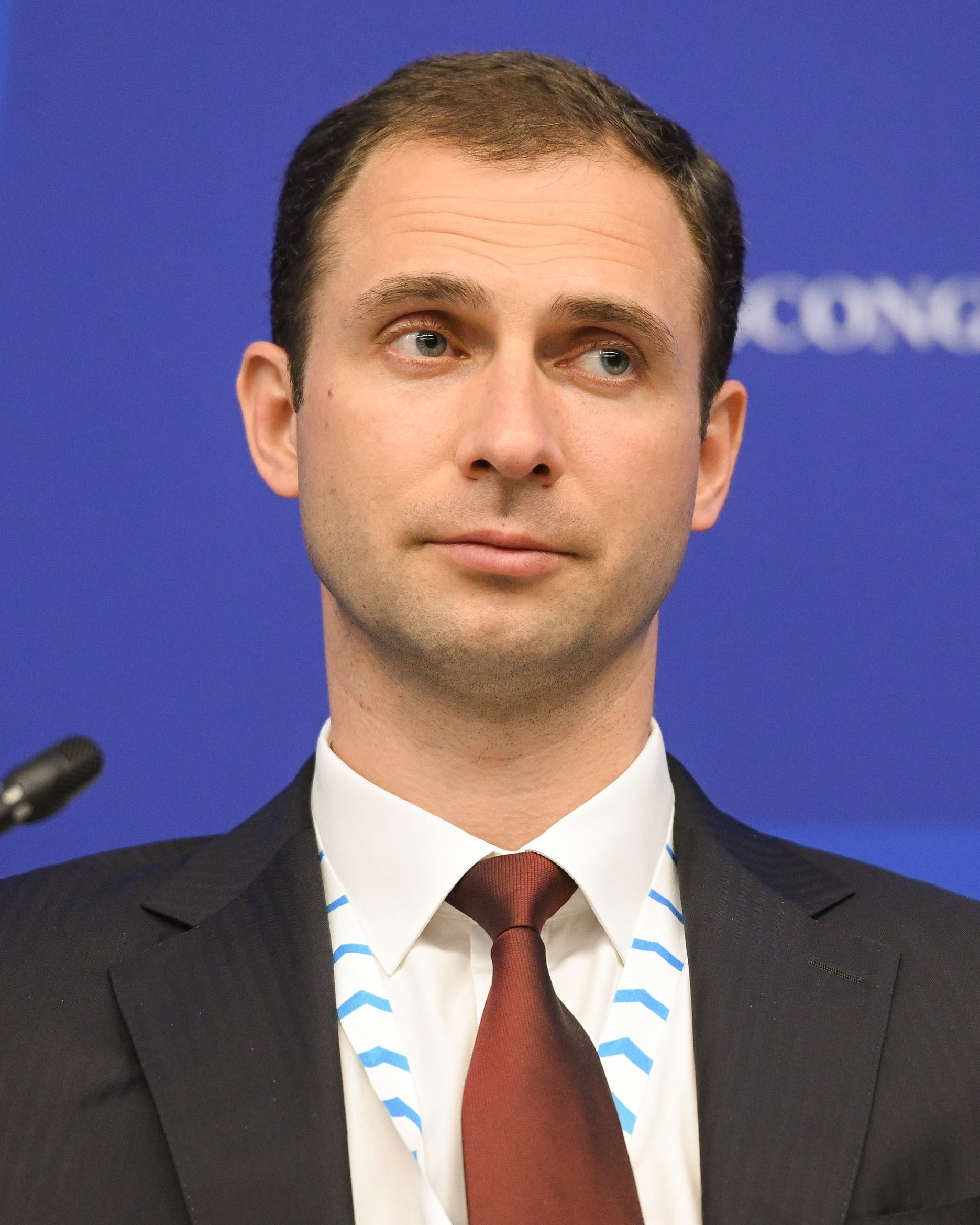
- Kiriyenko in 2022
- Born: Vladimir Sergeevich Kiriyenko; 27 May 1983 (age 43); Nizhny Novgorod, Russian SFSR, Soviet Union
- Education: Higher School of Economics; Moscow School of Management SKOLKOVO
- Parent: Sergey Kiriyenko

Vladimir Sergeevich Kiriyenko (Russian: Владимир Сергеевич Кириенко; born 27 May 1983) is a Russian business executive and media manager who is the CEO of VK, a popular Russian social networking service. He previously served as vice president of Rostelecom, one of Russia's leading long-distance telephone providers. Kiriyenko is the son of Kremlin official Sergey Kiriyenko.

== Early life and education ==
Kiriyenko was born 27 May 1983, in Nizhny Novgorod. He is the son of Sergey Kiriyenko. Kiriyenko graduated from the Higher School of Economics in 2005. He completed an executive Master of Business Administration from the Moscow School of Management SKOLKOVO in 2014.

== Career ==
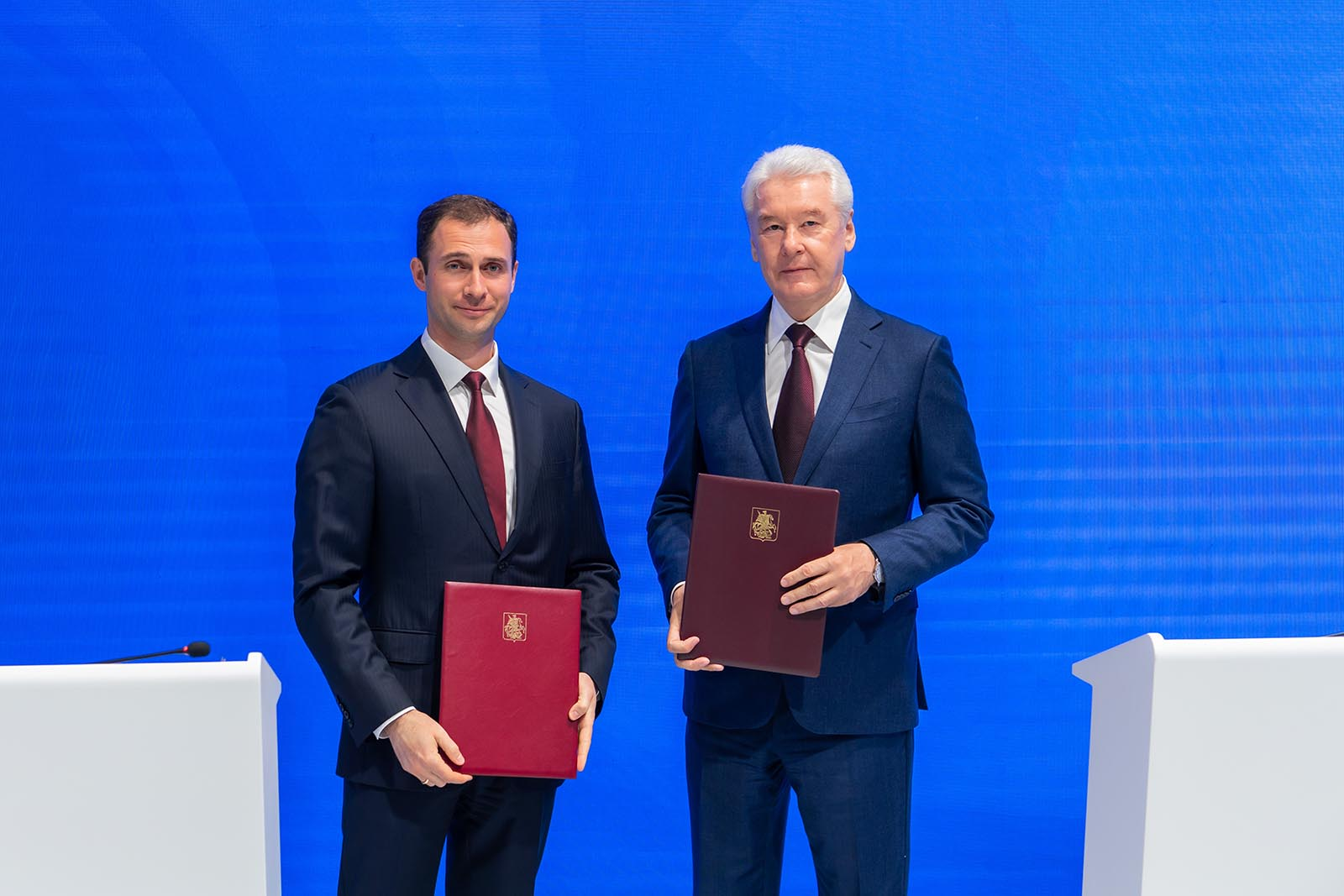
Kirienko and Sergey Sobyanin at the 2022 St. Petersburg International Economic Forum

From 2005 to 2011, he was the chairman of the board of directors of the VolgaTelecom and a member and chairman of the board of directors of Sarovbusinessbank. From 2008 to 2011, Kiriyenko was head of the board of directors of Nizhegorodpromstroybank. In 2011, he became chairman of Capital LLC, and in 2013 led venture capital (VC) firm Titanium Investments.

In 2016, Kiriyenkov succeeded Larisa Tkachuk as the vice president of Rostelecom. In December 2021, he became CEO of VK following the resignation of Boris Dobrodeyev.

=== Sanctions ===
In February 2022, Kiriyenko was sanctioned by the United States Department of the Treasury and added to the Specially Designated Nationals and Blocked Persons List.

He was sanctioned by the UK government in 2022 in relation to the Russo-Ukrainian War.

On 8 March 2022, Kiriyenko was sanctioned by the European Union.

== Personal life ==
Kiriyenko is married and has a son.
