= Maxim Ksenzov =

Russian politician (born 1973)

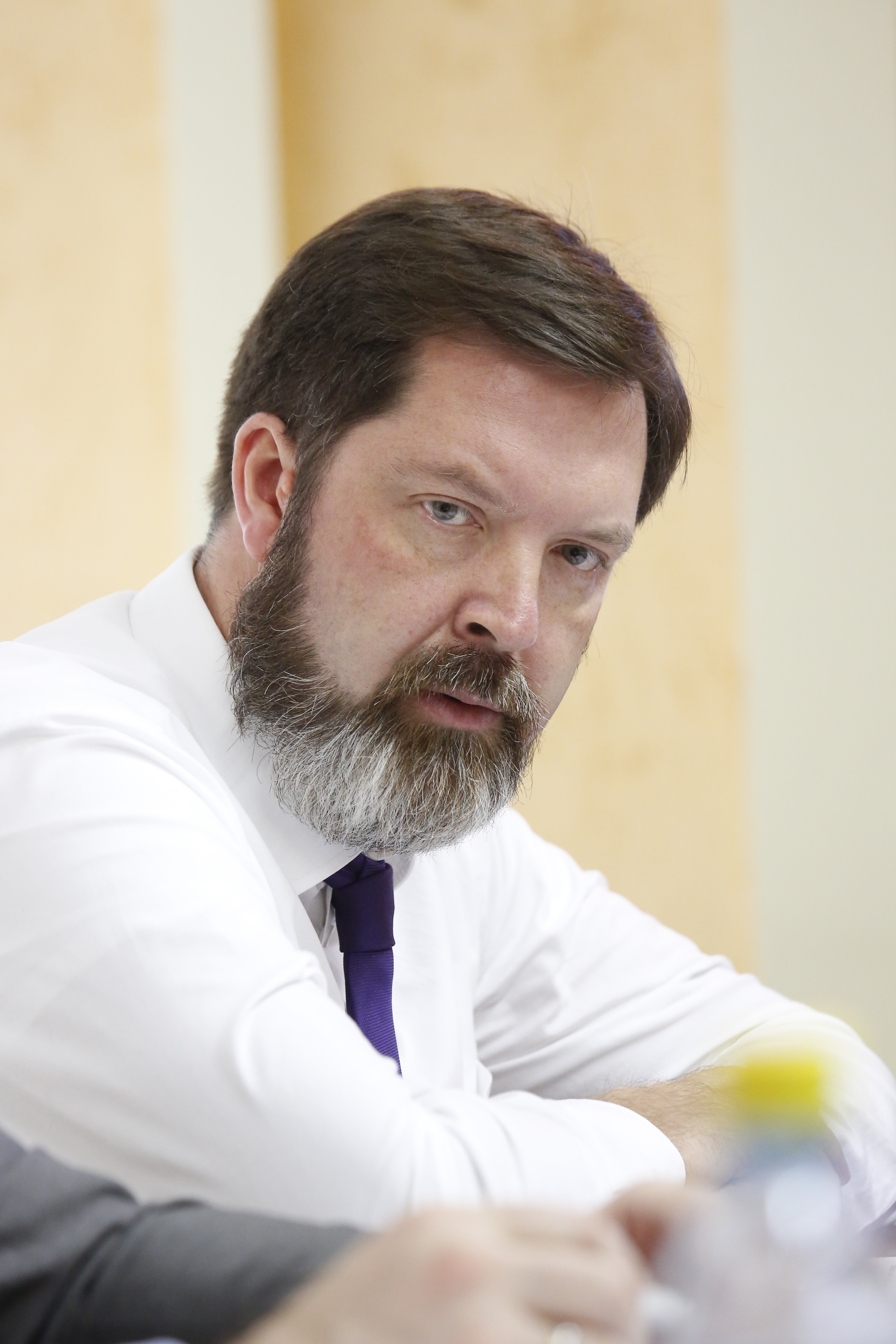
- Ksenzov in 2015
- Born: May 4, 1973 (age 53); Zaporizhzhia, Ukrainian SSR
- Occupation: President of the Moscow Handball Federation

Maxim Ksenzov (Russian: Максим Юрьевич Ксензов, born May 4, 1973, Zaporizhzhia, Ukrainian SSR) is a Russian statesman, Actual State Councillor of Russian Federation, 3rd class, and President of the Moscow Handball Federation.

== Early life and education ==
Ksenzov was born on May 4, 1973, in the city of Zaporizhzhia of the Ukrainian SSR. He graduated from the Zhukovsky Air Force Engineering Academy in 1995 as a radio engineer-researcher.

== Career ==
From 1995 to 1997 he worked as a junior researcher at the Central Scientific Research Institute of the Ministry of Defense. In 1997, he started working in the Tyumen region administration, where he consecutively held posts of Chairman of the Communications and Informatization Committee and Director of the Department of Information and Regional Relations.

He was a member of the Board of Directors of OJSC Tyumen Telecom. In 2001–2004, Ksenzov worked in the company-operator of satellite communications Gazcom (since December 1, 2008 — Gazprom Space Systems) on the positions of Director for External Relations, Deputy Commercial Director and Advisor to the General Director for work with federal and regional authorities and large corporate clients. He was directly involved in the creation and operational service of communication and broadcasting satellites Yamal 201 and Yamal-202.

In 2004 became the head of the Licensing department at the Russian Federal Surveillance Service for Compliance with the Legislation in Mass Media and Cultural Heritage Protection (Rosokhrankultura), which at that time was responsible for regulating the media; then he headed Mass Communication Permit Issuing Department at the Rossvyazzyokhrankultura, which was later reorganized into Rossvyazkomnadzor, and then — Roskomnadzor (the Federal Service for Supervision of Communications, Information Technology and Mass Media).

In July 2012 Ksenzov was appointed as deputy head of Roskomnadzor, where he managed Mass Communication Permit Issuing, Control and Supervision Department and Electronic Communications Control and Supervision Department. Ksenzov was responsible for regulating the activities of the media, as well as for control over the Internet, which increased since 2012, including the register of banned sites. In the article-investigation How Roskomnadzor is Organized, published by the online newspaper Meduza, it is noted that Ksenzov was the main public person at the agency and made the final decision on putting the sites on the block list. With reference to an anonymous source familiar with the situation in Roskomnadzor, the author also mentioned Ksenov's close interaction with the Presidential Administration. This information was corroborated indirectly by the alleged correspondence between Ksenzov and the deputy head of the Office for Internal Policy, Timur Prokopenko, allegedly received from the mobile phone of the latter and published in 2015 by the hacking group Anonymous International.

In early 2016, Ksenzov left Roskomnadzor and became deputy CEO of the “National Media Group” (NMG), and also joined the board of the Cable Television Association of Russia. Ksenzov worked in NMG until September 2016, then he moved to the position of adviser to the CEO of “Energia-Telecom”, a subsidiary of PAO S.P.Korolev Rocket and Space Corporation Energia. Later, in March 2017, Ksenzov was appointed to the position of managing director of the Information and Analytical Support Department of VEB Capital, a subsidiary of Vnesheconombank, retaining his position in “Energia-Telecom”. He is responsible for public and government relations, as well as information and analytical support.

== Handball activity ==
Ksenzov has a master of sports degree. He started his sports career in the Sports School "Zaporozhalyuminstroy". He played for the reserve team of the USSR Top League handball championship ZII (Zaporizhzhia) and CSKA (Moscow). Then he was a player of the main team of CSKA.

In 2006, together with two-time Olympic champion Alexander Tuchkin and a handball referee Valentin Sinenko, he became the founder of the Moscow Handball Federation. At the same time he was elected president of the Moscow Federation and vice-president of the Union of Handball Players of Russia.

In May 2017 he was unanimously elected to be president of the Moscow Handball Federation for a period of 5 years.
