= Ilya Sherbovich =

Russian businessman and investor (born 1974)

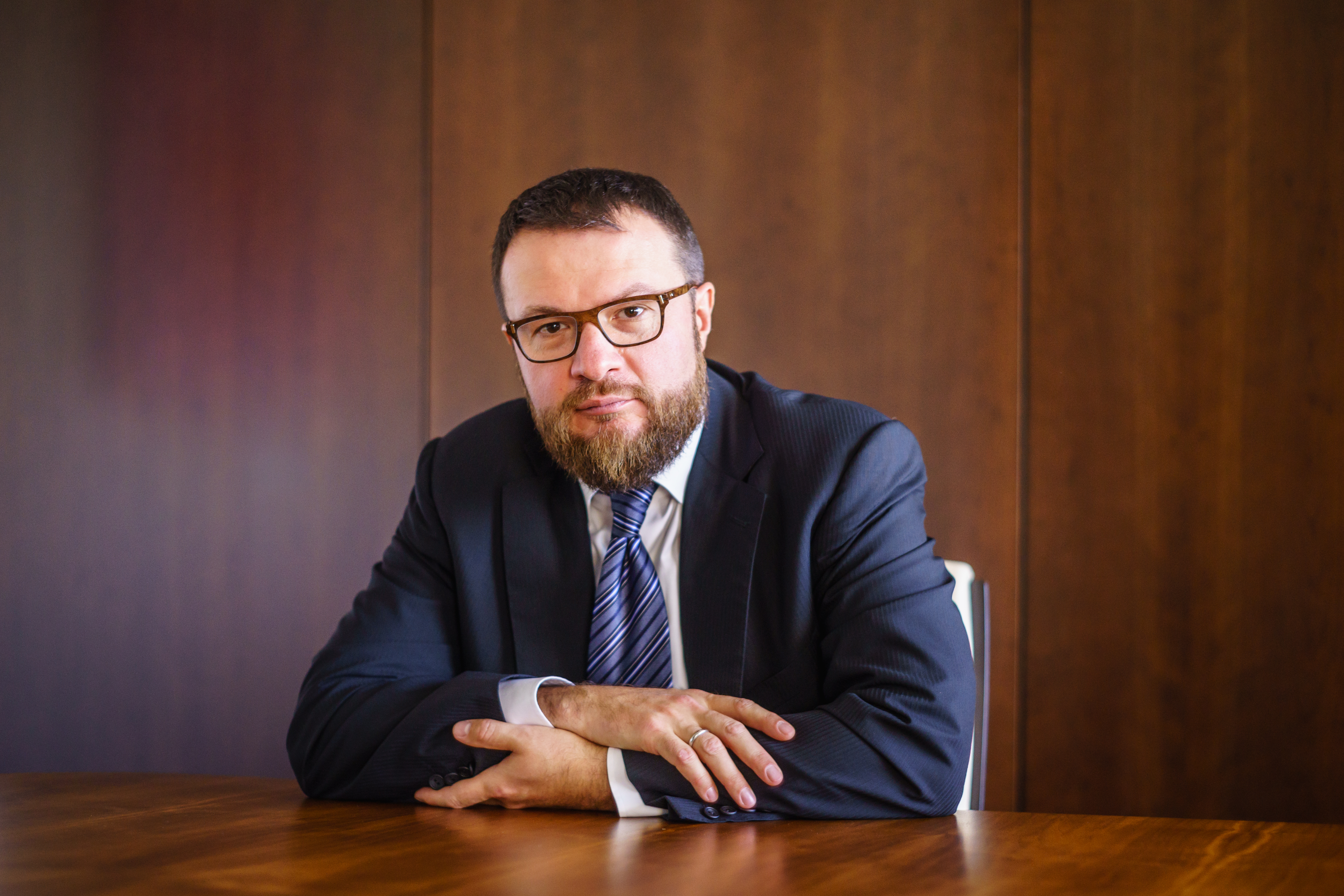
- Born: December 23, 1974 (age 51); Vladimir, Russia
- Occupations: founder, president and managing partner of UCP Investment Group

Ilya Sherbovich (Russian: Илья Викторович Щербович, born December 23, 1974, Vladimir, Russia) is a Russian investor and fly-fisherman. He is the founder, president and managing partner of UCP Investment Group and the owner of the Ponoi River Company. As a sport fisherman, Sherbovich has set 19 fly-fishing world records.

== Early life and education ==
Ilya Sherbovich was born on December 23, 1974, in the city of Vladimir (200 km South-East of Moscow). During his school years, Ilya was a successful chess player. In 1991, after graduating from high school in Vladimir, Sherbovich became a student of the Plekhanov Russian University of Economics in Moscow, graduating with a degree in Economics and business management.

== Career ==
In his second year at university, Sherbovich joined International Finance Corporation (IFC), the World Bank's investment structure focused on emerging markets. In 1994, he left IFC to join the privatization department of the Russian Federal Commission for the Securities Market where he was a consultant at the Capital Markets Surveillance Unit.

In 1995, Sherbovich joined United Financial Group (UFG) where he worked for over 12 years. UFG was founded as a brokerage firm in 1994 by Boris Fyodorov, a former Russian Deputy Prime Minister and ex-Finance Minister, and US businessman Charles Ryan, who previously worked with Fyodorov at the European Bank for Reconstruction and Development.

In 2003, Deutsche Bank acquired 40% of UFG with an option to buy the remaining 60%. This option was exercised in 2006 and Sherbovich remained President of the newly formed Deutsche UFG joint venture and simultaneously headed the Investment Banking business of the Russian branch of Deutsche Bank. During his presidency, the bank was active in Russian mergers and acquisitions and also the initial and secondary offerings market. When UFG was sold to a subsidiary of Deutsche Bank in 2006, Sherbovich was the third-largest shareholder of the firm with a stake of approximately 20%.

In 2007, Sherbovich started his own business. He invested the proceeds from the sale of his stake in UFG into a new investment company, United Capital Partners, which had been established in late 2006 by a group of former UFG employees and shareholders. In September 2007, he was appointed the President and Managing Partner of UCP and became the largest shareholder owning more than 50% of the firm’s capital. According to Forbes, in August 2013, total assets managed by the group amounted to $3.5 bn. As of summer 2016, Sherbovich owned 77.7% of the UCP Group of companies.

Ilya Sherbovich was first ranked among the wealthiest businessmen in Russia according to Forbes magazine in 2017. He holds 135th place on the 2020 list with a fortune of $750 million.

== Personal life ==
Ilya Sherbovich is married, and has a son and a daughter. In an interview with Vedomosti newspaper, Sherbovich listed three of his top life priorities: family, work and fly-fishing.

== Fly-fishing ==
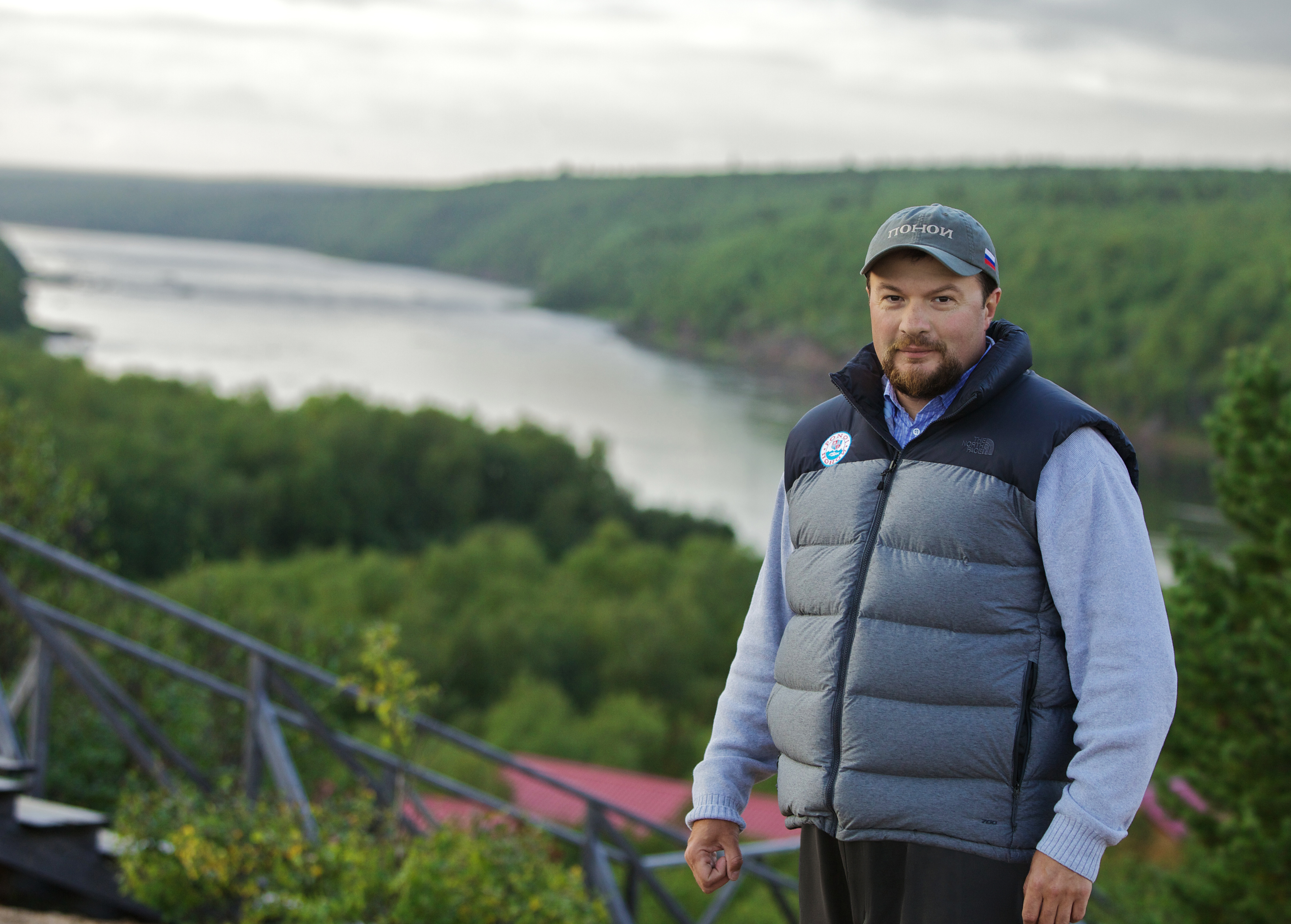
Ilya Sherbovich on the Ponoi river, 2014

Ilya Sherbovich started fishing at the age of 4 with his father and grandfather on the Klyazma river in the Vladimir Oblast. In the late 1990s he mastered fly fishing and now holds 19 world records from the International Game Fish Association (IGFA) in the fly-fishing category. The most notable of his records related to a Siberian taimen weighing 52.39 kg, caught on a fly on the Tugur river in 2021. This massive taimen is now the largest salmonid ever taken on rod and line. Earlier in 2019 Sherbovich caught on the fly a specimen of taimen over 50 kg. All fish were released after weighing.

Since 2006, Sherbovich has owned the Ponoi River Company (PRC), a fishing and tourist company in Russia's Murmansk region. PRC owns the license for sport fishing for Atlantic salmon on 80 km of the Ponoi river on the Kola Peninsula.

Sherbovich is a member of the supervisory board and one of the founders of the non-profit partnership 'Russian Salmon', an organization protecting salmon species throughout the Russian Federation. Till the end of 2022 he also was a board member of the Wild Salmon Center, the non-profit organization for the protection of the wild salmon. Since 2006, Sherbovich invested more than $20 million in salmon conservation and protection activities. Оn January 29, 2022, Sherbovich was appointed to the IGFA Board of Trustees, which includes business leaders and anglers who have contributed to the advancement of ethical, conservation-based sport fishing.

== Links ==
- Ilya Sherbovich on Instagram
- Ponoi River Company official website
