= Serge Faguet =

- Born: 4 July 1985 (age 41)
- Education: Cornell University (B.A); Stanford Graduate School of Business
- Occupation: Internet entrepreneur
- Title: CEO of Mirror AI

Serge Faguet (born July 4, 1985) is a Russian internet entrepreneur in Silicon Valley and Russia. He is the founder of Tokbox, a PaaS video communications company; Ostrovok.ru, a Russian online travel company; and Mirror AI, a computer vision consumer application.

== Early life and education ==
Born in Russia, Serge graduated with a B.A from Cornell University, and attended Stanford Graduate School of Business, from which he dropped out at the age of 21 to start Tokbox. He is a former Google employee.

== Career ==
At the age of 22, Faguet started Tokbox and raised $4.5M USD from Sequoia Capital, YouTube founder Jawed Karim and Stanford Computer Science professor Rajeev Motwani. He later left the company as part of shareholder disagreements. The company was acquired by Telefónica.

In 2010, Faguet started Ostrovok.ru, an online hotel booking company for the Russian market. He retired as CEO after 6.5 years while retaining a major stake and board positions.

Immediately after leaving Ostrovok.ru, Faguet started Mirror AI, a mobile app that uses computer vision to create personalized emojis to the consumer.

== Biohacking ==
Faguet has written a number of posts about his experiences regarding biohacking in which he claimed to have become "calmer, thinner, extroverted, healthier & happier." He talks about widely recognized practices such as intermittent fasting and interval training; as well as controversial practices such as large-scale biomarker testing, using prescription medicine without meeting medical criteria, and using illegal drugs. Faguet takes antidepressants and statins despite never having been depressed and not being at risk for heart disease. He believes that taking antidepressants will protect him from negative emotion.

In August 2021 Faguet was arrested in Moscow airport of Domodedovo for having some amphetamine and LSD; he was detained for 30 days and released from custody in September, 2021.
