= Aviasales =

Flight ticket metasearch engine

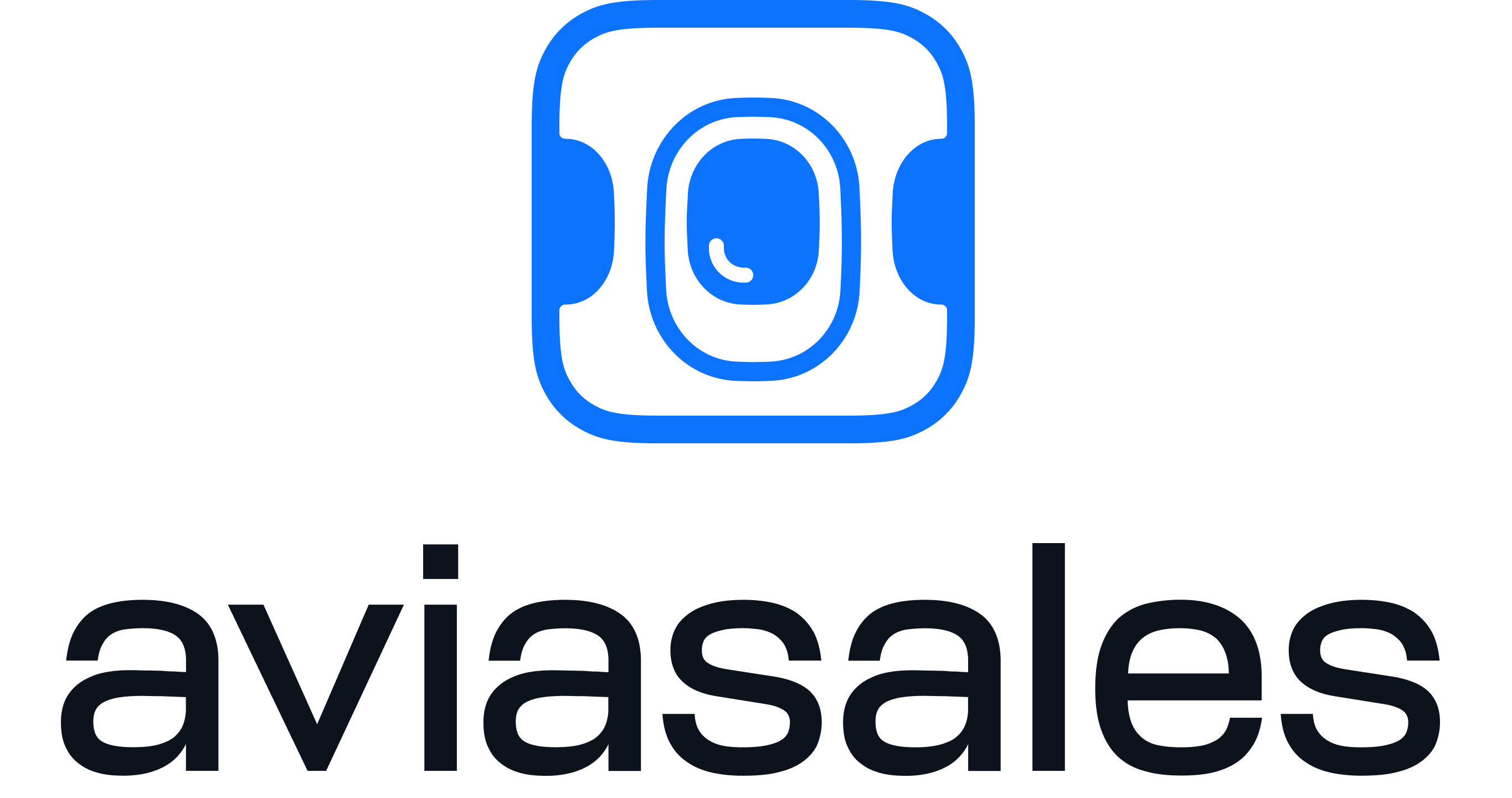
- Website type: metasearch engine
- Founder: Konstantin Kalinov
- Website: www.aviasales.com
- Commercial: Yes
- Registration: Free
- Launched: 2007; 19 years ago
- Current status: Online

Aviasales is a privately owned Russian company providing an air ticket search website. The company is registered in Hong Kong and its main operations are based in Thailand. By 2021 it had a monthly audience exceeding 15 million users. As a metasearch, Aviasales does not sell air tickets, but redirects users to airline and online travel agent websites.

The service was launched in 2007 and operates in 14 countries across Eastern Europe, the CIS, Asia, and the United States.

The company was incorporated in Hong Kong in August 2011 as Go Travel Un Limited and is headquartered on the island of Phuket, Thailand. In 2019, Skift ranked Aviasales among the top 25 most promising travel startups.

== History ==
Aviasales emerged on November 29, 2007, as a personal blog about bargain airfares. Back at the time, the website owner co-operated only with one editor, which received all money from advertisement revenue from the website ($30–50 per month). Soon after, more software developers were engaged in order to implement a search algorithm. First search engine for Aviasales was developed by Anton Kirillov, who left the company due to financial struggles of Kalinov.

After it developed into a travel service in 2008, the first ticket to be booked through Aviasales was for a flight from Moscow to Paris. By 2012, Aviasales exceeded 2 million monthly active users. That year, the company launched a travel search engine for the Chinese market, called ifeiso.com. However, the project closed down within a year.

In 2014, VC firm iTech Capital invested 10 million dollars into Aviasales. The travel metasearch brings in more than 4 million monthly unique visitors, making more than 500,000 search queries for tickets per day. In 2019, Aviasales began a strategic partnership with Booking.com. In 2020, as an immediate response to COVID-19, Aviasales introduced a 'remote first' policy for its employees, allowing staff members to choose whether to work from the company's offices or remotely.

== Products and services ==
The Aviasales mobile application for iOS was launched in May 2012. The company released a version for Android in the following year. In 2013, the service introduced an interactive map that helps users search for the cheapest flights. In July 2016, Aviasales launched a chatbot for messengers such as Slack, Facebook, Viber, and Telegram. The chatbot allows users to choose departure and destination cities, as well as the month and duration of the trip, and updates users when ticket prices increase or decrease.

Aviasales introduced baggage selection in its search results in 2017, claiming to be the first company to offer this feature. Baggage policies are highlighted for each individual airfare, and users can search for and select fares with or without checked baggage. In 2020, the company launched “Aviasales for business”, a service that helps enterprise clients with last minute changes, cancellations, and paperwork related to business trips.

In 2021, the Aviasales Plus service was launched, providing cashback for travel services, exclusive travel content, and premium support. The same year, Aviasales launched “Where you can go”, a guide to re-opened countries. “Where you can go” contains information about COVID-19 restrictions and conditions for traveling.

== Target markets ==
In the beginning of 2018, the company localized its service for Kazakhstan (https://www.aviasales.kz/). The following year, one-third of all air tickets in the country were booked through Aviasales. In 2019, the company entered the markets of Uzbekistan, Kyrgyzstan, Azerbaijan, Belarus and Ukraine. The number of bookings in the new regions grew 11-fold and the company's profit increased by 40%. Currently, Aviasales operates in 14 countries in Eastern Europe, the CIS, Asia, and the USA.

== Investments ==
In February 2014, the company closed its Series A round of investments with $10 million from iTech Capital fund. This deal was later named Deal of the Year at Venture Awards Russia. Investments were attracted for service development, product marketing, and staff expansion.

In August 2021, Aviasales received a $43 million investment from Elbrus Capital Funds and iTech Capital during its Series B round. The company plans to use the injected capital to launch new products and continue to grow in both domestic and international markets.
