= VK (service) =

Russian social media and social networking service

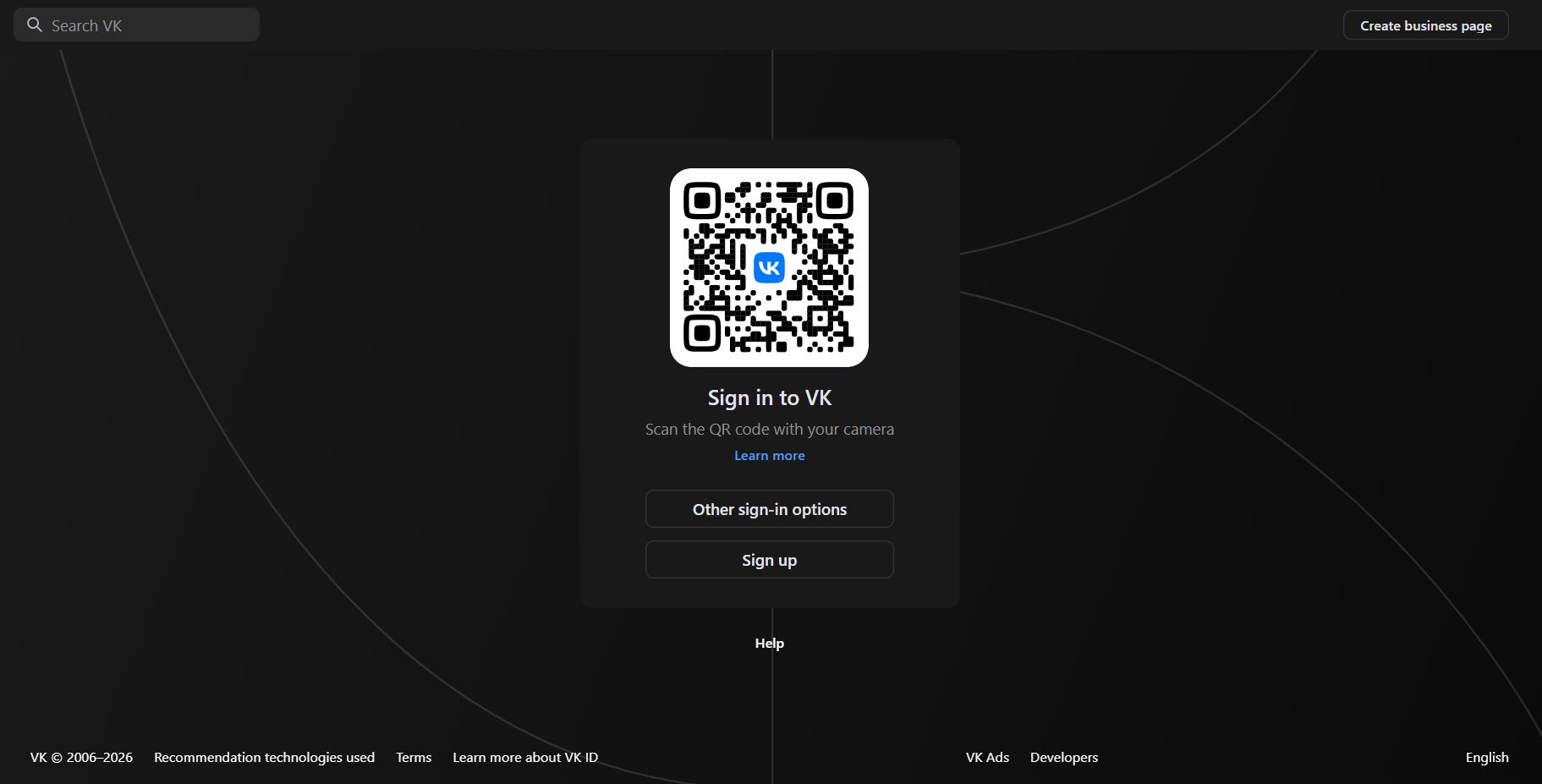
- Screenshot
- Website type: Social networking service
- Available in: 86 languages
- Founded: 10 October 2006; 20 years ago in Saint Petersburg, Russia
- Area served: Worldwide; the majority of its users are in the former USSR or in the CIS
- Creators: Pavel Durov, Nikolai Durov
- CEO: Vladimir Kiriyenko
- Revenue: 42.751 ₽ billion (2016)
- Parent: VK
- Website: vk.ru
- Registration: Required
- Launched: 10 October 2006; 20 years ago
- Current status: Active

VK (short for its original name VKontakte; Russian: ВКонтакте, lit. 'InContact') is a Russian online social media and social networking service based in Saint Petersburg. VK is available in multiple languages but it is predominantly used by Russian speakers. VK users can message each other publicly or privately, edit messages, create groups, public pages, and events; share and tag images, audio, and video; and play browser-based games.

As of August 2018, VK had at least 500 million accounts. As of November 2022, it was the sixth most popular website in Russia. The network was also popular in Ukraine until it was banned by the Verkhovna Rada in 2017.

According to Semrush, in 2024, VK was the 30th most visited website in the world. VK Video overtook YouTube's top position in monthly web traffic within Russia for the first time in December 2024, as part of a major shift towards domestic businesses.

== History ==
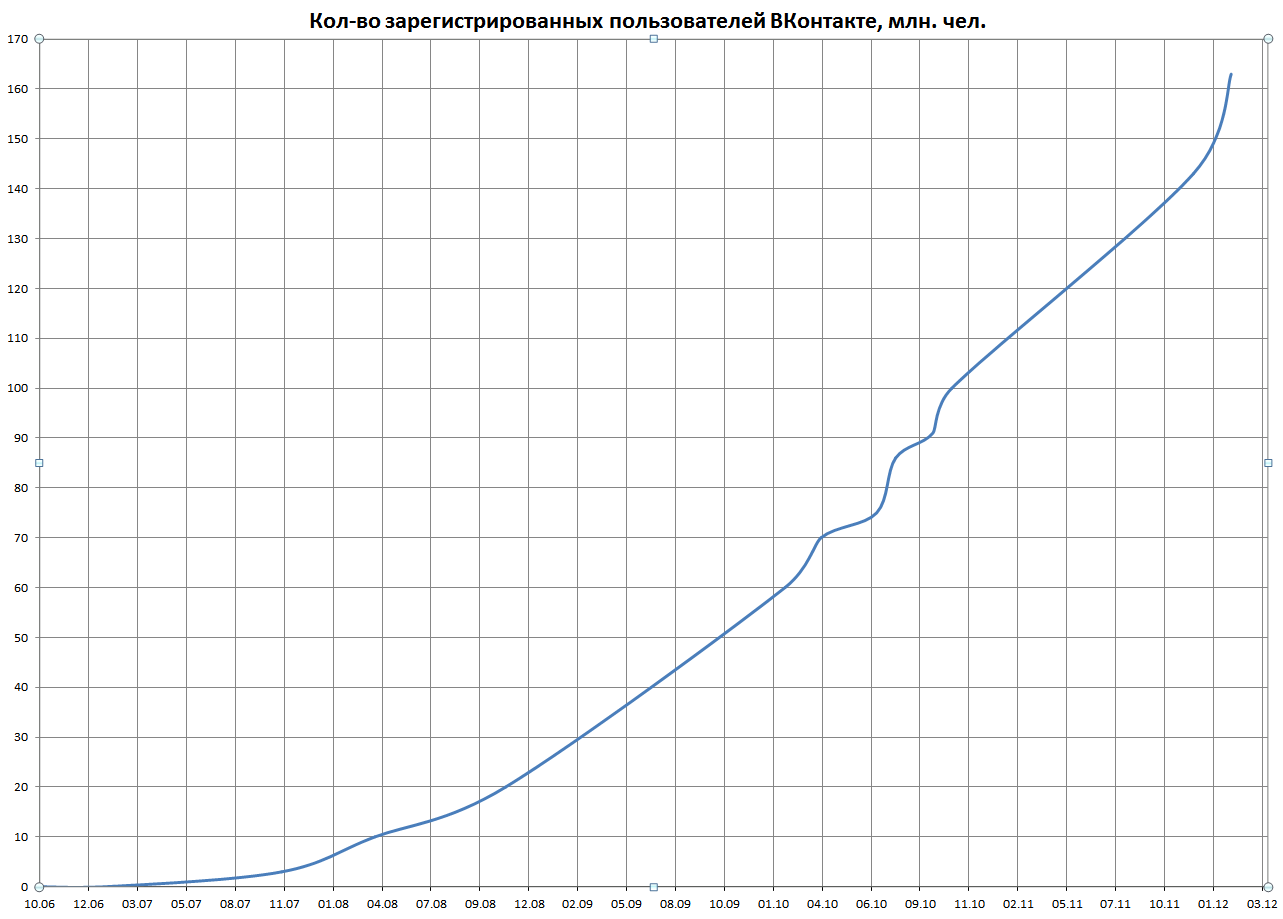
Number of Registered users (millions) on VKontakte between 2006 and 2012

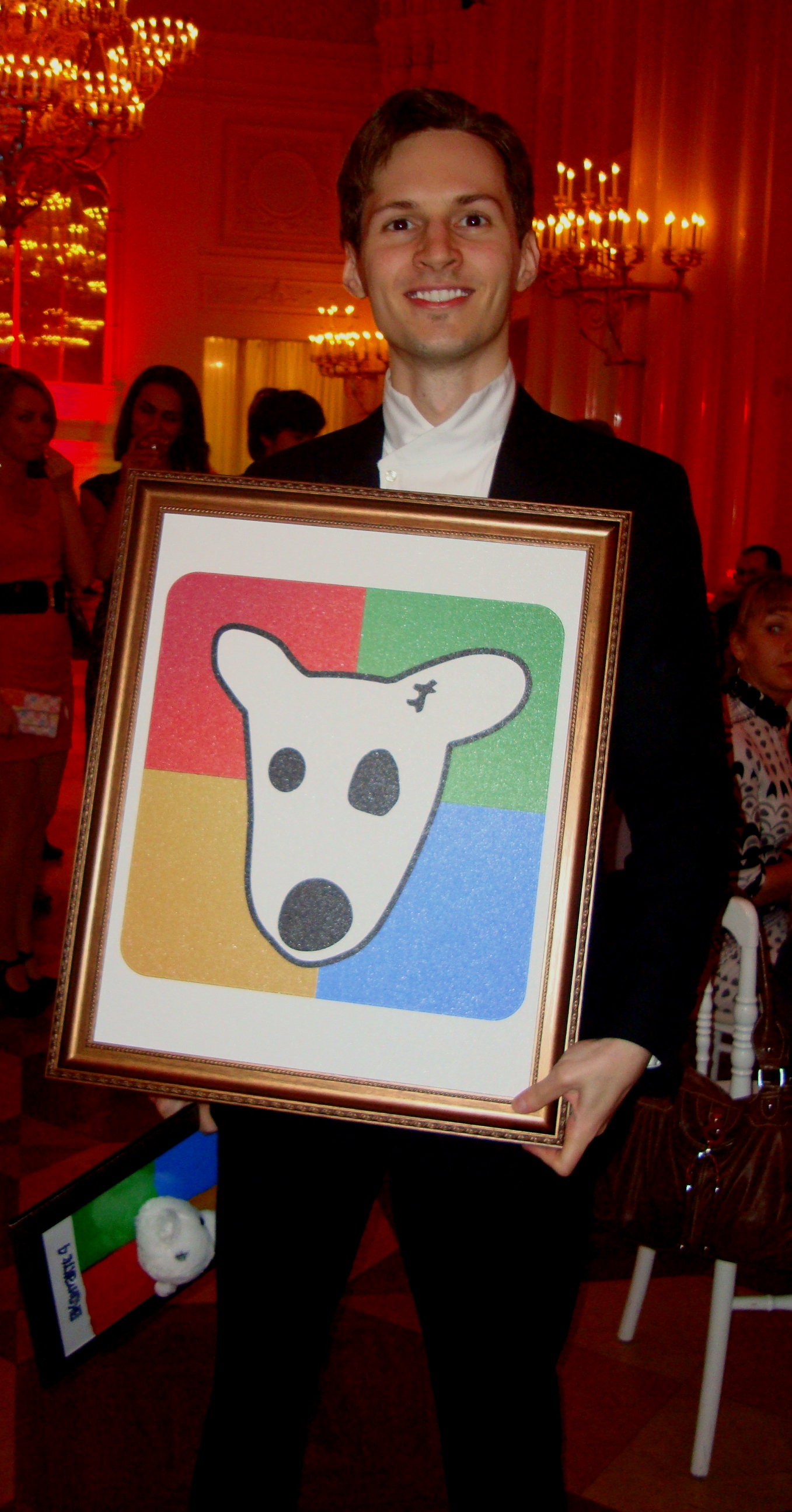
Pavel Durov, the founder of VKontakte, on his 26th birthday, 10 October 2010

VKontakte was conceived in 2006 when Pavel Durov, creator of the popular student forum spbgu.ru, met his former classmate Vyacheslav Mirilashvili in St. Petersburg after graduating from the Faculty of Philology at St Petersburg State University. Mirilashvili showed Durov the increasingly popular Facebook, after which the friends decided to create a new Russian social network. Lev Leviev, an Israeli classmate of Mirilashivili's, became the third co-founder. Mirilashvili borrowed the money from his billionaire father and became the largest shareholder. Lev Leviev took over operational management, and Durov became CEO. Pavel Durov convinced his older brother Nikolai, a multiple winner of international math and programming competitions, to develop the site.

Durov launched VKontakte for beta testing in September 2006. The following month, the domain name Vkontakte.ru was registered. The new project was incorporated on 19 January 2007 as a Russian private limited company. In February 2007 the site reached a user base of over 100,000 and was recognized as the second largest company in Russia's nascent social network market. In the same month, the site was subjected to a severe DDoS attack, which briefly put it offline. The user base reached 1 million in July 2007, and 10 million in April 2008. In December 2008 VK overtook rival Odnoklassniki as Russia's most popular social networking service.

== Website ==
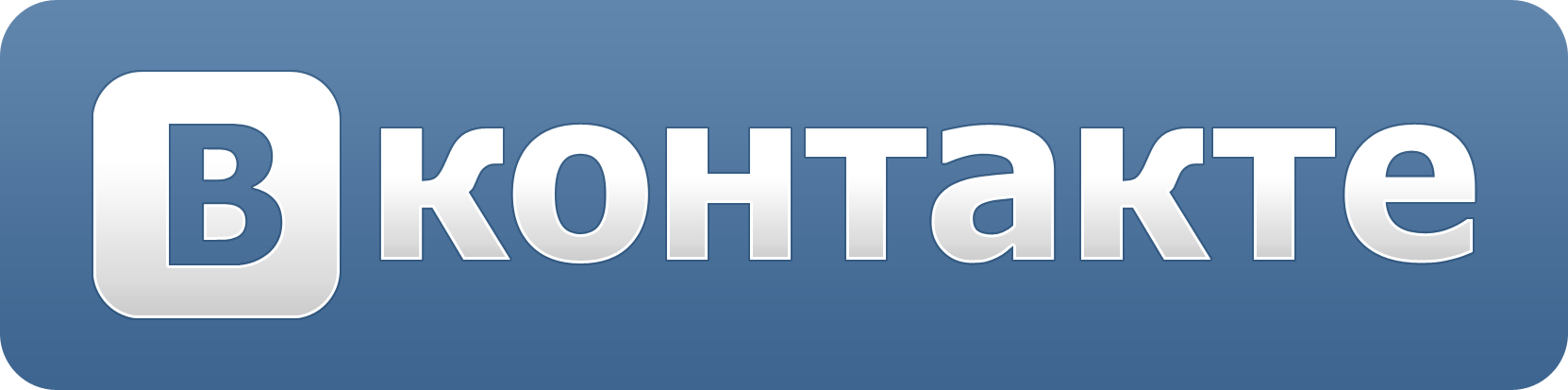
VK logo before 2015

Similar to many social networks, the platform's fundamental features revolve around private messaging, sharing photos, posting status updates, and exchanging links with friends. VK also provides tools for administering online communities and managing celebrity pages. The site allows its users to upload, search and stream media content, such as videos and music. VK features an advanced search engine, that allows complex queries for finding friends, as well as a real-time news search. VK updated its features and design in April 2016.

=== Features ===
- Messaging. VK Private Messages can be exchanged between groups of 2 to 500 people. An email address can also be specified as the recipient. Each message may contain up to 10 attachments: Photos, Videos, Audio Files, Maps (an embedded map with a manually placed marker), and Documents.
- News. VK users can post on their profile walls, each post may contain up to 10 attachments – media files, maps, and documents (see above). User mentions and hashtags are supported. In the case of multiple photo attachments, the previews are automatically scaled and arranged in a magazine-style layout. The news feed can be switched between all news (default) and most interesting modes. The site features a news-recommendation engine, global real-time search, and individual search for posts and comments on specific users' walls.
- Communities. VK features three types of communities. Groups are better suited for decentralized communities (discussion boards, wiki-style articles, editable by all members, etc.). Public pages is a news feed-orientated broadcasting tool for celebrities and businesses. The two types are largely interchangeable, the main difference being in the default settings. The third type of community is called Events, which are used for appropriately organizing concerts and events in an appropriate way.

Like button on VK (Russian version)

- Like buttons. VK like buttons for posts, comments, media, and external sites operate differently from Facebook. Liked content doesn't get automatically pushed to the user's wall, but is saved in the private Favorites section instead. The user has to press a second 'share with friends' button to share an item on their wall or send it via private message to a friend.
- Privacy. Users can control the availability of their content within the network and on the Internet. Blanket and granular privacy settings are available for pages and individual content.
- Synchronization with other social networks. Any news published on the VK wall will appear on Facebook or Twitter. Certain news may not be published by clicking on the logo next to the "Send" button. Editing a post in VK does not change the post in Facebook or Twitter and vice versa. However, removing the news in VK will remove it from other social networks.
- SMS service. Russian users can receive and reply to a private message or leave a comment for community news using SMS.
- Music. Users have access to the audio files uploaded by other users. In addition, users can upload the audio files themselves, create playlists and share audios with others by attaching to messages and wall posts. The uploaded audio files cannot violate copyright laws.

=== Popularity ===
As of May 2017, according to Alexa Internet ranking, VK is one of the most visited websites in some Eurasian countries. It is:

- 4th most visited in Russia;
- 3rd most visited in Belarus;
- 6th most visited in Kazakhstan;
- 8th most visited in Kyrgyzstan and Moldova;
- 12th most visited in Latvia.

It was the fourth most viewed site in Ukraine until, in May 2017, the Ukrainian government banned the use of VK in Ukraine. According to a study for May 2018 conducted by Factum Group Ukraine VK remained the fourth most viewed site in Ukraine, but Facebook was twice as much visited. For 2019, VK appeared as the most visited social network in Ukraine according to Alexa. According to the Internet Association of Ukraine the share of Ukrainian Internet users who visit VK daily had fallen from 54% to 10% from September 2016 to September 2019. They also claimed in November 2019 that Facebook was the most popular social network.

VK was expected to gain most of the users lost by Facebook and Instagram after they were blocked in Russia in 2022, according to a Calltouch poll.

== Ownership ==
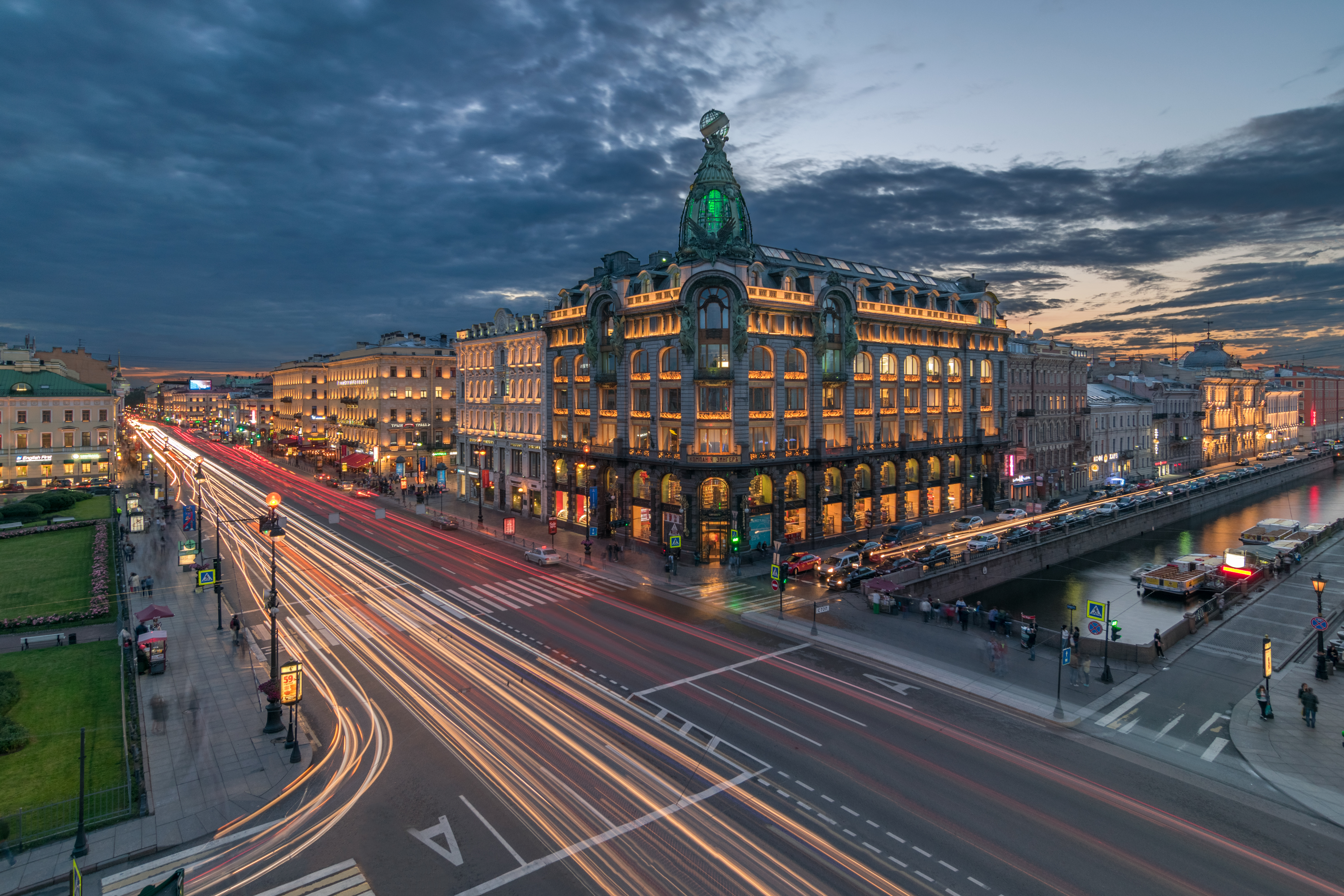
The headquarters of VK on the Nevsky Avenue in Saint Petersburg (Singer House)

Initially, founder and CEO Pavel Durov owned 20% of shares (although he had majority voting power through proxy votes), and a trio of Russian-Israeli investors Yitzchak Mirilashvili, his father Mikhael Mirilashvili, and Lev Leviev owned 60%, 10%, and 10% respectively.

In 2007, Digital Sky Technologies, an investment company managed by Yuri Milner, acquired a total of 24.99% of the shares from shareholders, investing $16.3 million. In preparation for the IPO in September 2010, DST separated international and Russian assets: the former formed the DST Global fund, while the latter, including VKontakte and rival social network Odnoklassniki, were merged into Mail.ru Group. Mail.ru Group used part of the money to acquire 7.5% of the social network for $112.5 million at a valuation of the entire project of 1.5 billion dollars. After exercising a 7.5% option in July 2011 for $111.7 million, Mail.ru Group accumulated a 39.99% stake in VKontakte.

The head of Mail.ru Group, Dmitry Grishin, voiced the company's intention to gain 100% control over VKontakte. MRG was discussing with shareholders to buy out shares from the valuation of the entire company in $2-3 billion. In the summer of 2011, Mirilashvili and Leviev were ready to accept in payment owned by Mail.ru Group shares of Facebook, Groupon, and Zynga, but the deal failed due to Durov's unwillingness to sell a stake on MRG terms. Later, the co-founders considered VKontakte's IPO as an alternative. In March 2012, Durov "accidentally" became plugged into the negotiations where Mirilashvili and Leviev discussed selling their stakes directly to Mail.ru Group's main investor, Alisher Usmanov. On the same day, Durov deleted the pages of the first co-investors, stopped contacting them, and soon announced that VKontakte would postpone its IPO indefinitely.

On 29 May 2012, Mail.ru Group announced its decision to yield control of the company to Durov by offering him the voting rights on its shares. Combined with Durov's personal 12% stake, this gave him 52% of the votes.

In April 2013, the Mirilashvili family sold its 40% share in VK to United Capital Partners for $1.12 billion, while Lev Leviev sold his 8% share in the same deal, giving United Capital Partners 48% ownership. In January 2014, VK's founder Pavel Durov sold his 12% stake in the company to Ivan Tavrin, the CEO of MegaFon, which is controlled by Alisher Usmanov. Following the deal, Usmanov and his allies controlled around 52% of the company. Shortly thereafter, the CEO of Megafon, sold his 12% stake to Mail.ru, thus allowing Mail.ru to consolidate its controlling stake of 52% in VK.

On 1 April 2014, Durov submitted his resignation to the board; at first, due to the fact the company confirmed he had resigned, it was believed to be related to the Russo-Ukrainian War which began in the previous February. However, Durov himself claimed it was an April Fool's Joke on 3 April 2014. On 21 April 2014, Durov was dismissed as CEO, claiming he failed to withdraw his letter of resignation a month earlier. Durov then claimed the company had been effectively taken over by Vladimir Putin's political faction, suggesting his dismissal was the result of both his refusal to hand over personal details of users to federal law enforcement and his refusal to hand over the personal details of people who were members of a VKontakte group dedicated to the Euromaidan protest movement. Durov then left Russia and stated that he had "no plans to go back" and that "the country is incompatible with Internet business at the moment".

On 16 September 2014, the Mail.ru group bought the remaining 48% stake of VK from United Capital Partners (UCP) for $1.5 billion, thus becoming the sole proprietor of the social network.

In December 2021, Russian state-owned bank Gazprombank and insurance company Sogaz bought out 57.3% of VK shares, thus becoming the holders of the company's controlling interest.

== Controversies ==
=== Copyright issues ===
==== Litigation ====
In 2008, the TV channel Russia-1 and its owner VGTRK sued VK over unlicensed uploads of two of its films by VK users. In 2010, this dispute was settled by the Russian High Arbitration Court in favour of the social network. The court ruled that VK is not responsible for its users’ copyright violations, taking into account that both parties agreed with the technical possibility to identify the user who posted illegal content and who, consequently, must incur the liability. Another ruling early in 2012 went partially in favor of Gala Records (now Warner Music Russia), a recording studio, when the same court ordered VK to pay $7000 for not being active enough in regard to copyrighted materials.

==== Efforts against copyright infringement ====
VK offers a content removal tool for copyright holders. Large-scale copyright holders may gain access to bulk content removal tools.

Since 2010, VK has also entered several partnerships with legal content providers such as television networks and streaming providers. The online video provider Ivi.ru secured licensing rights with major Hollywood film studios in 2012. These partnerships allow providers to remove user-uploaded content from VK and substitute it with legal embedded copies from the provider's site. This legal content can be either ad-sponsored, subscription-based, or free, depending on the provider's choices. VK does not display its own advertising in the site's music or video sections, nor in the videos themselves. In October 2013, VKontakte was cleared of copyright infringement charges by a court in Saint Petersburg. The judge ruled that the social network is not responsible for the content uploaded by its users.

In November 2014, the head of the Roskomnadzor, Maxim Ksenzov, said that VKontakte would complete the process of legalization of the content at the beginning of 2015. At that time (November 2014), negotiations between major label companies and the social network VKontakte were ongoing.

=== DDoS attacks on sites ===
Because the social network is one of the most popular and visited sites in runet, its visits can be used to make DDoS attacks on smaller sites. VK performed DDOS attacks on certain sites, making users' browsers send multiple requests to the target site without their consent. The targets were the Runet Prize voting page in 2008 and the CAPTCHA-solving service antigate.com in 2012. It was done by inserting an iframe and a piece of JavaScript code which periodically reloaded the iframe. As a countermeasure, antigate was detecting whether iframe was loaded from VK and if it were antigate had redirected request to xHamster, a pornography website. VK needed to cease the attack due to the site's use by children. VK tried to use XMLHttpRequest to solve this problem, but had forgotten about the same-origin policy. They succeeded in stopping the attack, though there were many ways to solve the problem with redirect.

=== Durov's dismissal ===
Durov was dismissed as CEO in April 2014 after he failed to retract a letter of resignation which he contended had been an April Fools' Day prank. Durov then claimed Vladimir Putin's allies had, in effect, taken over the company, and suggested his ousting was the result of his refusal to hand over personal details of users to the Russian Federal Security Service and to shut down a VK group dedicated to anti-corruption activist Alexei Navalny.

=== Suicides ===
On November 23, 2015, Renata Kambolina, a 16-year-old Russian student from Ussuriysk, took her own life. Her final social media post, shared under her pseudonym Rina Palenkova, drew widespread attention on VK. In the period following the incident, her image and final message spawned numerous internet memes and became frequently discussed within online communities, sparking a wave of romanticisation of suicide that falsely framed her as a virtual idol. Numerous copycat suicides and attempted suicides followed the event, using her final words, photo framing, or both.

On October 17, 2019, Gleb Korablyov, an 18-year-old Russian student at Moscow Aviation Institute, took his own life during a live broadcast on VK by shooting himself with a Saiga-12 shotgun. A video recording of this broadcast went viral after it was posted under the title "1444" on the GORE YouTube channel that same day; it spread widely online as a shocking video and gained notoriety among Spanish-speaking users. The video remained on the platform for several hours before moderators removed it. This video spawned numerous internet memes and an urban legend on social media, primarily because it is believed to be associated with a curse: according to rumors, the video compels viewers to take their own lives within 24 hours. Those who decide to watch it are given a special warning: if they watch the video, they will be cursed, which, it is claimed, can only be lifted by stating the date they watched it in the comments.

=== Death groups ===
In May 2016, public scrutiny intensified following investigative reports in Russian media concerning online "death groups," most notably a community known as "F57" on VK. These groups were linked to the emergence of the "Blue Whale Challenge," an internet phenomenon where anonymous coordinators allegedly used psychological manipulation to assign vulnerable teenagers a series of escalating self-harm tasks over a 50-day period, culminating in instructions to commit suicide. Prior to these investigative reports, administrators of these groups had weaponised the image and story of Kambolina to promote their communities; however, subsequent investigations confirmed she had no prior contact or involvement with the groups. The media coverage sparked a widespread moral panic across Russia. While subsequent investigations and experts questioned the direct causal link between these specific online groups and the broader rise in youth suicides, the controversy led to increased platform moderation, legislative efforts to increase punishments for inciting suicide online, and temporary access restrictions in international regions.

Following criminal investigations into the network of online administrators, Russian law enforcement arrested several individuals accused of managing these groups. In 2016, 21-year-old Philipp Budeikin, an early administrator of the F57 group who operated on VK under the pseudonym "Philipp Lis" (Fox), was detained. Budeikin eventually pled guilty to charges of inciting teenagers to commit suicide. In July 2017, a Siberian court sentenced him to three years and four months in prison. Other administrators, including 26-year-old Ilya Sidorov, were also arrested and confessed to managing similar chat groups that targeted underage users.

== Censorship ==
On 24 May 2013, it was reported in the media that the site had been mistakenly put on a list of websites banned by the Russian government. Some critics have accused the blacklist as the latest in a series of suspicious incidents to have happened to the website in recent months as a way for the Russian government to increase their stake in, and control of the site.

On 18 November 2013, following an order from the Court of Rome, VK was blocked in Italy after a complaint from Medusa Film stating that it was hosting an illegal copy of one of its films. However. in April 2015, the VK website was unblocked in Italy. While the official VK mobile Apps are no longer available on Google Play Store or Apple App Store in the European Union.

In January 2016, China banned VKontakte, claiming that it was manipulating web content and cooperating with the Kremlin. According to Russia's media watchdog, the network estimates around 300,000 users based in China. As of 14 February 2018, China authorities unblocked VKontakte and it was fully accessible in the country.

In May 2017, Ukrainian President Petro Poroshenko signed a decree to impose a ban on Mail.ru and its widely used social networks including VKontakte and Odnoklassniki as part of its continued sanctions on Russia for its annexation of Crimea and involvement in the war in Donbas. Reporters Without Borders condemned the ban, calling it a "disproportionate measure that seriously undermines the Ukrainian people's right to information and freedom of expression." VK closed its office in Ukraine's capital Kyiv in June 2017.

In December 2021, VKontakte's CEO, Boris Dobrodeev resigned from his post. Reuters linked Dobrodeev's resignation to the acquisition of VK's majority interest by two state-owned companies that happened the same month. According to one analyst, the state consolidation of VKontakte would cause greater censorship by the government.

On 12 May 2022, in connection with the sanctions imposed by the European Union (EU), NEPLP decided to limit the activity of "VKontakte" ("vk.com"), "Odnoklassniki" ("ok.ru") and "Moy Mir" ("my.mail.ru") social medias in Latvia. The decision was made because NEPLP has evidence that the platforms are owned and controlled by Yury Kovalchuk and Vladimir Kiriyenko. The mentioned persons are subject to EU sanctions in connection with undermining the territorial integrity, sovereignty and independence of Ukraine.

After the Russian invasion of Ukraine, on 26 September 2022, the VK application (as well as other applications of the holding services) was removed from the Apple App Store due to international sanctions. On 28 September, the Russian communications regulator Roskomnadzor issued a statement demanding an explanation for the removal of the VK application from the App Store. CEO Vladimir Kiriyenko was sanctioned by the United States, India, Canada, United Kingdom, European Union, Japan, Australia and various countries.

== Prosecution of users in Russia ==
In July 2012, VKontakte was accused of close cooperation with the Centre for Combating Extremism (Centre E), a unit within the Russian Ministry of Internal Affairs heavily criticized for repressing opposition activists. For publications, reposts, comments and likes posted on their VKontakte pages, dozens of Russian citizens were sentenced to fines, suspended sentences and imprisonment. Most of the cases against users are qualified as propaganda of extremism, xenophobia and Nazism. Statistically, among all the social networking services available in Russia, the users of VKontakte were targeted by police almost exclusively.

== Events and projects ==
=== Automated workplace of a civil servant ===
By 2023, on the basis of VK, the "Automated workplace of a civil servant" (АРМ ГС in Russian) was developed, to which it is planned to transfer all Russian civil servants. AWP includes mail, calendar, cloud storage, instant messenger, supports audio and video calls. It should replace Telegram, WhatsApp, Gmail, Google Docs, Zoom and Skype widely used in Russia. Thus, the Russian government intends to exclude foreign services from the public administration system. Officials were supposed to switch to "Automated workplace" from May 1, 2023.

In June 2023, the Ministry of Digital Development, Communications and Mass Media announced a competition for software developers to "scale" the workspace and provide the necessary level of cryptographic protection. It is planned to spend 9 million rubles on the project.

=== Hackathons ===
VK organized their first 24-hour Hackathon in 2015 from 31 October to 1 November. The participants were invited to develop projects united by a common idea: "Make it Simple!" (Russian: «Упрощайте!»). 34 teams took part in the competition. A prize pool of 300 thousand rubles was split among the winners.

The second VK Hackathon took place from 26 to 27 November 2016. The participants developed projects for the community app platform. The "Search for Lost Cats" (Russian: «Поиск пропавших котиков») app won the "Developers' Choice" category. The prize pool for the event was 300 thousand rubles.

The third VK Hackathon took place from 20 to 22 October 2017 with 320 participants competing in the event. The prize pool was one million rubles. An application designed to help users navigate the State Hermitage Museum won the "Culture" category.

=== Start Fellows ===
In 2011, Pavel Durov and Yuri Milner created Start Fellows, a grant program founded to support projects in the field of technology. In 2014, VK took over the Start Fellows program and made it more systematic. The grant was provided to 3 companies each month and included project consultation from VK along with 25 thousand rubles a month for advertisement on the VK platform. Winners of the grant include "University Schedules" (Russian: «Расписание вузов»), a scheduling app, LiveCamDroid, a mobile streaming service, HTML Academy, an educational project, and others.

VK re-launched the project in 2017. Only active projects with an earnings model could submit applications. 327 grant applications were received but only 67 of them passed the initial screening. The total prize pool was 2.5 million rubles.

=== VK Cup ===
The first VK Cup, a programming championship for young programmers aged 13–23, was held on 16 July 2012 in Saint Petersburg, Russia.

VK and Codeforces co-organized the second VK Cup programming championship, which took place from 24 to 27 July 2015. The winners received a total of 1,048,576 or 2^{20} rubles (an amount related to round binary numbers).

The third VK Cup took place from 1 to 4 July 2016 and had a prize pool of 2.5 million rubles.

VK and Codeforces co-organized the fourth VK Cup which took place from 8 to 9 July 2017. Teams from 52 countries applied to take part in the competition. The prize pool for the competition was 2.5 million rubles.

=== VK Music Awards ===
The first VK Music Awards ceremony took place on 25 December 2017. The VK Music Awards were produced by Timur Bekmambetov and the Bazelevs Company with Pavel Volya hosting the event. The awards ceremony was held in the form of an online live stream. Any VK user could watch the broadcast live. After the ceremony, a private concert was held in the Vegas City Hall in Moscow. Tickets to the event could be won through a contest held in the VK Music community. VK Music Awards winners were determined by the number of plays an artist's song got on VK and the BOOM app. The names of the 30 award winners were published on the official VK Music Awards community page and on the BOOM app website. "Rosé Wine" (Allj and Feduk), "Lambada" (T-Fest and Scriptonite), and "My Half" (MiyaGi and Endspiel) topped the list of most listened to songs. The official pages of all award winners have been marked with a special symbol.

=== VK Fest ===
Since 2015, VK has held a yearly 2-day open-air music and entertainment festival. This festival traditionally takes place on a weekend in July at the 300th Anniversary Park (Russian: Парк имени 300-летия Санкт-Петербурга) in St. Petersburg, Russia. According to data from the organizer, 70 thousand people attended the festival in 2016, with the number rising to 85 thousand attendees in 2017. In 2017, around 40 artists and groups performed on 3 stages, including Little Big, The Hatters, and others. Bloggers and other famous individuals, such as Dmitry Grishin, Timur Bekmambetov, and Mikhail Piotrovsky (speakers at the 2017 festival), are also an important part of the festival. More than 1.5 million people watched the festival's official live stream.

== See also ==
- Cyworld
- Facebook
- Internet in Russia
- Myspace
- Qzone
- List of social networking websites

== Literature ==
- Friedrichsen, Mike; Mühl-Benninghaus, Wolfgang, eds. (2013). Handbook of Social Media Management. Berlin: Springer. ISBN 978-3-642-28897-5.
