= Yitzchak Mirilashvili =

Israeli entrepreneur (born 1984)

- יצחק מירילשוילי
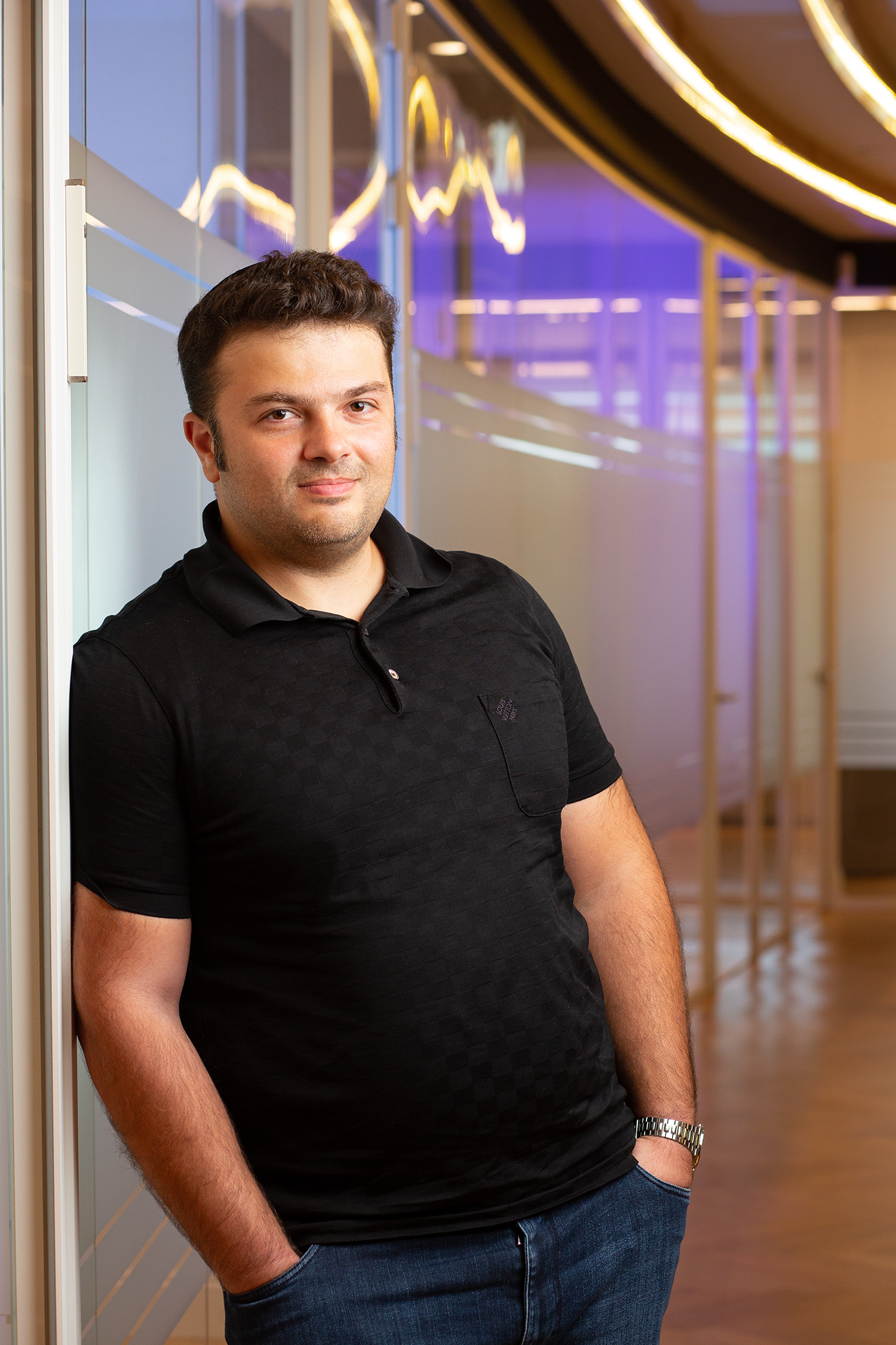
- Yitzchak Mirilashvili
- Born: 1984 (age 41–42); Leningrad, Russian SFSR, Soviet Union
- Other name: Slava Mirilashvili
- Education: Tufts University
- Occupation: Businessman
- Known for: Business and philanthropy
- Notable work: Co-founder of VK, controlling shareholder of Israel's Channel 14.

Yitzchak Mirilashvili (born Vyacheslav Mikhailovich Mirilashvili; Hebrew: יצחק מירילשוילי; born 1984) is an Israeli investor, entrepreneur and philanthropist. He is a co-founder of VK (Vkontakte.ru), Russia's largest social network. Mirilashvili lives in Israel, where he oversees his businesses as well as various charitable foundations and causes. Mirilashvili is the controlling shareholder of Israel's Channel 14 and in The economy channel.

== Early life ==
Mirilashvili was born in Saint Petersburg, Russia in 1984. His father, Michael Mirilashvili, is Georgian Jewish and a Russian-Georgian-Israeli businessman and philanthropist. He moved to Israel as a child and attended high school there. Mirilashvili attended Tufts University in the United States, graduating with a degree in economics in 2006.

== Career ==
=== VK ===
Mirilashvili co-founded VK in 2006 with friends Lev Leviev and Pavel Durov, where he served as chairman and majority shareholder. VK became Russia's largest social network. with over 500 million active users. Mirilashvili, Leviev and Durov raised capital from Digital Sky Technologies, headed by Yuri Milner. In 2013, at the age of 29, Mirilashvili sold his remaining shares in VKontakte for a valuation in excess of $1 billion, making him one of Israel's wealthiest citizens.

=== Plarium ===
Mirilashvili was a 35% shareholder in Plarium, an F2P mobile and online gaming company founded in 2009. Mirilashvili held a material stake in Plarium, which in 2017 was sold to Aristocrat, a publicly held Australian company, for an estimated $500 million.

=== The Kuf Dalet Group ===
Mirilashvili is the sole shareholder and chairman of The Kuf Dalet Group, a holding company that manages his group's investment portfolio and is headquartered in Herziliya. Kuf Dalet invests in real estate and infrastructure primarily within the United States, Israel, Russia and Europe.

Kuf Dalet is the controlling shareholder in Rothstein Real Estate Co, Ltd., an Israeli residential real-estate development company traded on the Tel Aviv Stock Exchange and a member of the TA Real-Estate Index.

The group's holdings in Israel include commercial and retail portfolios of properties in Tel Aviv, Herzliya and adjacent suburbs. In the United States, Mirilashvili's real estate portfolio is concentrated in New York City as well in the Midwest and Southeast regions, with commercial and retail assets.

Yesodot Private Equity was launched by the group in 2014, creating a fund for investing in energy storage, development and infrastructure projects in Israel and abroad. Yesodot acquired an 18% stake in Israel's IPM Be'er Tuvia power plant development project in 2018, which is meant to produce 451 MW and supply 3.5% of Israel's electricity needs. Prior to this transaction, Yesodot completed a private equity investment in an existing solar panel business owned by the publicly- listed Israeli conglomerate Shikun & Binui, which produces 24 MW.

=== Other projects ===
In addition, Mirilashvili is the controlling shareholder in Israel's Channel 14, a broadcast news channel which began as a Jewish heritage programming outlet that targets the conservative-leaning political spectrum.

In 2019, Mirilashvili was included in TheMarker's list of top 100 influential people in Israel in the field of business.

== Philanthropy ==
Yitzhak and his wife Vika donate millions of dollars each year, through their charitable foundation, to hundreds of educational and welfare institutions in Israel and around the world.

=== Yaffa and Aryeh Deri-related donations ===
Mirilashvili has made donations to organizations run by Yaffa Deri, wife of Aryeh Deri. In 2017, Israeli authorities investigated the Deris; Mirilashvili and his father were among 16 prominent Israelis questioned as part of this investigation. In 2018, the police recommended the prosecution of Aryeh Deri; Mirilashvili was found to have done nothing wrong.

=== Chabad and Channel 14 ===
Yitzchak Mirilashvili and his father have donated approximately NIS 150 million per year to bodies associated with Chabad Hassidism and religious Zionism. Yitzhak Mirilashvili, who is a member of the Chabad community, is the owner of Channel 14, a TV channel considered to be close to his own worldview and increasingly that of the American Fox News channel.
