= Arrest and indictment of Pavel Durov =

2024 charges against Russian businessman

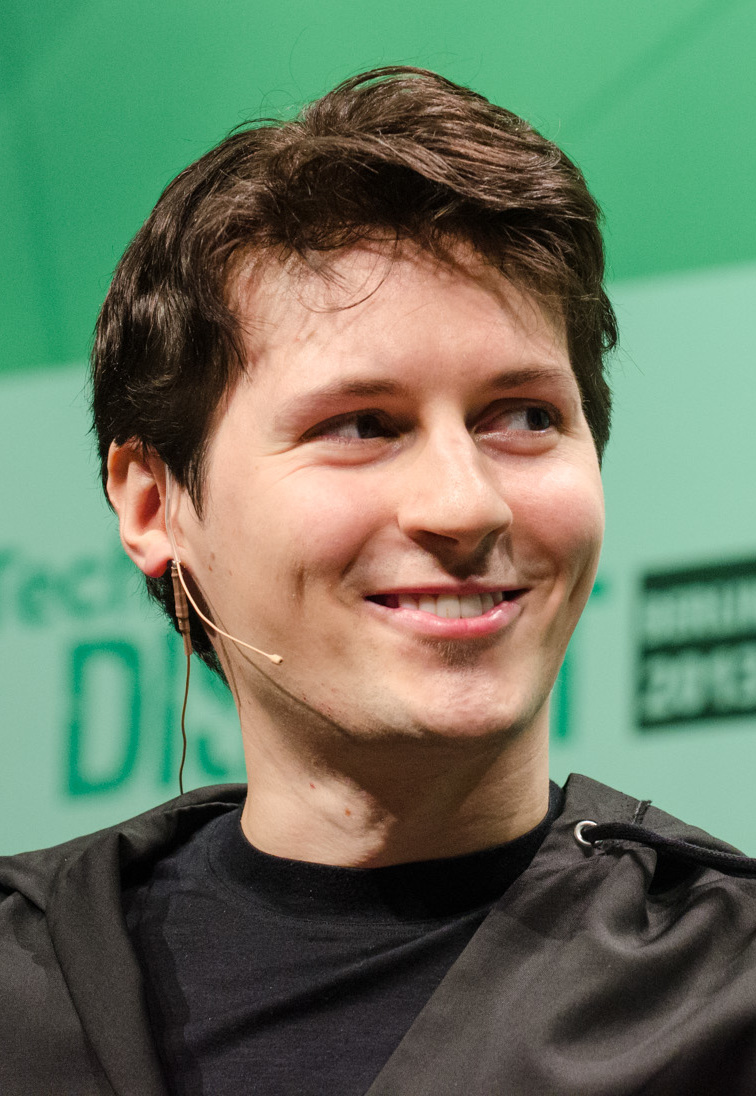
- Pavel Durov at TechCrunch Disrupt Europe, Berlin, 2013
- Date: 24 August 2024
- Time: 20:00 (CEST)
- Location: Paris–Le Bourget Airport
- Cause: Telegram messenger moderation policy
- Target: Pavel Durov
- Participants: Julia Vavilova
- Outcome: Indicted on 28 August 2024, placed under judicial supervision, banned from leaving France
- Charges: Twelve charges, including complicity in child sexual exploitation and drug trafficking on Telegram due to insufficient moderation

On 24 August 2024, Pavel Durov, a co-founder of the Telegram messaging service and the social network VK, was arrested after landing at Le Bourget Airport. The arrest was part of a preliminary investigation by the French National Judicial Police. On 28 August, Durov was indicted on twelve charges, including complicity in the distribution of child exploitation material and drug trafficking, was barred from leaving France, and was placed under judicial supervision.

The arrest of a technology platform CEO due to issues with Telegram moderation was described by University of Toronto policy researcher John Scott-Railton as "unprecedented". It prompted protest and outcry from free-speech activists and Telegram channels against the French government. The arrest also led to a deterioration in French–Russian relations. Russian diplomats accused French authorities of refusing to give information on the arrest, proposed measures to return Durov to Russia or the United Arab Emirates, and said that French–Russian relations had "reached a nadir".

In March 2025, Durov requested to modify conditions of his supervision and an investigating judge allowed Durov to temporarily leave France. Durov left France in the same month. Starting in July, he was permitted to leave France for up to two weeks at a time.

== Background ==
Pavel Durov is a Russian entrepreneur known for co-founding and being the chief executive officer (CEO) of Telegram messenger, offering end-to-end encryption in messages, voice and video calls.

In 2018, Russia attempted to block Telegram, after the company refused to cooperate with Russian security services. The block order was lifted in 2020, after Telegram agreed to apply measures to "counter terrorism and extremism" on the platform.

Telegram is used for both private communication between individuals and for social media with mass groups and channels. It has minimal restrictions on content (only calls to violence, illegal forms of pornography and scamming are forbidden), and has been used by various organizations for recruitment and coordination. Use of the app has been linked to pro-democracy protests in Belarus, Russia, Hong Kong and Iran, as well as to the dissemination of state propaganda and violent rhetoric in oppressive regimes, the promotion of extremist views, and the digitalization of services provided by government entities and private businesses.

While Telegram made efforts to ban illegal content such as child abuse and pro-terrorist channels, including a partnership with Europol to eliminate IS presence on the platform, communities of anti-vax, far-left, far-right, and other extremist users are still found on the app. Such content is usually linked to Telegram allowing misinformation on the platform, which Durov has justified by saying that, "In my 20 years of managing discussion platforms, I noticed that conspiracy theories only strengthen each time their content is removed by moderators."

As a result of its laissez-faire content policies and mass reach, Telegram is widely used by extremists, propagandists, and conspiracy theorists, with VSquare journalists referring to it as an "ecosystem for the radicalisation of opinion". The app was used by far-right demagogues to coordinate and execute anti-immigrant riots and protests across the United Kingdom in late July to early August following the stabbing deaths of three children at a dance class in Southport. The Hope Not Hate anti-racism advocacy group referred to Telegram as the "app of choice" such far-right and anti-immigrant groups and "a cesspit of antisemitic content" due to its prominent lack of moderation and the platform's idleness towards trying to limit extremist rhetoric and acts.

In August 2024, Politico reported that French authorities had issued arrest warrants for Durov and his brother Nikolai in March. Durov had reportedly avoided traveling to Europe due to potential legal risks, and instead chose to travel to the United Arab Emirates and in South America.

== Arrest and charges ==
The arrest took place on 24 August 2024, in Paris at about 8 pm local time, when he exited his private jet on the runway at Paris–Le Bourget Airport at the end of a flight to France from Azerbaijan, where it's speculated he met with Vladimir Putin—however a source linked to Russian security forces claimed that Putin refused the meeting and in a press conference Kremlin spokesperson, Dmitry Peskov, replied that Durov and Putin did not meet. The arrest was carried out by the Air Transport Gendarmerie of France and by France's National Anti-Fraud Office investigators.

Durov was accompanied by a woman and a bodyguard at the time of his arrest. A source noted that "perhaps he had a feeling of impunity", despite probably being aware of the arrest warrant against him in France. Reports also indicated that Durov was on the list of individuals wanted by French authorities, and his arrest was due to his failure to cooperate with judicial officials, including issues related to Telegram's activities. He was taken into custody, and will stand trial as a French citizen. Although there was initially no official confirmation of Durov's arrest from French authorities, a police source stated that prior to Durov's arrival to Paris, French police noted that he was on the flight's passenger list with an arrest warrant on him, leading to them arresting him.

The arrest warrant was issued in conjunction with France's Office Mineurs, an agency centered around preventing violence against minors, and coordinated with other French judicial agencies. French authorities claim that Telegram, due to its lack of moderation and the use of disposable numbers and cryptocurrencies, has become a breeding ground for fraud and other criminal activity. As of 25 August 2024, Durov was accused of complicity and negligence involving Telegram, where serious crimes, including drug trafficking, child sexual exploitation, money laundering, concealment, and fraud, occur. These charges were complicated by encrypted messages, which exacerbated the complicity charges. If Durov is convicted of the charges, he could face up to 20 years in prison.

On 28 August, Durov was charged on twelve counts, including violations related to drug trafficking, child exploitation, money laundering and nine other crimes. On the same day Durov was released from custody due to the expiration of the maximum allowable detention (96 hours) and placed under the judicial supervision, with an obligation to post a 5 million euro bail, a ban from leaving France, and the obligation to report to a police station twice a week. At the same time, an investigation into alleged "serious violence" against one of his children in Paris was opened against him by the Juvenile Office (OFMIN) of the Central Directorate of the Judicial Police.

In March 2025, an investigating judge accepted Durov's request to modify conditions of his supervision and allowed him to temporarily leave France for "several weeks". On 15 March 2025, Durov departed France with the authorities' permission. Starting on 10 July, he was permitted to leave France for up to two weeks at a time, as long as he informed the judge one week in advance. His travel ban was fully revoked in November 2025.

== Analysis ==
The Guardian technology editor Alex Hern reported that some people feared the arrest could result in other platforms, messaging apps, and social media networks choosing to "over-moderate and over-censor", to prevent their employees or executives from being arrested and charged in a similar situation to Durov. Some people also believed the arrest would expand the implementation of end-to-end encryption, to make it more difficult for state authorities and intelligence agencies to uncover private and confidential information.

== Aftermath ==
In September 2024, Telegram announced that it would begin to hand over users' IP addresses and phone numbers to authorities who have search warrants or other valid legal requests.

== Reactions ==
=== Telegram ===
Telegram released an official statement following its CEO's arrest: "Telegram abides by EU laws, including the Digital Services Act – its moderation is within industry standards and constantly improving (...) Telegram's CEO Pavel Durov has nothing to hide and travels frequently in Europe. It is absurd to claim that a platform or its owner are responsible for abuse of that platform. We're awaiting a prompt resolution of this situation."

On his personal Telegram channel, Durov stated on September 4 that "the claims in some media that Telegram is some sort of anarchic paradise are absolutely untrue. We take down millions of harmful posts and channels every day. (...) However, we hear voices saying that it’s not enough. Telegram’s abrupt increase in user count to 950M caused growing pains that made it easier for criminals to abuse our platform. That’s why I made it my personal goal to ensure we significantly improve things in this regard. We’ve already started that process internally". In the days following, the 'People Nearby' feature was dropped and Telegram started sharing certain user information to in response to law enforcement agencies' requests.

=== In France ===
On 26 August 2024, President of France Emmanuel Macron stated that there was "no political motive" for Durov's arrest, and called any statements to the contrary "false information". Macron's statements marked the first official direct acknowledgement of Durov's arrest from a French official. Macron also said that, "More than anything else, France is committed to freedom of expression and communication, innovation and entrepreneurship." "In a state governed by the rule of law, on social networks as in real life, freedoms are exercised within a framework established by law to protect citizens and respect their fundamental rights."

=== In Russia ===
==== State responses ====
Former President of Russia Dmitry Medvedev stated that he believed Durov "miscalculated" by trying to leave Russia and thinking that the police and secret services of other nations would be more permissive of his actions.

Russian politician Maria Butina, who was convicted in the U.S. of being an unregistered foreign agent, referred to Durov as a "political prisoner – a victim of a witch-hunt by the West" and asserted that his arrest by French and European authorities meant that "freedom of speech in Europe is dead". She further stated that Durov's arrest was done by the Western world to use Durov as a hostage to "blackmail Russia" and "all the users of Telegram" as means to take over control of the Telegram platform and block Russian networks and viewpoints from Western audiences.

==== French–Russian relations ====
Russian international representative Mikhail Ulyanov and multiple other Russian politicians immediately stated that France was taking actions like a dictatorship would. Ulyanov wrote on his Twitter/X profile: "Some naive persons still don't understand that if they play [a] more or less visible role in [the] international information space, it is not safe for them to visit countries which [are moving] towards much more totalitarian societies." These statements were noted by Reuters journalists to be markedly similar to criticism the Russian government faced in 2018 when attempting to put a ban on Telegram.

The Russian Ministry of Foreign Affairs reported that the Russian Embassy in France took steps in order clarify the circumstances behind Durov's apprehension. The Russian embassy stated that as of 25 August 2024, France had "avoided engagement" regarding the circumstances and reasoning behind Durov's arrest, and that the embassy began conversations with Durov's lawyer.

Russian lawmakers including Russian Duma Deputy Speaker Vladislav Davankov accused French authorities of arresting Durov for political purposes and in order to acquire confidential information from Telegram users in private chats and channels. He urged all Russian citizens to delete all private correspondence and personal information on the platform so that Western authorities could not exploit it. He further proposed that if France refused to release him from custody, that Russia should make "every effort" to relocate him to the United Arab Emirates or Russia based on his wishes.

On 27 August, Russian Foreign Minister Sergei Lavrov stated that bilateral relations between France and Russia had "reached a nadir" as a result of the arrest and extended detainment of Durov.

==== Accusations of Western espionage ====
Russian newspaper Nezavisimaya Gazeta expressed fear of the possibility of France using the arrest to probe into private messages and provide them to defensive organizations such as NATO. The newspaper Moskovskij Komsomolets said it feared that "Western intelligence services could obtain the messenger's encryption keys" and that "Telegram might become a tool of NATO" if Durov is forced by French prosecution and state law enforcement to de-encrypt chats that "contain a huge amount of vitally important, strategic information" so that French and European intelligence agencies can exploit them. It also stated that French authorities could forcibly shut down the platform and thus sever much of the communications and archived plans used by the Russian army, preventing them from planning and coordinating operations.

==== Public responses ====
Following Durov's arrest and detainment, Russian-American whistleblower Edward Snowden released several public statements strongly condemning the actions of French prosecutors:

The arrest of [Pavel Durov] is an assault on the basic human rights of speech and association. I am surprised and deeply saddened that Macron has descended to the level of taking hostages as a means for gaining access to private communications. It lowers not only France, but the world.

— Edward Snowden

Ivan Zhdanov, the director of Navalny's Anti-Corruption Foundation, said that, "The charges of drug trafficking, pedophilia, and fraud look weak. This indicates that his arrest really is linked to his refusal to cooperate with the authorities." Many Russian and pro-Russia public figures strongly condemned the arrest, with several pro-Russian bloggers calling for public protests and demonstrations in solidarity with Durov and against the governments of France and the European Union.

Most of these protests were done individually to avoid triggering a Russian law outlawing unauthorized group protests by penalty of fifteen days in prison or a fine for a first offense. Among these, protesters demonstrated in front of the French embassy to Russia in Moscow, placing paper airplanes representing Telegram's logo around the building. One protester who held a sign saying for France to not "follow in Putin's footsteps" in reference to his restrictions on free speech was detained by Russian police officers.

=== In United Arab Emirates ===
The UAE's Ministry of Foreign Affairs released a statement that said it was "closely following" the case of Pavel Durov, an Emirati citizen, and that it had "submitted a request to the French government to provide him with all consular services urgently".

=== Others ===
X chairman Elon Musk quipped: "It's 2030 in Europe and you're being executed for liking a meme." American entrepreneur and investor Balaji Srinivasan tweeted that Pavel Durov's "crime" "appears to be enabling free speech online". English-American entrepreneur Paul Graham, one of the founders of the startup accelerator Y Combinator, tweeted, "It's hard to imagine a country both arresting the founder of Telegram and being a major startup hub." Rumble CEO Chris Pavlovski tweeted, "France has threatened Rumble, and now they have crossed a red line by arresting Telegram's CEO, Pavel Durov, reportedly for not censoring speech. Rumble will not tolerate this behavior and will use every legal means available to defend freedom of expression, a universal human right."

Tucker Carlson, a right-wing American political commentator, spoke out on his X social media page regarding the arrest of Pavel Durov, stating that the event illustrated the threat to freedom of speech in the modern world. Carlson noted that Durov was forced to leave Russia due to pressure from the authorities, and claimed that his arrest in France was an attempt by Western states to restrict independent platforms such as Telegram due to his claiming that he refused to censor information for the sake of governments and intelligence agencies.

Ukrainian film director and producer Alexander Rodnyansky said that "Durov's arrest is a gift to Vladimir Putin", who, he said, could point to the arrest to show a lack of freedom of speech in Western countries.

Natalia Krapiva, a lawyer at the U.S.-based digital rights group Access Now, said that French authorities could try to force Durov to provide Telegram's encryption keys to decrypt private messages, "which Russia has already tried to do in the past".

Lega Deputy Prime Minister of Italy Matteo Salvini stated in a public statement posted to Facebook that, "In Europe we are now under censorship ... Long live freedom, of thought and speech. Who will be the next to be gagged? The great (and inconvenient) Elon Musk?"

John Scott-Railton, a senior researcher for Citizen Lab at the University of Toronto, stated that the arrest of a CEO of a widespread platform by a government based on issues related to platform moderation was "unprecedented", clarifying that "arrests of employees of big platforms over moderation & access are rare".

British politician and broadcaster Nigel Farage commented on the arrest, stating: “The arrest of Pavel Durov is worrying. Telegram is a secure free speech app. It may have some bad actors, but then all platforms do. What next… the arrest of Elon Musk?”

=== Pavel Durov's first comments ===
In his first interview on June 9, 2025, since his arrest on August 24, 2024, at Le Bourget Airport near Paris, Durov told Tucker Carlson: "So it was very disconcerting for me to be detained in Paris and to learn that Telegram had made a mistake or had not processed certain requests." When Tucker Carlson questioned Durov about the charges against him and why his movements remain restricted, Durov replied: "To be honest, I'm still looking for answers. I'm puzzled." He continued: "At first, they said, 'Oh, you haven't responded to our legal requests, and that's why you're complicit.'" But first, it is false to say that we did not respond to legally binding legal requests, and second, this is a very broad interpretation of complicity, even for the French legal and judicial system."

== See also ==
- Internet censorship in France
