= Axel Neff =

American businessman

- Born: David "Axel" Neff; Buffalo, New York, U.S.
- Citizenship: United States
- Education: Swarthmore College
- Occupation: Entrepreneur
- Years active: October 2008–Present
- Known for: Co-Founding Digital Fortress LLC in 2012; Co-Founding Telegram LLC in 2013

David "Axel" Neff is an American businessman, best known for his role as the former Director of International Operations of the Russian social network Vkontakte and as a co-founder of mobile messaging platform Digital Fortress, used to create the instant messaging application Telegram Messenger. Neff was a co-founder of the US based Telegram LLC, which was responsible for the creation of Telegram Messenger. He served as the head of subsidiaries for both companies, Durov LLC and Digital Fortress LLC respectively. Neff was also the director of Pictograph LLC and Telegram LLC.

== Early life ==
Neff is from Buffalo, New York and graduated high school from Springville Griffith Institute. From there he moved to Philadelphia, PA to attend Swarthmore College, where he studied engineering and played football. He graduated in 2003 with a Bachelor of Science in Engineering and Economics.

== Career ==
=== Involvement in VK ===
While in College, Neff became acquainted with Ilya Perekopsky and Pavel Durov through a mutual friend at Saint Petersburg State University.

From July 2008 to April 2014, he served as the Assistant Director of International Operations. He assisted with various global expansion efforts, VK operational matters in the US, and translation of the social network from Russian into other languages. He played a key role in acquiring the domain name VK.com which VK transitioned to in 2012. He was also involved in VK expansion by sending contest winners iPod Nano promotion from Colden, NY.

=== Digital Fortress LLC ===
Digital Fortress LLC was a company created by Neff in his home city of Buffalo, New York in 2012, and co-founded by Pavel Durov. It is engaged in the management and financing of mobile applications. Neff served as the director of this company. Digital Fortress LLC maintained its headquarters in Buffalo, New York. In early 2013 the company bought 96 terabytes of infrastructure from QBC Systems. In April of that same year, Pavel Durov said that Digital Fortress was a cloud cluster, that was created for the benefit of startups from the Start Fellows.

On August 14, 2013, the company released its first experimental application, called Telegram. Telegram is a freemium instant messaging application for smartphones that was built using a new encryption algorithm called MTProto, which was created by Pavel Durov's Brother, Nikolai Durov.

=== Telegram affiliation ===
In January 2013, the news channel TV Rain reported that Neff's Digital Fortress company was working on a new project. At that time, it was reported the first application to be supported by Digital Fortress would be called telegra.ph, for which a domain had already been registered. Later this name was dropped in favor of Telegram.

On August 14, 2013, the application was released on the Apple iOS platform. At the same time, a contest was announced to solicit developers to assist in developing the application on Android, referred to as "Durov's Android Challenge".

Shortly following the release of Telegram, Durov publicly spoke with Izvestia stating that "Telegram, strictly speaking is not my project". In this interview he explained that the project he partially supported by investments was Digital Fortress, a cloud hosting platform for projects like Telegram among others.

Three weeks after the launch of Telegram, it began to see nearly immediate success. Every day more than 100 000 new registered users began to appear on the network. Most of whom were from Arab countries. A few months later in 2014, following the sale of WhatsApp to Facebook, Telegram saw a major growth spike when nearly 5 million new users registered in a single day.
