= Valery Durov =

Russian philologist and teacher (born 1945)

- Валерий Дуров
- Born: Valery Semenovich Durov; 13 July 1945 (age 81); Leningrad, Soviet Union
- Education: Philological Faculty of St. Petersburg State University
- Children: Pavel Durov; Nikolai Durov
- Scientific career
- Fields: Latin literature, History of ancient Rome
- Workplaces: Philological Faculty of St. Petersburg State University

Valery Semenovich Durov (Note: In this name that follows East Slavic naming customs, the patronymic is Semenovich and the family name is Durov.) (Russian: Валерий Семёнович Дуров; 13 July 1945) is a Russian antiquarian, philologist and academician (Honored Worker of Higher Professional Education of the Russian Federation). From 1992 until 2013, he was head of the Department of Classical Philology at St. Petersburg State University.

== Career ==
Durov graduated from the Philological Faculty of Leningrad University in 1968, was in graduate school at the Department of Classical Philology and in 1974 he defended his thesis "The Tenth Satire of Juvenal".

His research interests include history and literature of ancient Rome, and he lectures and conducts seminars on the history of Roman literature and the various aspects of the Latin language (syntax of a simple sentence, case syntax, style, etc.).

== Family ==
He is the father of Pavel Durov, the creator of the VK social network and the Telegram messaging service, as well as Nikolai Durov, a mathematician.

== Key publications ==
- Durov V. S. (1987). Жанр сатиры в римской литературе. Л.: Издательство Ленинградского университета. p. 160.
- Durov V. S. (1991). Юлий Цезарь: человек и писатель (50 000 экз ed.). Л.: Издательство Ленинградского университета. p. 208.
- Durov V. S. (1993). Художественная историография Древнего Рима (4310 экз ed.). СПб.: Издательство Санкт-Петербургского ун-та. p. 144. ISBN 5-288-01199-0.
- Durov V. S. (1994). Нерон, или Актёр на троне. Античная библиотека (3000 экз ed.). СПб.: Алетейя. p. 318.
- Римская поэзия эпохи Августа: уч. пособие. СПб., 1997. 228 с.
- Durov V. S. (2000). История римской литературы. Филология и культура (2000 экз ed.). СПб.: Филологический фак. Санкт-Петербургского гос. ун-та. p. 623. ISBN 5-8465-0013-7.
- Durov V. S. (2003). Латинская христианская литература III—V веков. Biblia sancta. СПб.: Филологический фак. Санкт-Петербургского ун-та. p. 200. ISBN 5-8465-0098-6.
- The basics of Latin style (Russian: Основы стилистики латинского языка). М.; СПб., 2004. 104 с.
- Antique literature: a tutorial. (Russian: Античная литература: учебное пособие.) М.; СПб., 2004. 473 с; 2-е изд.: М.; СПб., 2005. (в соавт. с Г. Г. Анпетковой-Шаровой)
