= Pavel Durov =

Technology entrepreneur (born 1984)

- Павел Дуров
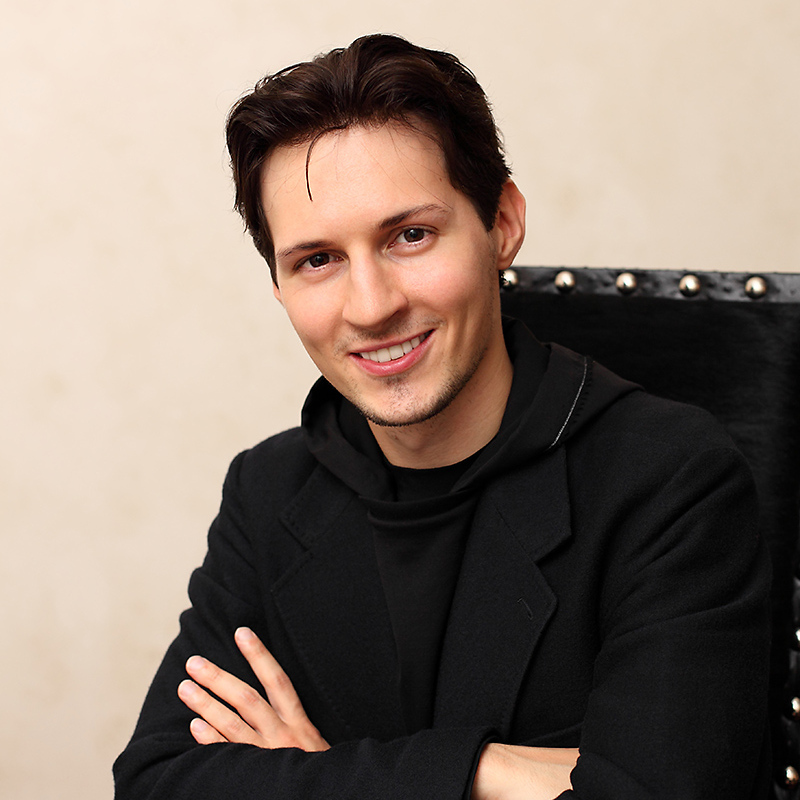
- Pavel Durov in 2012
- Born: 10 October 1984 (age 42); Leningrad, Soviet Union
- Other name: Paul du Rove (Note: Used in France only)
- Citizenship: Soviet Union (until 1991); Russia (since 1991); Saint Kitts and Nevis (since 2013); United Arab Emirates (since 2021); France (since 2021)
- Education: Saint Petersburg State University (BA)
- Known for: Co-founding of VK and Telegram
- Title: CEO of VK (2006–2014); CEO of Telegram (2013–present)
- Children: 100+
- Father: Valery Durov
- Relatives: Nikolai Durov (brother)

Pavel Valeryevich Durov (Note: In this name that follows East Slavic naming customs, the patronymic is Valeryevich and the family name is Durov.) (Russian: Павел Валерьевич Дуров; born 10 October 1984) is a Russian technology entrepreneur who is best known as the chief executive officer (CEO) of Telegram.

Durov was born in the Soviet Union, and he co-founded the social networking site VKontakte (VK) in 2006. He was forced out of VK in 2014 following disputes with the company's new owners and increased pressure from Russian authorities, which also led him to leave the country. In 2013, he and his older brother, Nikolai Durov, developed Telegram, and in 2017, they moved to Dubai, United Arab Emirates, where its headquarters are now located.

Durov was listed on Forbes's billionaires list in 2023, with an estimated net worth of $13 billion. His fortune is largely driven by his ownership of Telegram. As of 13 March 2026, Durov was ranked the 588th richest person in the world, with an estimated net worth of $6.6 billion, according to Forbes. In 2022, he was recognized by Forbes as the richest expat in the United Arab Emirates. In February 2023 Arabian Business named him the most powerful entrepreneur in Dubai. Since 2021, he has held citizenship in Russia, Saint Kitts and Nevis, the United Arab Emirates, and France.

Durov publicly stands for Internet freedom and criticizes the establishment that tries to restrict it. On 24 August 2024, Durov was arrested by French police on criminal charges relating to an alleged lack of content moderation on Telegram and refusal to work with police, which allegedly allowed the spread of criminal activities. In July 2026, Russia issued an arrest warrant against Durov for “collaborating with terrorist activities”.

== Early life and education ==
Durov was born on 10 October 1984 in Leningrad, then Soviet Union, into a Russian family. His father is Valery Durov, a professor of philology. Pavel Durov and his older brother Nikolai spent most of their childhood in Turin, Italy, where their father was employed.

Between 2002 and 2006, Durov studied English and Translation at Saint Petersburg State University, where his father worked.

Pavel Durov's grandfather Semyon Petrovich Tulyakov fought in World War II. He served in the 65th Infantry Division of the Soviet Red Army, participated in battles on the Leningrad Front at Krasnoborsky and Gatchinsky, and was wounded three times, receiving the Order of the Red Star, the Order of the Patriotic War 2nd degree, and on the 40th Victory Day, the Order of the Great Patriotic War 1st degree.

Durov's father Valery Semenovich Durov is a Doctor of Philological Sciences and the author of academic papers. Since 1992, he has been head of the Department of classical philology of the philological faculty of Saint Petersburg State University. In March 2022 Durov wrote that, "On my Mom's side, I trace my family line from Kyiv. Her maiden name is Ukrainian (Ivanenko), and to this day we have many relatives living in Ukraine."

== Career ==
=== VK ===
During his university years, Durov created the highly popular forum spbgu.ru. In 2006, he met his former classmate Vyacheslav Mirilashvili in Saint Petersburg. Vyacheslav showed Durov the increasingly popular Facebook, after which the friends decided to create a new Russian social network. Lev Binzumovich Leviev, an Israeli classmate of Vyacheslav Mirilashivili, became the third co-founder. Durov became chief executive officer (CEO) and attracted his older brother Nikolai, a multiple winner of international math and programming competitions including the International Mathematical Olympiad, to develop the site.

Durov launched VKontakte for beta testing in September 2006. The following month, the domain name Vkontakte.ru was registered. The new project was incorporated on 19 January 2007 as a Russian private limited company. The user base reached 1 million in July 2007, and 10 million in April 2008. In December 2008 VK overtook rival Odnoklassniki as Russia's most popular social networking service. The company grew to a value of US$3 billion.

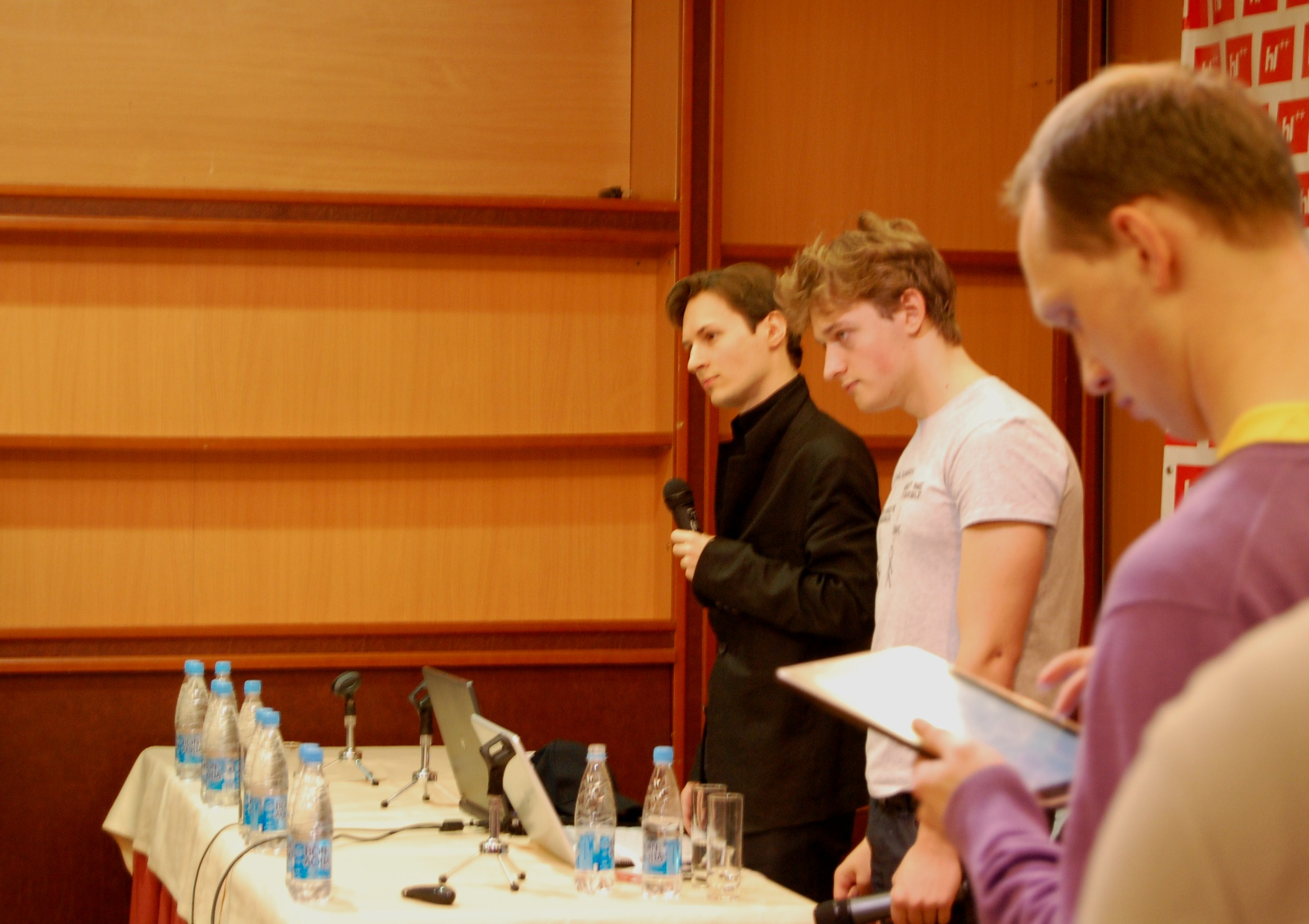
Pavel Durov at the HighLoad++ conference in Moscow, 2010

In 2011, he was involved in a standoff with the police in Saint Petersburg when the government demanded the removal of opposition politicians' pages after the 2011 election to the Duma; Durov posted a picture of a dog with its tongue out wearing a hoodie, and the police left after an hour when he did not answer the door.

In 2012, Durov publicly posted a picture of himself extending his middle finger and calling it his official response to Mail.ru Group's efforts to buy VK. In December 2013, Durov decided to sell his 12% to Ivan Tavrin (at that time 40% of the shares belonged to Mail.ru Group, and 48% to the United Capital Partners). Later, Tavrin resold these shares to Mail.ru Group.

==== Departure from VK ====
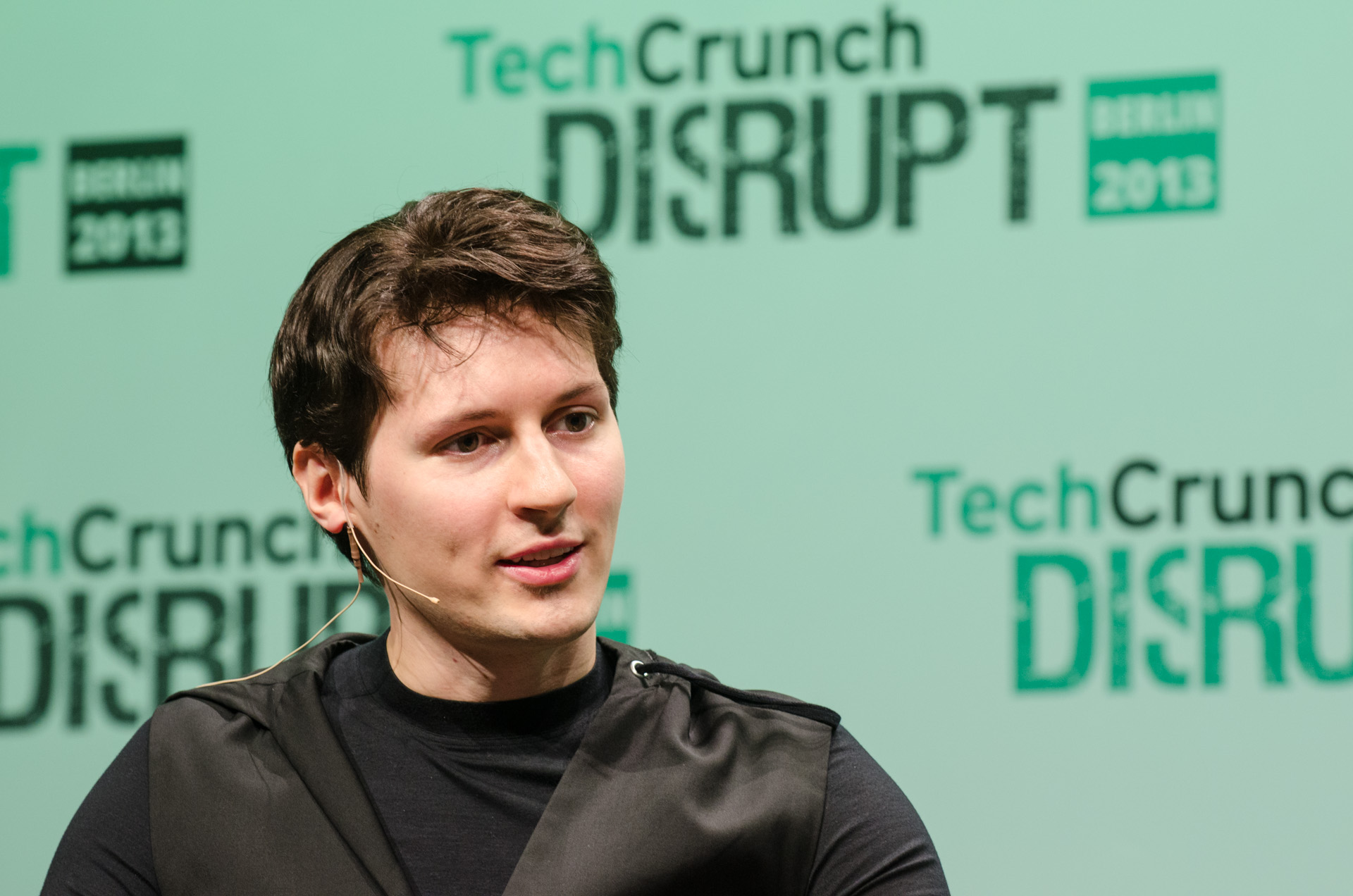
Pavel Durov at the TechCrunch conference in Berlin, 2013

On 1 April 2014, Durov submitted his resignation to the VK board; at first there was confusion about the veracity of his resignation. However, Durov himself said it was an April Fool's Joke on 3 April 2014. His resignation message had signed off with "So Long and Thanks for All the Fish", a line from cult novel Hitchhikers Guide to the Galaxy and the title of a later book in the series. A company spokesman said there was an official statement about his resignation that turned out to be a link to the Rick rolling internet meme.

On 16 April 2014, Durov publicly refused to hand over the personal data of Ukrainian protesters against pro-Russian president Viktor Yanukovych to Russia's Federal Security Service and to block Alexei Navalny's page on VK. Instead, he posted the relevant orders on his own VK page, saying that the requests were unlawful.

On 21 April 2014, Durov was dismissed as CEO of VK. The company said it was acting on his letter of resignation a month earlier that he failed to recall. Durov then said the company had been effectively taken over by Vladimir Putin's allies, suggesting his ousting was the result of both his refusal to hand over personal details of users to federal law enforcement and his refusal to hand over the personal details of people who were members of a VK group dedicated to the Euromaidan protest movement. Durov then left Russia and stated that he had "no plans to go back" and that "the country is incompatible with internet business at the moment". However, according to Russian investigative news outlet iStories, Durov returned to Russia more than 50 times between 2015 and 2021. Irina Bolgar, who lived with Durov during that period, told The New York Times that after several months outside Russia, Durov returned to the country with her despite his public disavowals, and the two resumed life together in St. Petersburg. A spokesman for Durov said that he had lived primarily outside Russia after 2013 but had never concealed returns to the country.

=== Telegram ===
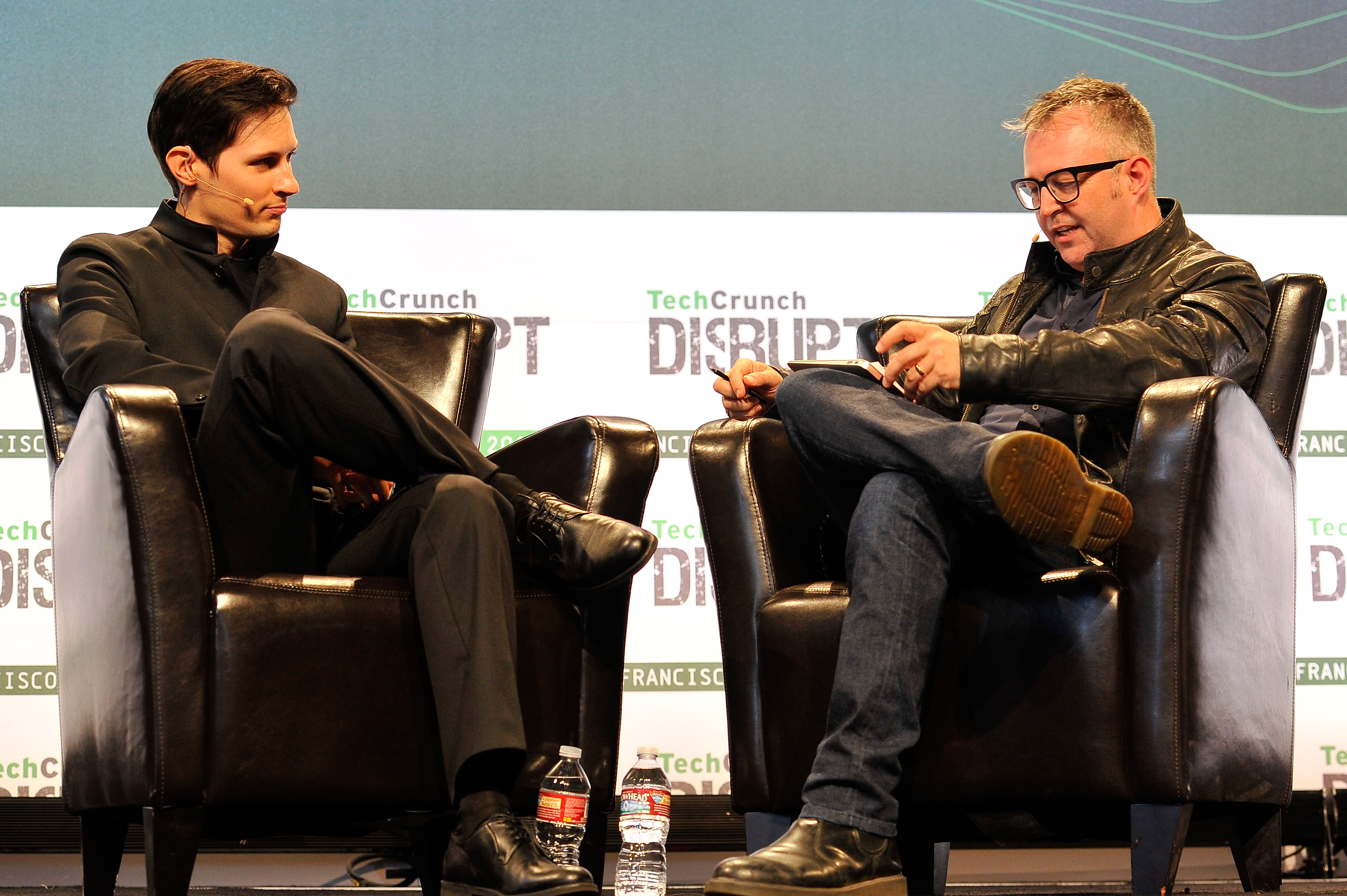
Pavel Durov and Mike Butcher at the TechCrunch conference in San Francisco, 2015

On leaving Russia, he obtained Saint Kitts and Nevis citizenship by donating $250,000 to the country's Sugar Industry Diversification Foundation and secured $300 million in cash within Swiss banks. This allowed him to focus on creating his next company, Telegram, an encrypted messaging service. Telegram was briefly headquartered in Berlin and later moved to Dubai.

In January 2018, Durov announced that, in a bid to monetize the growing success of Telegram, he was launching the "Gram" cryptocurrency and the Telegram Open Network (TON) platform. It raised a total of $1.7 billion from investors. However, these ventures were halted by American regulator U.S. Securities and Exchange Commission which argued in court that Gram tokens bypassed U.S. financing laws and should return the money to investors.

In 2018, Russia attempted to block Telegram after the company refused to cooperate with Russian security services. A leaked letter by a Federal Security Service employee stated that the block was actually tied to the company's intention to launch the Telegram Open Network. During the attempted block period, the Russian Ministry of Foreign Affairs continued to operate official channels on the app. The block order was lifted in 2020, after two years of block attempts, which the service reportedly evaded using domain fronting. The stated reason was Telegram agreeing to "counter terrorism and extremism" on the platform.

Durov said that Telegram became profitable for the first time in 2024, with total revenue over $1 billion.

In 2024, when announcing Telegram had over 1 billion active users, he criticised Meta-owned WhatsApp as "a cheap, watered-down imitation of Telegram" and accused the competitor of using lobbying and PR campaigns to slow down Telegram.

In September 2024, Irina Bolgar, who claims to be the mother of three of Durov's children (see below), publicly stated on Instagram that Telegram should be considered jointly acquired property, as the messenger was conceived and developed during their ten-year relationship and they discussed its development together in daily life. Although Bolgar and Durov were never officially married, she noted that some jurisdictions recognize de facto relationships as official marriages for the purposes of property disputes.

== 2024 arrest and indictment ==
Durov was arrested on 24 August 2024 at Paris–Le Bourget Airport by officers from France's anti-fraud office, which is attached to the French customs authority. He was arrested upon exiting his private jet after landing in France from Azerbaijan. Durov's arrest was based on an arrest warrant issued by the French judicial police as part of a preliminary investigation in relation to 12 suspected violations regarding crime on the Telegram platform. On 28 August, Durov was presented before a prosecutor in court, who formalized 6 charges related to refusal to communicate upon request from authorized authorities, complicity in criminal activity and provision of cryptology services. On the same day Durov was released from custody and placed under the judicial supervision, on the conditions that he post 6 million euro bail, be banned from leaving France, and report to the police station twice a week.

One of the charges against Durov carries a maximum penalty of 10 years imprisonment and a fine of €500,000. Following the issuance of formal charges, Durov was released on bail and was barred from leaving the territory of France until the case was resolved. It is said that Durov had previously avoided traveling to Europe due to potential legal risks. According to Le Canard enchaîné, Durov claimed during his arrest that he had traveled to Paris to dine with French President Emmanuel Macron, which Macron's office denied.

Reports also indicate that Durov was on the list of individuals wanted by French authorities, and his arrest was because of his alleged failure to cooperate with judicial officials, including issues related to Telegram's activities. According to French police, criminal activity on Telegram went unfettered through lack of moderators. Natalia Krapiva, a lawyer at the digital rights group Access Now, said that French authorities could try to force Durov to provide Telegram's encryption keys to decrypt private messages, "which Russia has already tried to do in the past".

During Durov's arrest and indictment, The Wall Street Journal reported that he became a target of a spy operation in 2017. In a joint operation code-named "Purple Music", French spies and the UAE hacked Durov's iPhone. He was targeted because those governments were concerned about the usage of the Telegram app by pro-democracy activists and dissidents. The app also attracted Islamist extremists, drug traffickers and cybercriminals. Despite the hack, Durov received Emirati citizenship in 2021, when the UAE also invested over $75 million into Telegram.

In March 2025, Durov was allowed to leave France and returned to Dubai for a short period.

== Personal life ==
Durov has never been married and has often spoken about his preferences and perceived benefits on living alone. However, according to The New York Times, Irina Bolgar provided evidence—including photographs, receipts and a notarized document promising up to 150,000 euros per month in financial support—showing that she and Durov lived together as a couple in Saint Petersburg from 2013 to at least 2017. A former employee of Durov, who spoke to the Times on condition of anonymity, corroborated the account, describing the two as a loving couple who lived in an apartment in central St. Petersburg. He moved to the United Arab Emirates in 2017 and lives in Dubai, where Telegram headquarters are located. He was naturalized as an Emirati citizen in February 2021.

Durov was naturalized as a French citizen in August 2021, giving him European Union citizenship. Le Monde described the naturalisation as "mysterious", since Durov had not resided in France apart from brief visits. Le Monde suggested that Durov was naturalised through the rarely used "merit foreigner" procedure that is awarded directly by the French government to people viewed to have contributed exceptionally to France's international influence or international economic relations. Durov officially changed the French version of his name to Paul du Rove. One year later, he told his fans that the passport application had been an April Fools' joke and that he had forgotten about it, only discovering later that "the application actually got approved and the passport reissued".

=== Children ===
It is reported that Durov has two children with Daria Bondarenko, a former classmate. It is speculated that one of these children is included in a 2013 photo posted by Durov in late 2024. According to Forbes, Durov met Bondarenko while studying at university; as of 2021, she was living in Barcelona. In 2021, Russian Forbes ranked Durov's children as the sixth-richest heirs in Russia.

On 23 July 2024—the day after Durov publicly claimed to have fathered more than 100 children via sperm donation—Irina Bolgar, who lives in Switzerland, contacted Forbes and shared documentation showing that she is the mother of three children by Durov; she also provided a family photo with Durov taken in 2020. Forbes confirmed the authenticity of the documents; Forbes Russia separately verified paternity documents through the Geneva-based translator Bolgar had used when she moved to Switzerland.

According to Forbes, Bolgar met Durov in Russia in 2012; they moved to Saint Petersburg, where their three children were born between 2013 and 2017. Because children born outside of marriage were not legally recognized in the UAE at the time, Bolgar and the children remained in Russia when Durov moved to Dubai in 2017. Irina Bolgar and the children continued to spend family time with Pavel Durov after his move to Dubai, meeting in Switzerland, Dubai and other countries; according to Bolgar, the relationship continued until the end of 2022.

In March 2023, Bolgar filed a criminal complaint with the Geneva Public Prosecutor's Office alleging that Durov was physically violent toward their youngest son (born September 2017) five times between 2021 and 2022, resulting in injuries that allegedly included a concussion and sleep disorders. Transcripts of messages purportedly exchanged by Bolgar and Durov in Paris in November 2021 and a medical certificate from April 2023 were entered as evidence. The prosecutor initially refused to accept the complaint because it had been filed more than three months after the most recent alleged incident; after Bolgar appealed in May 2023, the court allowed the case to proceed in October 2023. As of August 2024, the case remained ongoing.

In April 2023, Bolgar filed a separate civil case in Geneva seeking sole custody. The court granted her exclusive custody and suspended Durov's parental rights in May 2023, a decision reaffirmed in February 2024. Durov did not contest the ruling and appears not to have hired an attorney or responded to the court. Bolgar also filed a civil child support case against Durov in June 2024; she stated that since Durov stopped providing financial support at the beginning of 2023, she had been supporting their children on her monthly salary of 8,000 Swiss francs.

According to Forbes, French authorities separately opened an investigation into an alleged act of violence by Durov against the same child in Paris in November 2021. Maylis de Roeck, deputy prosecutor at the Paris prosecutor's office, confirmed the investigation was conducted by OFMIN (the Juvenile Office) and was separate from the Telegram-related case that led to Durov's August 2024 arrest. De Roeck said the office was checking whether there was already a "legal framework" in Switzerland to avoid two investigations into the same incident in different countries.

In 2024, Durov claimed to have fathered more than 100 children via sperm donation in 12 countries since 2010. In 2025, he announced that he wanted to leave his fortune, estimated at US$17 billion as of 2025, to his 106 children after his death. None of them would be able to receive an inheritance before reaching the age of 30, which all his current children will have reached by June 19, 2055. Durov has spoken publicly about global fertility rates and sperm donation, including during his appearance on the Lex Fridman Podcast. In December 2025, Durov posted in his Telegram channel about creating a sperm donation program.

=== Views ===
Durov's meme reaction to his inclusion on Rosfinmonitoring's terrorist registry, posted on his Telegram in 2026, contrasting his label as a "terrorist" with Russian foreign minister Sergey Lavrov shaking hands with Taliban leaders as "respected partners".

Durov is a libertarian. He has practiced intermittent fasting and abstains from meat, alcohol, caffeine and recreational drugs. Durov has stated that he maintains an ascetic lifestyle that promotes freedom from personal possessions. At least once, in June 2019, he followed a water-only fasting regimen for at least six days to try to improve his creativity.

In 2012, at the age of 27, Durov published manifestos detailing his ideas on improving Russia and donated $1 million to the Wikimedia Foundation to support Wikipedia.

During the 2011–2013 Russian protests, he refused to censor VK accounts used by anti-Putin activists. Durov said that in 2014, he refused to comply with the FSB request to hand over the personal data of Ukrainian protesters and opposition leaders during Euromaidan, "because it would have meant a betrayal of our Ukrainian users. After that, I was fired from the company I founded and was forced to leave Russia. I lost my company and my home, but would do it again – without hesitation." Durov also refused to relinquish data regarding Alexei Navalny's VK page.

In 2024, Durov said that Telegram should remain a "neutral platform" and not "a player in geopolitics".

== Accolades ==
Durov has been described as the Mark Zuckerberg of Russia for founding the social networking site VK, which is similar to Facebook. In August 2014, Durov was named by the Nordic Business Forum as the most promising leader under 30 in Northern Europe. In 2017, he was chosen by the WEF Young Global Leaders to join their organization, representing Finland.

On 21 June 2018, the Union of Kazakhstan's Journalists bestowed an award on Durov "for his principled position against censorship and the state's interference into citizens' free online correspondence". In 2018, Fortune magazine included Durov in their "40 Under 40" list, an annual ranking of the most influential young people in business.

In February 2023, Durov was named the most powerful entrepreneur in Dubai by Arabian Business.

== See also ==
- List of Russian billionaires
