= German Driving School Telegram rape network =

Telegram-based transnational sexual assault network

A series of criminal investigations and prosecutions involve a Telegram-based network of predominantly Chinese nationals accused of committing drug-facilitated sexual assaults against ethnic Chinese women in Germany between 2020 and 2024. Operating under the name "German Driving School for Experts" (German: Fahrschule für Experten in Deutschland), the group allegedly used encrypted Telegram channels to exchange information on incapacitating drugs, discuss methods of targeting victims and distribute recordings of the assaults. According to investigators, the network consisted of approximately eight core members and several affiliated groups.

The investigation, launched by German authorities in 2024, led to the arrest of multiple suspects in Germany and in the United States through international law enforcement cooperation. Beginning in 2025, several defendants were prosecuted and convicted in German courts on charges including rape, attempted murder, and offences relating to the possession and distribution of illegal recordings. The case attracted widespread attention because of its transnational nature, the use of encrypted messaging platforms to facilitate the offences, and the scale of the investigation.

== Group ==
The criminal network was organized in a hierarchical structure. At its core was a private Telegram group named German Driving School for Experts, comprising eight principal male members active in Germany and the Netherlands, seven of whom were Chinese citizens. The name came from Chinese online slang 老司机 (lit. 'old driver'), which means someone in possession of plenty of porn resources, in turn a reference to a Yunnan folk song named "老司机带带我". According to investigators, the group was used to exchange information on drug procurement and methods of committing drug-facilitated sexual assaults. The network also operated several affiliated Telegram groups, one of which reportedly had approximately 4,500 members. Within the network, members assumed specialized roles. Prosecutors alleged that Zhiting S., who had a medical background and was later arrested in Berlin, served as a "technical consultant", advising other members on drug dosages and the combination of prescription anesthetics. Investigators stated that the drugs were primarily obtained through illegal channels on platforms such as WeChat and distributed among members by mail, with some shipments disguised as cosmetics or skincare products to evade customs inspections.

In order to evade detection, the network used specific vehicle terminology as slang to describe their crimes and victims. Specific code words used within the group to refer to victims and criminal acts include:

Code word / term	Chinese (Pinyin)	Literal meaning	Coded definition in context
Driver	老司机 (Lǎo sījī)	Old Driver	Network participants or perpetrators
Car	车 (Chē)	Vehicle	Female victims or targets
Private car	私家车 (Sījiāchē)	Personal vehicle	Victims who were acquaintances, friends, or romantic partners
Wild car	野车 (Yěchē)	Unregistered / External taxi	Victims who had no prior personal relationship with the perpetrator
Luxury car	豪车 (Háochē)	High-end / Luxury vehicle	Victims considered physically attractive by group members
Driving	开车 (Kāichē)	Operating a vehicle	Executing a drug-facilitated sexual assault
Fuel	汽油 / 燃料 (Qìyóu; Ránliào)	Gasoline / Fuel	Prescription or illegal anesthetics and sedatives
Refueling	加油 (Jiāyóu)	Gas up / Refuse	Administering drugs or spiking food and drinks
Dead pig	死猪 (Sǐzhū)	Deceased pig	Victims rendered completely unconscious by drugs
Half-dead pig	半死猪 (Bànsǐzhū)	Partially dead pig	Victims rendered semi-conscious or incapacitated

== Investigation ==
The investigation was conducted jointly by police and prosecutorial authorities in Hesse, Bavaria, Berlin and other German states. The Hessian Public Prosecutor's Office and the Hessian State Criminal Police Office established a dedicated task force of approximately 40 personnel to coordinate the investigation. A major breakthrough occurred in the second half of 2024 after Frankfurt police received reports from multiple women who alleged that they had been drugged, rendered unconscious and sexually assaulted while showing apartments to prospective tenants. Comparative analysis of toxicological evidence and DNA recovered from the crime scenes linked the cases through a common modus operandi and identified Dapeng Z. as the principal suspect. In September 2024, the Hesse State Police issued public safety warnings in German, English and Chinese advising young Chinese women in Germany to be vigilant against a suspected serial offender targeting the Chinese community.

The investigation subsequently expanded through cooperation between German and Chinese law enforcement authorities. At the request of German investigators, Chinese police provided technical assistance by analyzing social network data to identify links between suspects across Telegram and WeChat. Digital forensic examinations of Dapeng Z.'s electronic devices uncovered the Telegram group, together with extensive communication records and recordings of the offences, enabling investigators to identify additional suspects and trace the procurement and distribution of anesthetic drugs. The findings led to coordinated arrests in Munich, Berlin, Hamburg and other locations. In January 2025, Germany's Federal Criminal Police Office provided investigative leads to the Robbery-Homicide Division of the Los Angeles Police Department, which opened a related investigation into a former Germany-based member suspected of drug-facilitated sexual assault. In June 2026, the Dutch Police arrested four men suspected of drugging and sexually abusing women based on tips received from German and British authorities.

Investigators also concluded from the recovered communications and video evidence that the number of victims was likely substantially higher than the confirmed cases. According to reports, the benzodiazepines administered by the suspects could cause anterograde amnesia, preventing some victims from recalling the assaults and leading them to attribute their symptoms to illness or fatigue.

== Victims ==
The investigation identified a large number of victims across multiple cases, although the total number remains unknown because many offences are believed to have gone unreported. Dapeng Z. was convicted in relation to 22 offences, while Tong Z. was charged with 13 offences involving nine women. Prosecutors also recovered multiple folders from Tong Z.'s computer that documented material relating to as many as 18 victims.

According to investigations by the German Federal Criminal Police Office and regional prosecutorial authorities, confirmed victims were identified in Frankfurt, Munich, Berlin, Mannheim, Göttingen, Nuremberg and parts of the Netherlands. Most victims were Chinese women residing in Germany, including international students, property owners seeking tenants and women who had existing personal relationships with the defendants, such as neighbours, friends or romantic partners.

== Perpetrators (Group members) ==
=== Dapeng Z. ===
Dapeng Z. (aged 43–44 at the time of the offences) lived in Groß-Gerau in Hesse and worked as an information technology specialist for British carmaker Lotus in Frankfurt, having resided in Germany for more than 20 years. According to investigators, he became active in Telegram groups dedicated to violent pornography in 2020 and later served as an administrator of several groups, including "German Driver's License Driving School", where members exchanged information on drug procurement and distributed recordings of sexual assaults. According to the prosecution, Dapeng Z. began drugging and sexually assaulting a woman with whom he had an intimate relationship in January 2021 by secretly administering anesthetics in her drinks. In 2022, he committed similar offences against two other women. From January 2024, investigators stated that he contacted Chinese women advertising rental properties on WeChat and RedNote, posing as a female prospective tenant to gain their trust before arranging apartment viewings.

Prosecutors alleged that Dapeng Z. rendered victims unconscious by administering anesthetics in drinks or by using cloths soaked in anesthetic substances before sexually assaulting and recording them. The Frankfurt Regional Court found that the quantities of drugs used in several cases created a substantial risk to the victims' lives, resulting in convictions for attempted murder in addition to rape offences. During searches of his residence, police recovered drugs, recording equipment, and more than 10 million video files, including recordings of sexual assaults and child sexual abuse material. Dapeng Z. was arrested at his workplace on 14 November 2024 following a joint investigation by German and Chinese law enforcement authorities. During the trial, prosecutors submitted a private letter written by Dapeng Z. shortly before sentencing in which he denied the allegations, described the victims as "the side that can say whatever they want", and dismissed the attempted murder charges as "utterly ridiculous".

On 6 February 2026, the Frankfurt Regional Court convicted Dapeng Z. of 22 offences, including particularly severe rape, attempted murder, narcotics offences, and the illegal possession and distribution of violent pornographic material, sentencing him to 14 years' imprisonment. The court further ordered subsequent preventive detention, finding that he posed a high risk of recidivism because of multiple diagnosed sexual disorders.

=== Zhongyi J. ===
Zhongyi J. (aged 28–29 at the time of the offences) was a Chinese international student studying robotics at the Technical University of Munich and residing in a student apartment in Munich. According to court documents, his primary victim was a Chinese woman who lived in the same apartment building or nearby. Sources differ as to whether she was his girlfriend or a neighbour with whom he had a sexual relationship. Prosecutors stated that, beginning in 2023, Zhongyi J. illegally obtained prescription anesthetics, including midazolam, through WeChat and Telegram, storing them at his residence.

The Munich Regional Court found that between 2023 and December 2024, Zhongyi J. administered anesthetics to the victim on at least eight occasions by mixing them into drinks and dairy products before sexually assaulting and recording her while she was unconscious. According to the court, the doses administered were five to ten times higher than standard medical levels. Trial evidence further showed that he continued the assaults despite the victim displaying life-threatening symptoms, including airway obstruction and facial cyanosis, and twice left her unattended while she remained unconscious or semi-conscious. The victim reportedly experienced dizziness, nausea, and memory loss following the assaults, and was discovered still under the effects of anesthesia when police searched the apartment in December 2024.

On 14 April 2026, the Munich Regional Court convicted Zhongyi J. of particularly severe rape, two counts of attempted murder and unlawful recording of intimate images. Presiding Judge Markus Koppenleitner stated that the offences were highly premeditated and demonstrated a serious disregard for the victim's life and bodily autonomy. Zhongyi J. was sentenced to 11 years and three months' imprisonment. The court also ordered a reservation for preventive detention and required him to undergo psychological treatment for sexual disorders during his sentence to assess the necessity of post-release detention.

=== Tong Z. ===
Tong Z. (aged 25 at the time of the offences) was a mechanical engineering student living in Berlin. He had moved to Germany during his youth to attend boarding school and had resided in the country for approximately ten years. According to prosecutors, his earliest known offence occurred in 2019 while he was still in high school. Investigators identified him as an active member of the Telegram network under the username "God by Day, Devil by Night" (German: Gott bei Tag, Teufel bei Nacht). More than 2,000 chat messages exchanged with the principal suspect Dapeng Z. were recovered during the investigation. The messages included claims that he had sexually assaulted as many as 18 women and statements such as "every girl has a folder" and that he had "administered anesthetics to all these girls".

According to the prosecution, Tong Z. primarily contacted victims through dating applications and committed offences including drug-facilitated rape, voyeurism and unlawful surveillance. Investigators found that he had installed hidden cameras in his residence to record women changing clothes and engaging in sexual activity and had also concealed recording devices in a neighbour's bathroom to film occupants using the toilet and shower. The recordings were reportedly organised into folders identified by victims' names or characteristics. Prosecutors further alleged that, in one case, Tong Z. administered anesthetics to the drink of a young woman with a mild physical and intellectual disability before sexually assaulting and recording her while she was unconscious. The victim became aware of the assaults only after investigators presented her with video evidence and subsequently developed severe social anxiety and post-traumatic stress disorder (PTSD).

In August 2025, the Berlin Regional Court convicted Tong Z. after he pleaded guilty to 13 offences involving sexual assault and violations of privacy. During sentencing, the court described his conduct as demonstrating "appalling misogynistic tendencies". He was sentenced to five years and nine months' imprisonment. Tong Z. admitted to all the charges and said he "felt immense shame" in a personal statement. Unlike the proceedings against Dapeng Z. and Zhongyi J., the court did not order preventive detention for him.

=== Zhiting S. ===
Zhiting S. (aged 32 at the time of the offences) was born near Shanghai and worked in a healthcare-related field in Berlin, where he had a professional medical background. According to prosecutors, he served as the principal "technical consultant" within the "German Driving School for Experts" Telegram network, advising members on drug selection, dosage and the combination of prescription anesthetics. After joining the core group in January 2024, he allegedly provided guidance on the preparation of memory-impairing drug mixtures and gave real-time dosage advice during live-streamed sexual assaults carried out by Dapeng Z.

Prosecutors also charged Zhiting S. with multiple sexual offences allegedly committed in China between 2019 and 2021. Under German law permitting the prosecution of certain serious offences committed abroad, these allegations were incorporated into the indictment before the Berlin Regional Court. The charges included sexual assault, dangerous bodily harm, and aiding particularly severe rape.

Zhiting S. was arrested in December 2024 during the nationwide investigation, and an additional arrest warrant was issued by the Berlin Regional Court on 17 September 2025. His trial began in March 2026 and continued for approximately two months. Owing to public interest, several hearings were moved to a larger courtroom. On 8 July 2026, the Berlin Regional Court sentenced him to five years' imprisonment.

=== Xukaiyuan X. ===
One of the alleged core members of the network, he committed suicide in Hamburg on 13 December 2024 following the public exposure of the group, resulting in the termination of criminal proceedings against him.

== Suspect and alleged group member ==
=== Sizhe (Steven) Weng ===
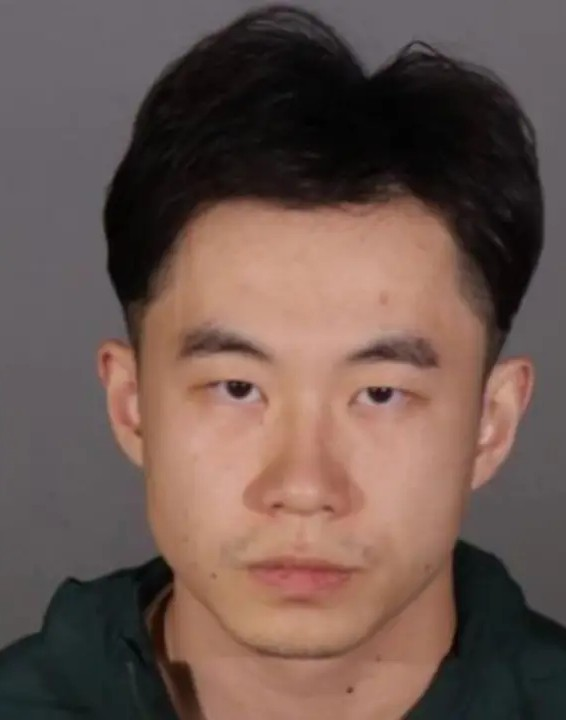
Weng following his arrest by the Los Angeles Police Department (2026)

Sizhe Weng (Note: Also known as Steven Weng; identified in Los Angeles court documents as Weng Sizhe.) (aged 30 at the time of arrest) was a Chinese citizen and a doctoral student at the University of Southern California (USC). Investigators identified him as a member of the network's core Telegram group. According to the Los Angeles County District Attorney's Office, Weng committed multiple drug-facilitated sexual assaults against women in California between 2021 and 2024 while pursuing his doctorate.

The investigation began in January 2025 after Germany's Federal Criminal Police Office provided investigative leads to the Los Angeles Police Department. On 28 August 2025, officers executed a search warrant at Weng's residence, arrested him and recovered evidence that prosecutors alleged linked him to multiple sexual assaults. According to court filings, Weng obtained medical-grade anesthetics including midazolam and sevoflurane from a German supplier and used them alongside benzodiazepines to drug, sexually assault and record three women known to him between December 2021 and 2024. Investigators seized photos, hidden cameras and medical equipment from his residence, leading police to suspect additional victims. Charged with eight felony counts at his arraignment on 2 September, including forcible rape and sodomy by controlled substance, Weng pleaded not guilty and was held without bail, due to flight risk concerns, at the Twin Towers Correctional Facility in Los Angeles. Investigators stated that several victims experienced drug-induced memory loss and became aware of the alleged assaults only after being contacted by law enforcement.

If convicted on all counts, he faces a maximum sentence of 25 years to life imprisonment, plus an additional 56 years in California state prison and mandatory lifetime registration as a sex offender.

== Reactions ==
Following its exposure, the case received widespread attention within the Chinese community in Germany. The Chinese Embassy in Berlin and the Chinese Consulate-General in Frankfurt issued multiple consular advisories urging Chinese citizens in Germany to exercise increased vigilance and stating that they would remain in contact with German authorities regarding the handling of the case. Magdalena Gebhardt, a lawyer representing victims in the Tong Z. case, stated that the Berlin Regional Court's explicit recognition of misogynistic motives in its sentencing was relatively uncommon in German criminal proceedings. She noted that although the Bundestag adopted legislation in 2023 to strengthen penalties for gender-motivated offences, its application in rape cases has remained limited.

In the Zhongyi J. case, Presiding Judge Markus Koppenleitner stated that the proceedings were prolonged by the need to review an unusually large volume of video evidence. He noted that German courts had rarely encountered cases involving evidence of this scale and observed that such recordings were significant in establishing the offences because victims of drug-facilitated sexual assault may be unable to recall the crimes. He also remarked that, like the Pelicot rape case in France, the proceedings demonstrated that drug-facilitated sexual assault was not confined to a single country but occurred internationally. He also stated that crimes had shown "contempt for humanity and for women on a truly monstrous scale".

Although Chinese state media reported heavily on the prosecutions, public discussion on domestic social platforms such as Xiaohongshu encountered widespread censorship. Search queries and screenshots reveal that posts containing explicit keywords faced deletion or account suspensions, whereas users successfully bypassed filters by employing indirect phrases like "date rape" or referencing "German international students".

Telegram did not comment on the specific group involved in the case. In a subsequent statement, a company representative said that the platform prohibits content depicting sexual violence and removes such material upon detection. The company stated that it uses automated moderation systems, including artificial intelligence, to monitor public content and remove material that violates its policies or applicable legal requirements.
