= TON (blockchain) =

Public decentralised layer-1 blockchain platform

The Open Network (TON)
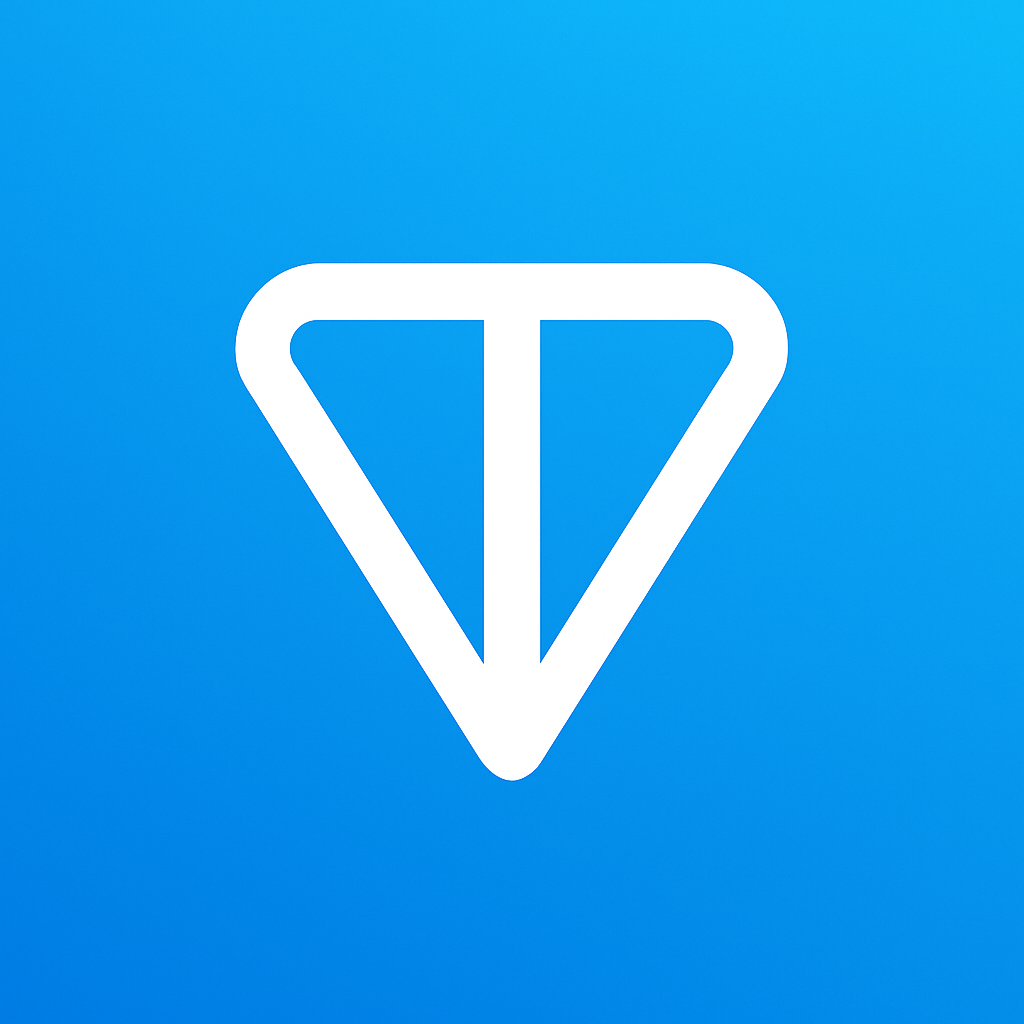
- Developer: Nikolai Durov
- Release: November 2019 (Mainnet)
- Written in: C++, FunC, Tact
- Operating system: Cross-platform
- Type: Blockchain platform
- Website: ton.org
- Repository: github.com/ton-blockchain/ton

The Open Network (TON), or simply TON Blockchain, is a public, decentralised layer-1 blockchain platform that employs the cryptocurrency Gram (ticker: TON) to support transactions and its decentralised-app ecosystem. TON was originally established by Nikolai Durov, who co-founded the Telegram messaging platform, and was originally explored in a technical white paper publication released in 2019. After a legal dispute with the U.S. Securities and Exchange Commission (SEC) caused Telegram to abandon the project in 2020, the application has subsequently been developed and governed by an independent, community-run body called the TON Foundation.

The blockchain is named after its original working title, Telegram Open Network, although the app was renamed The Open Network in response to its freedom from Telegram after a 2020 settlement. In September 2023, Telegram elected TON as its Web3 infrastructure partner, integrating a TON-based wallet to the official Telegram app. TON's native medium is its own cryptocurrency Gram.

== History ==
The Open Network (TON) began in January 2018, when Telegram Messenger Inc. and TON Issuer Inc. started selling "Gram" tokens to finance development of the Telegram Open Network blockchain, ultimately raising US$1.7 billion across two private SAFT rounds.

Peer-to-peer transfers inside Telegram via the @wallet bot became available in April 2022.

In April 2024 Tether (USDT) issued a native TON version.

On June 1, 2026, TON announced plans to rename its native currency from Toncoin to Gram, reviving the name introduced in the network's first white paper.
