= Telegram (software) =

Cross-platform instant messaging service

- Developer: Telegram FZ-LLC
- Release: 14 August 2013; 13 years ago

Stable release(s) [±]
- Android: 12.8.1 / 11 June 2026; 5 months ago
- iOS, iPadOS, watchOS: 12.8 / 9 June 2026; 5 months ago
- Windows, macOS, Linux (Telegram Desktop): 6.9.1 / 9 June 2026; 5 months ago
- macOS: 12.8 / 10 June 2026; 5 months ago
- Wear OS: 2.0.1 / 11 June 2026; 5 months ago
- Written in: Desktop: C++, C, Java, Python; Android: Java iOS: Swift
- Platform: Android, iOS, iPadOS, Windows, macOS, watchOS, Wear OS, Linux, KaiOS, Web platform
- Available in: 66 (officially 12) languages
- List of languages Chinese (Beta), English, Russian, Persian, Turkish, Italian, Arabic, Ukrainian, Kazakh, Uzbek, Portuguese, Spanish, German, Dutch, French, Japanese (Beta), Korean, Indonesian, Malay, Belarusian, Catalan, Polish, Finnish, Hebrew, Oomoo, Amharic
- Type: Social media, instant messaging, VoIP
- License: GNU GPLv2, GNU GPLv3 only with OpenSSL linking exception (clients), proprietary (server)
- Website: telegram.org
- Repository: github.com/telegramdesktop/tdesktop

Telegram Messenger Inc.
- Founded: March 2013; 13 years ago
- Headquarters: Tortola, British Virgin Islands (legal domicile); Dubai, United Arab Emirates (operational center)
- Area served: Worldwide
- Founders: Pavel Durov; Nikolai Durov
- CEO: Pavel Durov
- Industry: Software
- Employees: 30
- Website: telegram.org

Telegram (also known as Telegram Messenger) is a Russian-Emirati cloud-based, cross-platform social media and instant messaging (IM) service. It launched for iOS on 14 August 2013 and Android on 20 October 2013. It allows users to exchange messages, share media and files, and hold private and group voice or video calls as well as public livestreams. It is available for Android, iOS, Windows, macOS, Linux, Wear OS, watchOS and web browsers. Telegram offers end-to-end encryption in voice and video calls, and optionally in private chats if both participants use a mobile device.

Telegram also has social networking features, allowing users to post stories, create public groups with up to 200,000 members, and share one-way updates to unlimited audiences in so-called channels.

Telegram was founded in 2013 by Pavel and Nikolai Durov. Its servers are distributed worldwide with several data centers, and its headquarters are in Dubai, United Arab Emirates. It was the most downloaded app worldwide in January 2021, with a billion downloads globally as of late August 2021. As of 2024, registration to Telegram requires either a phone number and a smartphone or one of a limited number of non-fungible tokens (NFTs) issued in 2022.

As of March 2025, Telegram has more than 1 billion monthly active users, with India as the country with the most users.

== History ==
=== Development ===
Telegram was launched in 2013 by the brothers Nikolai and Pavel Durov. Previously, the pair founded the Russian social network VK, which they left in 2014, saying it had been taken over by the government. Pavel sold his remaining stake in VK and left Russia after resisting government pressure. Nikolai created the MTProto protocol that is the basis for the messenger, while Pavel provided financial support and infrastructure through his Digital Fortress fund. Telegram Messenger denies that its end goal is to profit, but it is not structured as a nonprofit organization.

Telegram is registered as a company in the British Virgin Islands and as an LLC in Dubai. It does not disclose where it rents offices or which legal entities it uses to rent them, citing the need to "shelter the team from unnecessary influence" and protect users from governmental data requests. After Pavel Durov left Russia in 2014, he was said to be moving from country to country with a small group of computer programmers consisting of 15 core members.

While a former employee of VK said that Telegram had employees in Saint Petersburg, Pavel said the Telegram team made Berlin, Germany, its headquarters in 2014, but failed to obtain German residence permits for everyone on the team and moved to other jurisdictions in early 2015. Since 2017, the company has been based in Dubai. Its data centers are spread across a complex corporate structure of shell companies in various jurisdictions to avoid compliance with government subpoenas. The company says this is done "to protect the data that is not covered by end-to-end encryption". Telegram's FAQ page says it does not process requests related to illegal content in chats and group chats, and that "to this day, we have disclosed 0 bytes of user messages to third parties, including governments". But according to Pavel, Telegram disclosed data for 203 legal requests from the Brazilian government in January to September 2024 and 6,992 legal requests from India, its largest market, during that period. Users can use Telegram's transparency bot to check how many legal requests from their country it has processed.

=== Usage ===
In October 2013, Telegram announced that it had 100,000 daily active users.

On 24 March 2014, Telegram announced that it had reached 35 million monthly users and 15 million daily active users. In October 2014, South Korean government surveillance plans drove many of its citizens to switch to Telegram from the Korean app KakaoTalk. In December 2014, Telegram announced that it had 50 million active users, generating 1 billion daily messages, and that it had 1 million new users signing up on its service every week, traffic doubled in five months with 2 billion daily messages. In September 2015, Telegram announced that the app had 60 million active users and delivered 12 billion daily messages.

In February 2016, Telegram announced that it had 100 million monthly active users, with 350,000 new users signing up every day, delivering 15 billion messages daily. In December 2017, Telegram reached 180 million monthly active users. By March 2018, that number had doubled, with Telegram reaching 200 million monthly active users.

On 14 March 2019, Pavel said that "3 million new users signed up for Telegram within the last 24 hours." He did not specify what prompted this flood of new sign-ups, but the period matched a prolonged technical outage experienced by Facebook and its family of apps, including Instagram. According to the US Securities and Exchange Commission, as of October 2019, Telegram had 300 million monthly active users worldwide.

On 24 April 2020, Telegram announced that it had reached 400 million monthly active users.

On 8 January 2021, Pavel announced in a blog post that Telegram had reached "about 500 million" monthly active users. In August, TechCrunch reported that India was Telegram's largest market, with a 22% share of total installs coming from the region. Telegram then gained over 70 million new users as a result of an outage that affected Facebook and its affiliates on 5 October 2021.

On 19 June 2022, Telegram announced that it had reached 700 million monthly active users.

Telegram surpassed 800 million monthly active users in July 2023 and reached 900 million in March 2024 and 950 million in July 2024. In March 2025, Pavel Durov announced that Telegram had surpassed 1 billion monthly active users.

=== 2026 removal from the App Store ===
On 3 August 2026, Telegram became unavailable for download from the iPhone and iPad App Store. The removal lasted several hours, during which people who had already installed Telegram could continue using it. Telegram subsequently announced that the application had returned to the store. An Apple spokesperson said that the company's review had found content violating its strict guidelines against child sexual abuse material (CSAM). Apple said that Telegram was restored on the same day after its developer removed the content and banned the user who had posted it. Apple did not publicly give further details about the original report, the location of the material on Telegram, or why the entire application was removed before Telegram was contacted.

Telegram criticized Apple's decision to remove the entire application because of material posted by one user. Telegram spokesperson Remi Vaughn said Apple had been wrong to disrupt legitimate communication by the service's users over the actions of a single person. Responding to Apple's explanation on X, Telegram questioned whether Apple would apply the same standard equally to all other applications in the App Store. Telegram also linked to its safety overview, which states that the service removes many groups, channels, and pieces of content that violate its terms of service. Telegram said it had blocked more than 337,900 groups and channels associated with CSAM during 2026 by the time of the incident. That figure has not been independently audited. Epic Games chief executive Tim Sweeney questioned how large-scale communication services could operate if a single user's illegal post was sufficient for an entire application to be removed. He also questioned whether Apple would apply the same standard to its own iMessage service.

On 4 August, Telegram founder Pavel Durov alleged that the prohibited material had been deliberately placed in a public group by a person engaged in what he called "takedown extortion". According to Durov, such attackers demand payment from the administrators of online communities and threaten to plant illegal material and report it to application-store operators if payment is refused. Durov said the person responsible for the incident had inserted AI-modified illegal material by editing an older message in an active group. He said this made the material difficult for ordinary group members to notice and report. Durov also criticized Apple, saying it removed Telegram before contacting the company. He argued that the decision created a systemic risk for any application hosting user-generated content, because coordinated attackers could attempt to cause the removal of legitimate applications or online communities by planting prohibited material. Apple did not confirm Durov's account of the incident.

== Features ==
=== Messaging ===
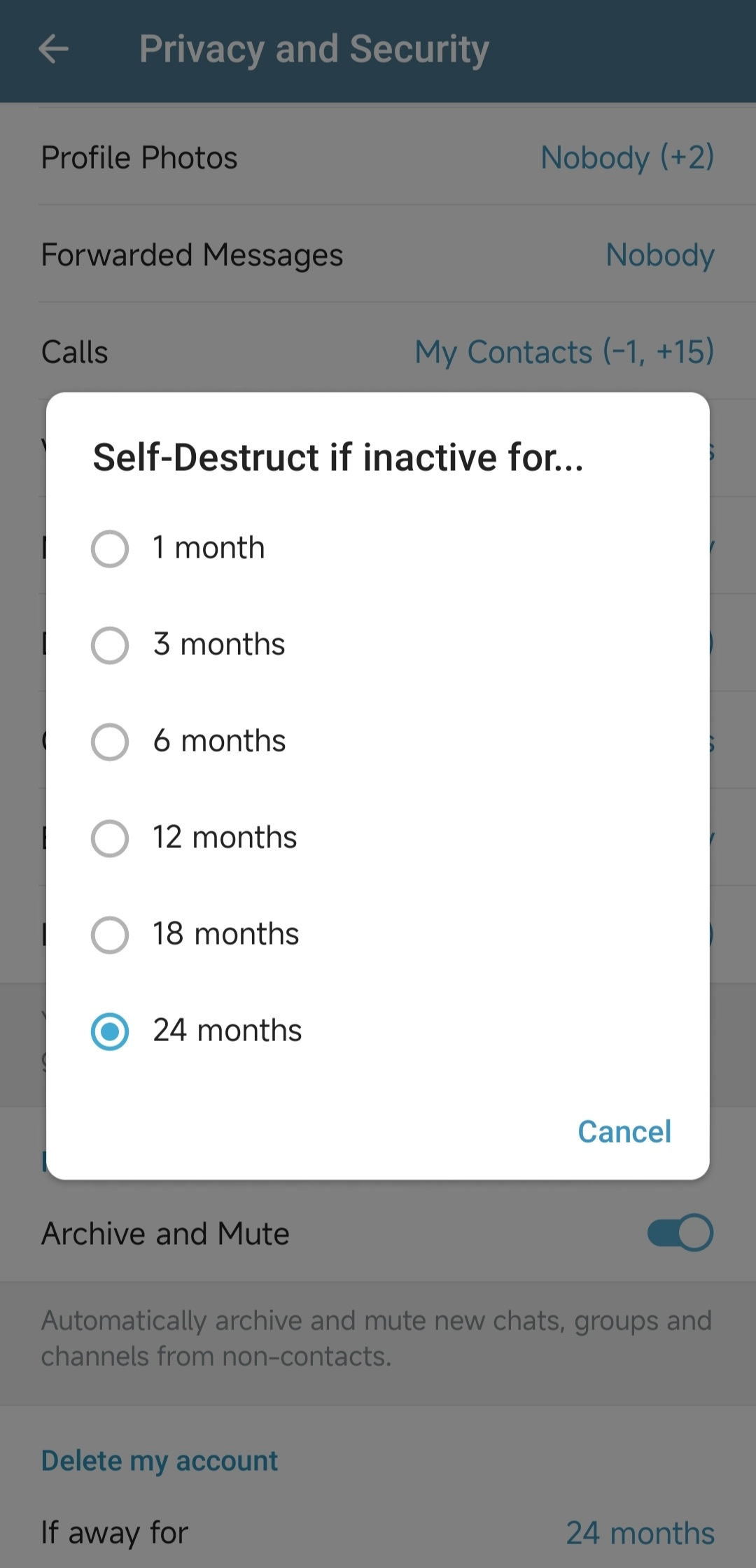
Account self-destruction option.

To use Telegram, a user must sign up with their phone number or an anonymous +888 number purchased from the Fragment blockchain platform. Changing the phone number in the app will automatically reassign the user's account to that number without exporting data or notifying their contacts. Phone numbers are hidden by default, with only a user's contacts able to see them. Sign-ups can be done only on an Android or iOS device.

Messages users send and receive are tied to their numbers and custom usernames, not the device. Telegram content is synced between users' logged-in devices automatically through cloud storage, except for device-specific secret chats. By default, any account that is inactive for 6 months is deleted, but the period can be shortened or extended up to 18 months. Telegram allows groups, bots and channels with a verified social media or Wikipedia page to be verified, but not individual user accounts.

Messages can contain formatted text, media, files up to 2 GB (4 GB with Premium), locations, and audio or video messages recorded in-app. Telegram messages in private chats can be edited for up to 48 hours; an "edited" icon indicates changes. Messages may also be deleted for both sides without a trace. Users may delete messages and whole chats for both themselves and other participants. Chats can be exported to preserve them via Telegram's Desktop client, but the saved data cannot be imported back into the user's account.

Users can import chat history, including both messages and media, from WhatsApp, Line, and KakaoTalk due to data portability, making a new chat to hold the messages or adding them to an existing one.

As users can be logged into many devices at once, starting to type a message on one of them will create a "cloud draft" that syncs with others, so that typing can be started on a phone and finished on a laptop, for example.

Any message can be translated by opening the context menu. Premium users can translate a whole chat with one click. Users can hide the translate button for messages written in specific languages.

Reactions can be used to respond to a message with emoji. Premium users have access to more reaction choices and can leave more reactions per message. Reactions are always on in private chats and can be enabled by admins in groups and channels. Specific reactions can be allowed or excluded. Reaction emoji play an animation with special effects.

Users can also send stickers, which can be static, animated or video. Sticker packs are made by Telegram designers as well as regular users and can be shared via links. They use the WebP or WebM format and do not require special software to create or upload. Some stickers feature full-screen effects that play out when first sent or when tapped.

Users can schedule messages to send at a particular time or when their conversation partner comes online, as well as choose to send a message "without sound" without a notification. Messages from private chats can be forwarded, with an option to hide the original sender's identity or to hide captions from media messages. Forwarded messages also maintain reply formatting, able to show which messages in a thread are replying to others. Any user can also send a message to a special "Saved Messages" chat as a form of bookmarking them. The contents of the chat are only visible to the user.

Chats can be sorted into folders to organize them with preset options like "Unread" and "Muted" or custom separations such as "Work" and "Family". Premium users have the ability to set any chat folder as the default screen in the app while regular users will always see the full chat list when first opening the app.

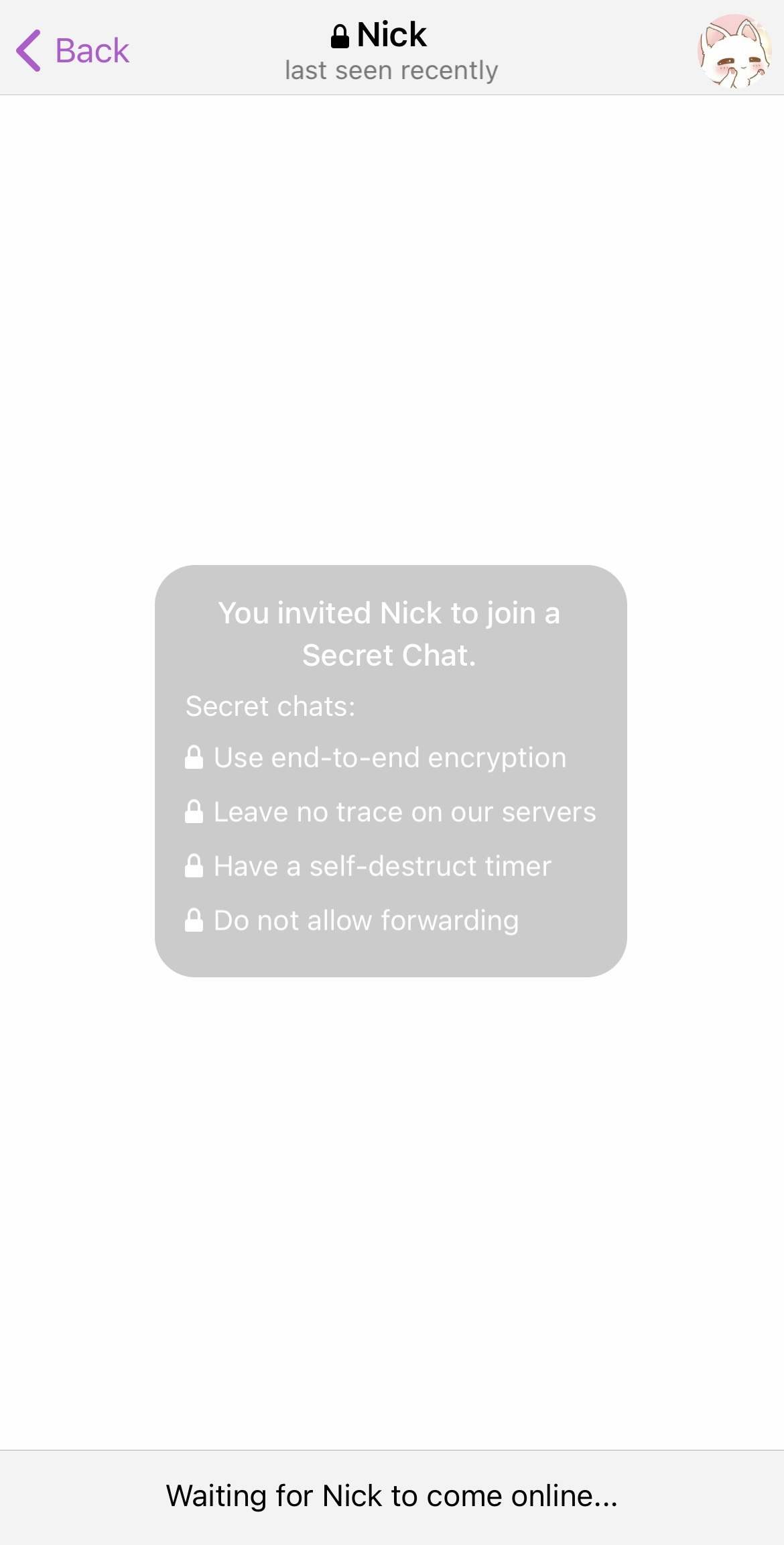
A "secret chat" confirmation notice – screenshot from iOS 16

Users have the option to start a one-on-one, end-to-end-encrypted "Secret Chat", which remains accessible only on the device on which it started and self-destructs upon logging out. Secret Chats restrict screenshotting by Android devices and warn when one is taken on an iOS device, while also hiding the chat contents from the final image. Secret Chats support perfect forward secrecy and switch encryption keys after a key has been used 100 times or a week has passed. Secret Chats are available only on Android, iOS, and macOS clients.

Both in Secret and regular chats, messages can self-destruct after they are read, disappearing for all parties after a period set by the user, ranging from one day to one year.

=== Groups and channels ===
Telegram users can create and join groups and channels. Groups are large multi-user chats that support up to 200,000 members and can be public or private. Users can freely join public chats and find them using the in-app search function, while private chats require an invitation. They support flexible admin rights and can use bots for moderation to prevent spam and unwanted activity. Groups can be split into topics, effectively creating subgroups dedicated to various subjects with separate settings for each.

Admins can choose to hide the list of members in a group, as well as post anonymously themselves. Similarly, groups and channels can have content protection enabled, which prevents screenshots, forwarding and downloading of media. Ownership of channels and groups can be transferred to one of the admins if the owner wishes to give up their rights.

Groups support threaded replies, where bringing up the context menu on a message allows one to open a screen with a thread of replies made to that message and the subsequent ones in the thread. Specific users can be tagged in the group by adding @username to a message, where "username" is that particular user's username.

Groups and channels also support polls, which can be open or anonymous and can support multiple choices. When forwarded, polls retain the answer data and any votes cast in other chats will count toward the overall total.

Channels are one-way feeds where the channel owner or admins can post content while followers can only read, react and comment, if comments have been enabled. Channels can be created for broadcasting messages to an unlimited number of subscribers. The list of those who subscribe to a channel can only be seen by its admins. Posting in the channel is anonymous, though admins can choose to add signatures to their posts. Channels offer detailed statistics on view counts, user growth and interactions, also visible only to admins.

Channel owners are able to use Telegram to create giveaways, randomly awarding channel members with prizes such as Telegram Premium subscriptions to their followers, based on certain criteria. Users with a Telegram Premium subscription have a number of "boosts" that they can give to channels, which allow the channel to "level up" and unlock features, such as the ability to customize messages or post stories as the channel.

In December 2019, Bloomberg News moved their messenger-based newsletter service from WhatsApp to Telegram after the former banned bulk and automated messaging. Other news services with official channels on the platform include the Financial Times, Business Insider and The New York Times.

Channels have also been used by governments and heads of state. Notable examples include Volodymyr Zelenskyy and Emmanuel Macron. Channels have been used by journalists in oppressive regimes to establish independent news networks.

=== Telegram Mini Apps ===
Telegram also provides an open API for the creation of custom bots which can perform various tasks, integrate other services into Telegram chats, or work as mini apps or games. In July 2024, Telegram Mini Apps reached 500 million monthly active users.

=== Video and voice calls ===
Since 2017, Telegram users have been able to initiate one-on-one calls in private chats. Calls are end-to-end encrypted and prioritize peer-to-peer connections. Video calls were introduced in August 2020. According to Telegram, there is a neural network working to learn various technical parameters about a call to provide better quality of service for future uses.

Telegram added group voice chats in December 2020 and group video chats in June 2021. Group voice and video chats support picture-in-picture video, as well as sharing one's screen, creating a recording of the call, noise suppression and selective muting. In channels, users can start a livestream, that is able to integrate with third-party apps such as OBS Studio and XSplit.

Once launched, a group voice chat will remain active and open to all group members until an admin specifically closes it.

=== Privacy and security features ===
By default, logging into Telegram requires either an SMS message sent to the registered number or a code message sent to one of the active sessions on another device. Users have the option to set a two-step verification password and add a recovery email. In late 2022, options to Sign in with Apple and Sign In with Google or with an email address were added. Whenever a new device successfully logs in to a user's account, a special service notification is sent and a login alert is displayed in the chat list of their other devices.

In the Privacy and Security submenu of Settings, users have the option to hide their "Last Seen" status, which reflects the last time the user opened a Telegram app. Hiding the status obfuscates the exact time the user was online and hides the statuses of other people respectively. Similarly, users can hide their phone number and profile photo from people based on categories such as Non-Contacts or by adding exceptions. When a user chooses to hide their profile photo, they can set an alternative "Public Profile Picture" that will be shown instead.

In the same menu, users can restrict the circle of people who can call them or invite them to groups and channels, while Premium users also have the option to restrict who can send them text and voice messages.

The Devices submenu shows all of the active devices on a user's account and allows them to remotely log out from those devices.

=== Data and storage settings ===
Telegram clients can turn off media autoplay and automatic downloads for both WiFi and mobile data, adjusting them for media type and size. Auto download settings can also be applied based on chat type such as group, channel or private.

Cache settings can be changed to automatically clear the cache once it reaches a certain size or a certain time passes. The interface shows users a visual representation of their storage usage and also lets them sort their cached media by size to clear specific items.

=== Bots ===
In June 2015, Telegram launched a platform for third-party developers to create bots. Bots are Telegram accounts operated by programs. They can respond to messages or mentions directly or can be invited into groups, and are able to perform tasks, integrate with other programs and host mini apps. Bots can accept online payments made with credit cards or Apple Pay. The Dutch website Tweakers reported that an invited bot can potentially read all group messages, when the bot controller changes the access settings silently at a later point in time. Telegram pointed out that it considered implementing a feature that would announce such a status change within the relevant group.

There are also inline bots, which can be used from any chat screen. To activate an inline bot, a user must type the bot's username and a query in the message field. The bot then will offer its content. The user can choose from that content and send it within a chat. Certain approved bots are also able to integrate into the attachment menu, making them accessible in any chat.

Bots can handle transactions provided by Paymentwall, Yandex.Money, Stripe, Ravepay, Razorpay, QiWi and Google Pay for different countries. Bots power Telegram's gaming platform, which utilizes HTML5, so games are loaded on-demand as needed, like ordinary webpages. Games work on iPhone 4 and newer, and on Android 4.4 devices and newer.

People can use Internet Of Things (IoT) services with two-way interaction via IFTTT implemented within Telegram.

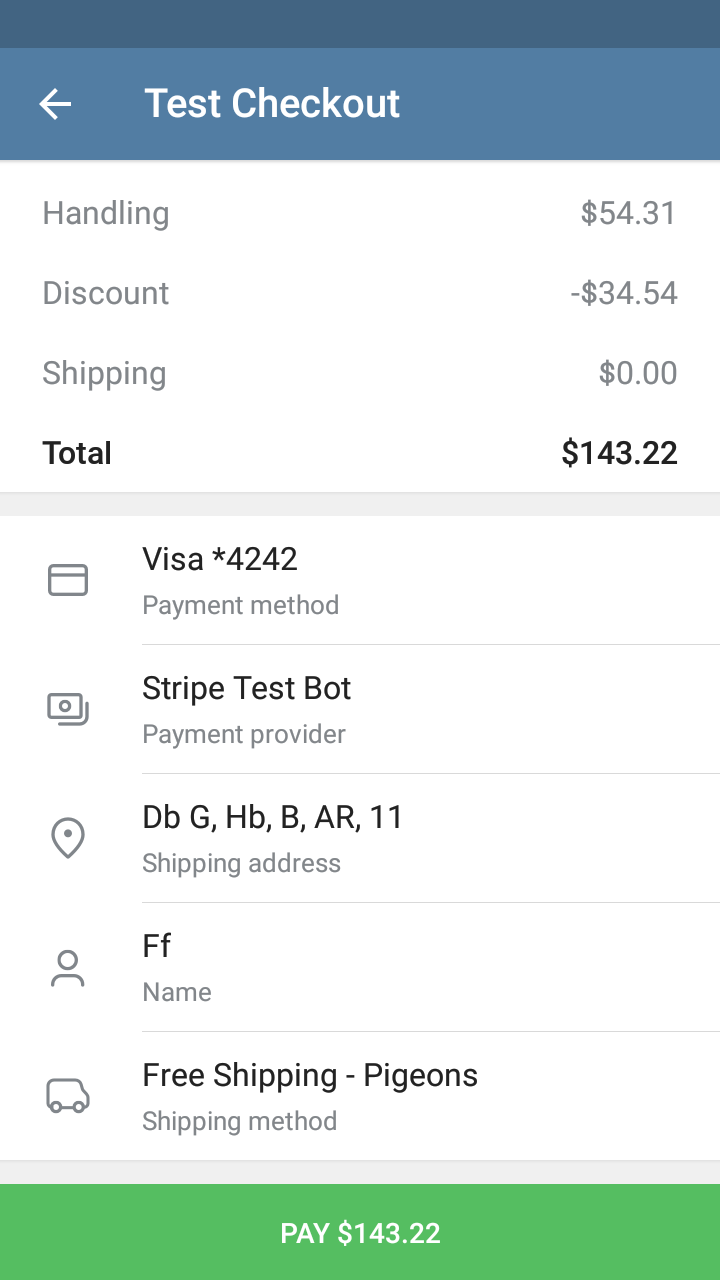
Test order receipt

In April 2021, the Payments 2.0 upgrade enabled bot payments within any chat, using third-party services such as Sberbank, Tranzoo, Payme, CLICK, LiqPay and ECOMMPAY to process the credit card information.

Bots are also commonly used for businesses to communicate with customers as the bot APIs integrate with communication platforms so that Telegram messages can be sent and received in an omnichannelinbox. These platforms also enable businesses to add Telegram chat widget to their websites and gives them the option to automate conversations or let human agents reply. Examples of platforms providing Telegram bot integration include respond.io, Manychat and Trengo.

In February 2018, Telegram launched its social login feature, Telegram Login. It features a website widget that can be embedded into websites, allowing users to sign into a third party website with their Telegram account. The gateway sends the user's Telegram name, username, and profile picture to the website owner, while the user's phone number remains hidden. The gateway is integrated with a bot, which is linked with the developer's specific website domain.

In June 2021, an update introduced a new bot menu where users can browse and send commands while in a chat with a bot.

In April 2022, bots gained support for customized interfaces and inline page loading. Interfaces can be adjusted to match the app's theme even if it changes while interacting with the bot.

In October 2024, Telegram added increased messaging limits for bots, allowing bots to send up to 1000 messages per second to their users. Messages beyond the free limit of 30 per second are paid for using Telegram Stars.

Telegram introduced affiliate programs in December 2024 that allow developers to create an affiliate program for their bot or mini app. Any Telegram user can join the affiliate program and be rewarded for referring others to the bot or mini app by receiving a commission from purchases made by the people they referred.

=== Stickers, emoji, reactions and effects ===
Telegram has more than 40,000 stickers. Stickers are cloud-based, high-resolution images intended to provide more expressive emoji. When typing in an emoji, the user is offered to send the respective sticker instead. Stickers come in collections called "packs", and multiple stickers can be offered for one emoji. Telegram comes with one default sticker pack, and users can install additional sticker packs provided by third-party contributors.

Sticker sets installed from one client become automatically available to all other clients. Sticker images use WebP file format, which is better optimized to be transmitted over the internet. The Telegram clients also support animated emoji. In January 2022, video stickers were added, which use the WebM file format and do not feature any software requirements to create.

In August 2019, Telegram introduced animated emoji, larger versions of familiar emoji with unique animations. In September 2021, Telegram added interactive emoji, a type of animated emoji which also play a fullscreen effect in the chat. These kinds of effects were later used for Premium Stickers in June 2022 and for message effects in May 2024.

In August 2022, Telegram launched an emoji platform where users could upload their own custom emoji, either in animated or static versions. While any user can upload custom emoji to the platform, the use of custom emoji in chats is only available to users with Telegram Premium.

Reactions were first added to Telegram in 2021 and expanded to include more emoji options for Premium users. In September 2022, Telegram gave free users access to dozens of reactions, even some that were only previously available to Premium subscribers. To accommodate the new reactions, the reaction panel was expanded and redesigned.

=== People Nearby and Groups Near Me ===
People Nearby and Groups Near Me were features that helped users contact people in their physical vicinity, using their phone's GPS location. They were removed in 2024, with Durov saying that they had had "issues with bots and scammers".

=== Stories ===
Similar to other social platforms, Telegram users can post stories, a type of short-form content. Telegram stories have several distinctive features, like a dual-camera mode, extra privacy settings, the ability to edit stories after posting them, as well as to rewind and fast-forward them while watching.

=== Premium features ===
Telegram Premium was launched on 19 June 2022 with regional pricing. The optional paid subscription gives users increased limits in the app, such as larger file uploads, faster download speeds, unlimited voice message transcription, as well as numerous other increases such as the number of pinned chats and folders. Premium users have access to extra stickers, emoji, reactions, and customization features like a special badge and the ability to change the look of their messages in chats. Premium users get access to additional settings, like instant chat translation, and the ability to restrict who can send them text and voice messages.

As of 2023, Telegram Premium can be acquired via in-app purchases facilitated by Apple and Google, directly via Telegram's @PremiumBot, or with cryptocurrency on the Fragment platform. Users are able to purchase a subscription for themselves, or purchase a subscription for someone else to send as a gift. Premium subscriptions can also be won through official Channel Giveaways, in which Telegram channels pre-purchase a specific number of Premium subscriptions that are randomly given away to their subscribers.

=== Gifts ===
In October 2024, Telegram launched Gifts, a type of virtual cosmetic item that users can purchase and send to each other in the app using Telegram Stars. In January 2025, Collectible Gifts were released, which are unique collections that contain special artwork and attributes. Specific limited-edition gifts can be upgraded to a collectible version, unlocking a random appearance and other attributes. These collectible gifts are registered on the TON blockchain as a form of NFT and can then be traded or sold both on the Telegram platform via the in-app Gift Marketplace or via outside platforms and marketplaces.

In July 2025, Telegram partnered with the rapper and media figure Snoop Dogg to release a set of limited edition collectible gifts alongside his music video "Gifts". In November 2025, Telegram began using an auction-based system for new sets of collectible gifts and partnered with Khabib Nurmagomedov and with the UFC for two limited-edition releases.

== Related platforms ==
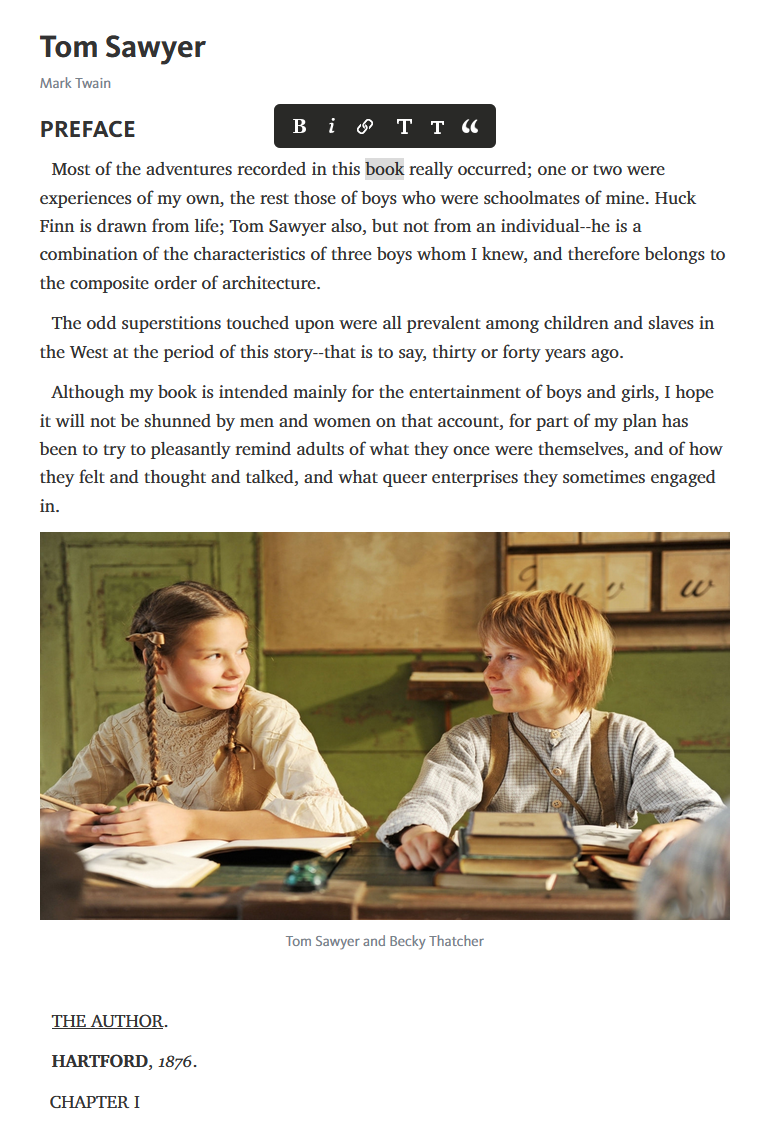
Telegraph article

People can use their Telegram accounts to author articles on Telegraph – a minimalistic text editor and publisher. While articles on Telegraph can be published anonymously, tying them to one's account allows one to check their view count and edit them later. Telegraph natively supports Instant View, a feature which lets users read full articles in the chat with no load time and without opening an external browser.

When an article is first published, the URL is generated automatically from its title. Non-Latin characters are transliterated, spaces are replaced with hyphens, and the date of publication is added to the address. For example, an article titled "Telegraph (blog platform)" published on 17 November would receive the URL /Telegraph-blog-platform-11-17.

Text formatting options are also minimal: two levels of headings, single-level lists, bold, italics, quotes, and hyperlinks are supported. Authors could upload images and videos to the page, with a limit of 5 MB, however, it has been disabled since September 2024. When an author adds links to YouTube, Vimeo, or Twitter, the service allows you to embed their content directly in the article.

In February 2018, Telegram launched their social login feature to its users, named Telegram Login. It features a website widget that could be embedded into websites, allowing users to sign into a third party website with their Telegram account. The gateway sends users' Telegram name, username, and profile picture to the website owner, while users' phone number remains hidden. The gateway is integrated with a bot, which is linked with the developer's specific website domain.

In July 2018, Telegram introduced their online authorization and identity-management system, Telegram Passport, for platforms that require real-life identification. It asks users to upload their own official documents such as passport, identity card, driver license, etc. When an online service requires such identification documents and verification, it forwards the information to the platform with the user's permission. Telegram stated that it does not have access to the data, while the platform will share the information only with the authorized recipient. However, the service was criticised for being vulnerable to online brute-force attacks.

In December 2020, Telegram launched a Bugs and Suggestions platform, where users can submit bug reports and suggestion cards for new features. Others can then vote and comment on the cards.

In October 2024, Telegram launched a verification platform, called Telegram Gateway, allowing third-party services to authenticate their users by sending verification codes via Telegram.

== Architecture ==
=== Privacy ===
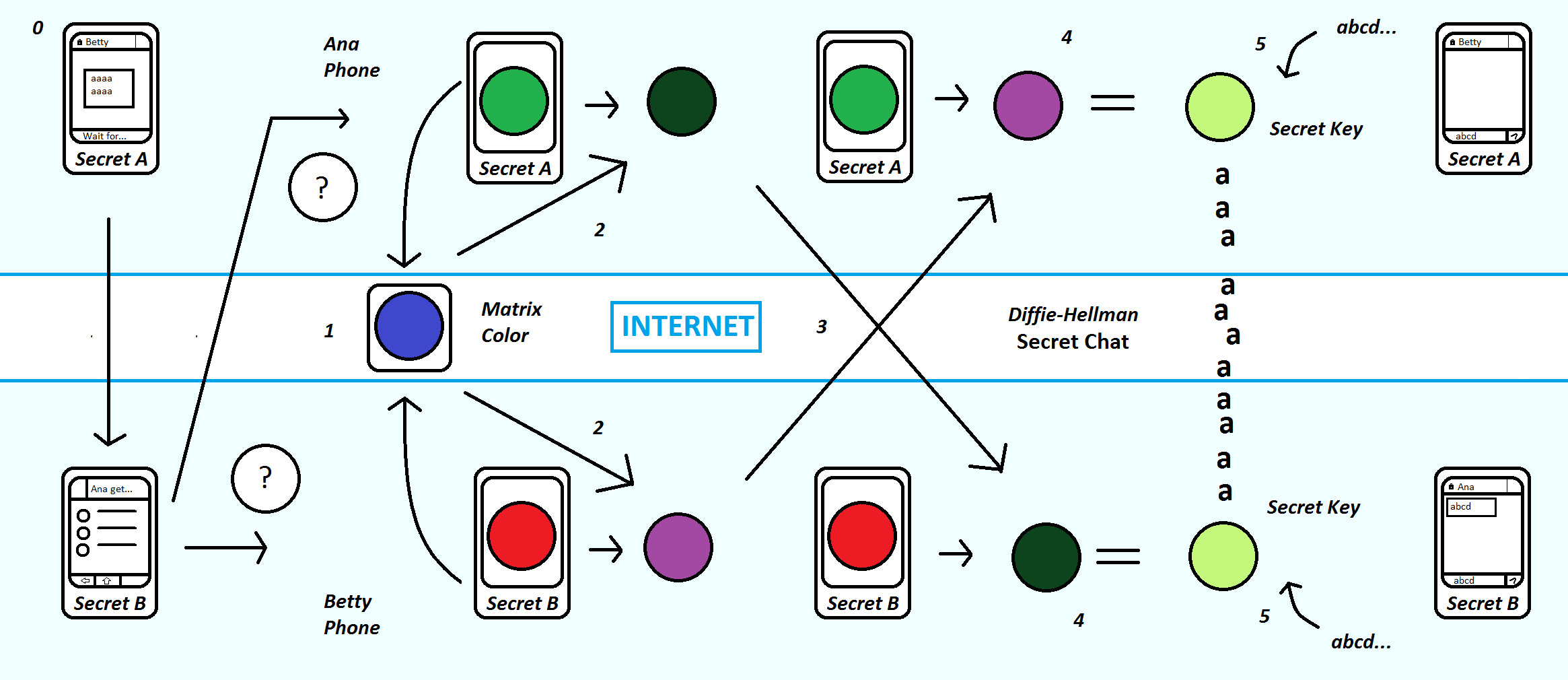
A simplified illustration of the MTProto encryption scheme

For encrypted chats (branded as Secret Chats), Telegram uses a custom-built symmetric encryption scheme called MTProto. The protocol was developed by Nikolai Durov and other developers at Telegram and, as of version 2.0, is based on 256-bit symmetric AES encryption, 2048-bit RSA encryption and Diffie–Hellman key exchange.

MTProto 1.0 was deprecated in favor of MTProto 2.0 in December 2017, which was deployed in Telegram clients as of v4.6.

Version 2.0 was proven formally correct in December 2020 by a team from the University of Udine, Italy. The team reviewed the protocol after realizing that they could only find in-depth verifications done of version 1.0, where most criticisms were levied. They used ProVerif, a verifier based on the symbolic Dolev-Yao model. In the published paper, they "provide a fully automated proof of the soundness of MTProto 2.0’s protocols for authentication, normal chat, end-to-end encrypted chat, and re-keying mechanisms with respect to several security properties, including authentication, integrity, confidentiality and perfect forward secrecy...MTProto 2.0 is assumed to be a perfect authenticated encryption scheme (IND-CCA and INT-CTXT)."

However, the team also stated that because all communication, including plaintext and ciphertext, passes through Telegram servers, and because the server is responsible for choosing Diffie–Hellman parameters, the "server should not be considered as trusted." They also concluded that a man-in-the-middle attack is possible if users fail to check the fingerprints of their shared keys. Finally, they qualified their conclusion with the caveat that "properties need to be formally proved in order to deem MTProto 2.0 definitely secure. This proof cannot be done in a symbolic model like ProVerif's, but it can be achieved in a computational model, using tools like CryptoVerif or EasyCrypt."

=== Servers ===
As with most instant messaging protocols, apart from XMPP, Telegram uses centralized servers. Telegram Messenger LLP has servers in a number of countries throughout the world to improve the response time of their service. Telegram's server-side software is closed-source and proprietary. Pavel Durov said that it would require a major architectural redesign of the server-side software to connect independent servers to the Telegram cloud.

For users who signed in from the European Economic Area (EEA) or United Kingdom, the General Data Protection Regulations (GDPR) are supported by storing data only on servers in the Netherlands, and designating a London-based company as their responsible data controller.

=== Clients ===
Telegram has various client apps, some developed by Telegram Messenger LLP and some by the community. Most of them are free and open-source and released under the GNU General Public Licence version 2 or 3. The official clients support sending any file format extensions. The built-in media viewer supports common media formats – JPEG, PNG, WebP for images and H.264 and HEVC in videos in MP4 container and MP3, FLAC, Vorbis, Opus and AAC for audio. This enables the building of clients for non-traditional platforms like KaiOS (supported by Telekram), or S30+/Mocor Feature phones (still in development).

In 2021, the Telegram team announced a direct build of its Android app. Telegram for Android is available directly from the Telegram website. It is automatically updated and will most likely get new versions faster than the apps in the Play Store and App Store. A distinctive feature of this version is the ability to view channels/groups on a specific topic without censorship, which cannot be viewed from an app distributed from Google Play or the Apple Store due to their policies.

Common specifications:

- No cloud backup option for secret chat

Name	Platform(s)	Official	Source code license	Support for secret chats	Notes
Telegram	Android and Wear OS	Yes	GPLv2 or later	Yes	Supports tablets and Wear OS smart watches. Support synchronisation between multiple devices.
Telegram	iOS, iPadOS and watchOS	Yes	GPLv2 or later	Yes	Launched in August 2013 for iPhone and iPod Touch and relaunched in July 2014 with support for iPad and Apple Watch.
Telegram X	Android	Yes	GPLv3 or later	Yes	An alternative Telegram client written from scratch, with higher speed, slicker animations, themes and more efficient battery use. iOS version was written with Swift. Android version based on TDLib. The iOS version was discontinued, with its code merged with the main Telegram app.
Telegram Messenger	Windows Phone	Yes	GPLv2 or later	Yes	Provide synchronization between all platforms. No longer supported.
Telegram Desktop	Windows, macOS, and Linux	Yes	GPLv3 with OpenSSL exception	No	Qt-based desktop client. The Windows client is a traditional desktop app published in three flavors (with installer, portable, Windows Store app). The desktop version cannot be used anymore to register and log in, this feature is officially supported by the mobile app only.
Telegram	macOS	Yes	GPLv2	Yes	Native macOS client.
Telegram Web A / Web K	Web	Yes	GPLv3	No	Two web-based versions of Telegram. The web version cannot be used to register and log in, this feature is officially supported by the mobile app only. The code for the legacy web client called Webogram is available as well, though this version is no longer supported.

=== APIs ===
Telegram has public APIs with which developers can access the same functionality as Telegram's official apps to build their own instant messaging applications. In February 2015, creators of the unofficial WhatsApp+ client released the Telegram Plus app, later renamed to Plus Messenger, after their original project got a cease-and-desist order from WhatsApp. In September 2015, Samsung released a messaging application based on these APIs.

Telegram also offers an API that allows developers to create bots, which are accounts controlled by programs. Such bots are used, among other things, to emulate and play old games in the app and inform users about vaccine availability for COVID-19.

In addition, Telegram offers functions for making payments directly within the platform, alongside an external service such as Stripe.

== AI features ==
In 2026, Telegram began to include generative AI features in its app, which use open-source models running in Telegram's confidential compute network, Cocoon. In January 2026, AI summaries were introduced, which allow users to summarize long posts in channels or the text of articles that support Instant View. In March 2026, Telegram launched an AI text editor, where users can use AI to translate or stylize their message text.

In 2025, Durov announced an agreement with xAI to bring AI features to the Telegram app, but the partnership never materialized. According to media reports, Telegram backed away from third-party partnerships with existing AI companies to prioritize user privacy, ultimately leading to the development and launch of Cocoon.

== Business ==
Telegram was initially supported by founding CEO Pavel Durov's personal funds after the sale of his stake in VK. In January 2018, it launched a private placement and collected $1.7 billion from investors such as Kleiner Perkins, Sequoia Capital, and Benchmark. After the shutdown of the TON project, the company needed to repay the investors the money that was not spent on its development during 2018 and the beginning of 2019, while the project was active.

On 15 March 2021, Telegram conducted a five-year public bonds placement worth $1 billion. The funding was required to cover the debts amounting to $625.7 million, including $433 million to investors who bought futures for Gram tokens in 2018 and included purchasers such as David Yakobashvili. On 23 March, Telegram sold additional bonds worth $150 million to the Abu Dhabi Mubadala Investment Company and Abu Dhabi Catalyst Partners. In March 2026, Durov announced that Telegram had fully repaid the bonds issued in 2021.

A day later, the Mubadala Investment Company stated that Russia's sovereign wealth fund participated in its deal undisclosed through the Russia-UAE joint investment platform to buy convertible bonds. A Telegram spokesperson stated: "RDIF is not in the list of investors we sold bonds to. We wouldn't be open to any transaction with this fund" and "[t]he funds that did invest, including Mubadala, confirmed to us that RDIF was not among their LPs [limited partners]." According to the contract, the holders of the bonds will be provided with an option to convert them to shares at a 10% discount if the company conducts an open IPO.

Durov stated that the move aimed to "enable Telegram to continue growing globally while sticking to its values and remaining independent". According to press reports, prior to the bonds placement, Durov had rejected an investment offer for a 5–10% stake in the company as well as several undisclosed ones, valuing the company in a $30–40 billion range. In March 2024, Telegram sold an additional $330 million in bonds. Durov said the bond sale "will further solidify our position as an independent platform that is able to challenge the 'Goliaths' of our industry".

=== Advertising and monetization ===
Telegram has stated that the company will never serve advertisements in private chats. In late 2020, Durov announced that the company was working on its own ad platform, and would integrate non-targeted ads in public one-to-many channels, that already were selling and displaying ads in the form of regular messages. Ads from Telegram's "Sponsored Messages" platform began to appear in channels with more than 1000 followers in October 2021.

In late 2020, Durov announced that Telegram will consider adding paid features aimed at enterprise clients. According to him, these features will require more bandwidth and the added cost will be covered by the feature prices, in addition to covering some of the costs incurred by regular users.

In June 2024, Telegram launched Telegram Stars to facilitate in-app purchases of digital goods and services, in compliance with policies from the App Store and Play Store. Following the launch of Stars, Telegram released several updates to their functionality, such as allowing Stars to be used to unlock media in channels or to buy gifts for other users.

In December 2024, Telegram CEO Pavel Durov announced that Telegram had reached profitability, due to significant growth in Premium subscriptions and Telegram ad sales, assisted by the other monetization features launched throughout 2024.

=== TON Telegram Open Network ===
In 2017, in an attempt to monetize Telegram without advertising, the company began the development of a blockchain platform dubbed either "The Open Network" or "Telegram Open Network" (TON) and its native cryptocurrency "Gram". The project was announced in mid-December 2017 and its 132-page technical paper became available in January 2018. The codebase behind TON was developed by Pavel Durov's brother Nikolai Durov, the core developer of Telegram's MTProto protocol. In January 2018, a 23-page white paper and a detailed 132-page technical paper for TON blockchain became available.

Durov planned to power TON with the existing Telegram user base, and turn it into the largest blockchain and a platform for apps and services akin to a decentralized WeChat, Google Play, and App Store. Besides, the TON had the potential to become a decentralized alternative to Visa and MasterCard due to its ability to scale and support millions of transactions per second. In January and February 2018, the company ran a private sale of futures contracts for Grams, raising around $1.7 billion. No public offering took place.

The development of TON took place in a completely isolated manner, and the release was postponed several times. The test network was launched in January 2019. The launch of the TON main network was scheduled for 31 October. On 30 October, the U.S. Securities and Exchange Commission obtained a temporary restrictive order to prevent the distribution of Grams to initial purchasers; the regulator considered the legal scheme employed by Telegram as an unregistered securities offering with initial buyers acting as underwriters.

The judge hearing the Telegram v. SEC case, P. Kevin Castel, ultimately agreed with the SEC's argument and kept the restrictions on Gram distribution in force. The ban applied to non-U.S.-based purchasers as well, because Telegram could not prevent the re-sale of Grams to U.S. citizens on a secondary market, as the anonymity of users was one of the key features of TON. Following that, Durov announced the end of Telegram's active involvement with TON. On 26 June, the judge approved the settlement between Telegram and SEC. The company agreed to pay an $18.5 million penalty and return $1.22 billion to Gram purchasers. In March 2021, Telegram launched a bonds offering to cover the debt and fund further growth of the app.

== Criticism ==
Security experts criticize Telegram for misleading users about message encryption. Telegram’s website says that all user messages are encrypted, but in fact, only Secret Chats use end-to-end encryption. All other chats are encrypted only in transit to Telegram’s servers; they are decrypted on the servers, where Telegram staff can access the conversations.

Telegram’s 2013 security contest drew widespread criticism from cryptography experts. The challenge was to decrypt private messages exchanged between Pavel and his brother Nikolai via “Secret Chats.” It used a ciphertext-only attack model—the weakest model, yet one of the most difficult and least practical for a cryptanalyst. As a result, the contest was of little use in identifying real-world vulnerabilities.

The MTProto encryption protocol has been criticized by cryptography experts. They note that Telegram uses a complex, custom-built protocol alongside proprietary server software. The first version of the protocol, MTProto v1, contained a flaw that could allow Telegram’s servers to silently replace encryption keys in Secret Chats, enabling a man-in-the-middle attack that users would not see. Cryptography expert Filippo Valsorda called the flaw “the most backdoor-looking bug” he had ever seen.

An independent security review found that auth_key_id — a device-related identifier included in MTProto packet headers — is transmitted in a form that may be visible to observers who can monitor network traffic. Researchers argue that, if the identifier remains stable over time, internet service providers, network operators, or intelligence agencies with access to relevant network infrastructure could use it to correlate a user’s Telegram activity across connections and locations. This could expose patterns such as when a device connects or changes networks, and potentially help link activity to an IP address or approximate location.

Because Telegram is both a private communication method and a social media-like platform with mass groups and channels, and because it has minimal content restrictions, with only calls to violence, illegal forms of pornography, and scamming forbidden, organizations and large groups have used it for recruitment and spreading their agendas. It has been used to organize pro-democracy protests in Belarus, Russia, Hong Kong, and Iran, and to disseminate state propaganda and violent rhetoric in oppressive regimes, promote extremist views, and digitalize services provided by government entities and private businesses.

Many research institutions and internet monitoring bodies have criticized Telegram because violent organizations like ISIS, Proud Boys, and the Myanmar junta used it to communicate, both privately between members and publicly through channel posts. Telegram made substantial efforts to ban illegal content such as child abuse and pro-terrorist channels, including a partnership with Europol to eliminate ISIS presence on the platform, but communities of far-right extremist users are still on the app. Such content is usually linked to Telegram allowing misinformation on the platform as, according to Pavel Durov, "conspiracy theories only strengthen each time their content is removed by moderators".

In September 2024, Telegram announced that it would begin to hand over users' IP addresses and phone numbers to authorities who have search warrants or other valid legal requests.

=== Russian use for destabilization activities ===
Martin Jäger, the head of Germany's Federal Intelligence Service (BND), warned that Russia was recruiting saboteurs across Europe through Telegram by monitoring pro-Russian channels to identify potential "low-level agents" for small acts of sabotage, surveillance or provocation in exchange of small payments.

According to a study by the international analysis company OpenMinds published on the eve of the 2025 Moldovan parliamentary election, which was subject to external interference from Russia, a third of all Telegram channels in Moldova systematically spread Russian propaganda and one in eight comments came from bots. Moldovan president Maia Sandu denounced that Telegram refused any collaboration with the Moldovan state authorities against illegal activities taking place in its platform such as vote buying.

=== Use by militant groups ===
In September 2015, in response to a question about the use of Telegram by Islamic State (ISIS), Pavel Durov stated: "I think that privacy, ultimately, and our right for privacy is more important than our fear of bad things happening, like terrorism." Durov sarcastically suggested to ban words because terrorists use them for communication.

ISIS has used Telegram for recruiting attempts with some cells recommending the app to their followers. In France, initial investigations of a terrorist act revealed the perpetrators used Telegram to communicate, though follow-up research suggested that the extent of the app's use was "unclear". Beginning in December 2016, Telegram began publishing daily moderation statistics regarding terror-related content in an official channel named @ISISwatch. Following efforts by Telegram to remove ISIS-related content from the platform, the terrorist organization reportedly moved its recruitment groups to the dark web, with US officials citing the app's purging of terrorist content as particularly effective at deplatforming ISIS.

Hamas and the Palestinian Islamic Jihad used Telegram heavily during their October 7 attack on Southern Israel to disseminate attack-related images, videos, and other propaganda.

In 2023, Saudi Arabia's Global Center for Combating Extremist Ideology (Etidal) reported that in collaboration with Telegram, over 59 million pieces of extremist content had been removed from the platform since 2022.

Throughout 2020, the Islamic Revolutionary Guard Corps used groups and channels to dox Iraqi and Iranian citizens, while sharing propagandistic posts on the platform. After the 2021 coup d'état in Myanmar, the junta used Telegram channels to spread propaganda and organize misinformation campaigns against pro-democracy groups. In response to the Office of the United Nations High Commissioner for Human Rights call to prevent such abuse, Telegram reportedly banned 13 accounts related to or supporting the Myanmar military.

On 26 April 2023, Telegram was temporarily suspended in Brazil and fined R$1 million (2023) (US$178,794.92) per day for not complying with a Federal Police investigation into neo-Nazi activities on the platform. The company only partially fulfilled a court request for personal data on two antisemitic Telegram groups, which authorities considered an intentional lack of cooperation. The decision was made after a series of violent school attacks, with at least one incident linked to exchanges on an antisemitic group. Telegram's CEO then said that the requested data was technologically impossible to obtain. A federal court lifted the suspension three days later but upheld the daily fine. Twelve days later, Telegram told its users that the Brazilian Congressional Bill No. 2630 against online disinformation, which was about to be approved, would end freedom of speech in the country.

Far-right and white supremacist communities on Telegram have spread videos of the Christchurch and Halle shootings in groups and channels after the original livestreams were taken down by Twitch. British far-right publication TR.news, following multiple deplatformings, launched a Telegram channel to spread its posts and the Institute for Strategic Dialogue reported that Irish far-right groups grew substantially between 2019 and 2020. But research by Oxford University suggests that, because Telegram does not use sorting algorithms in its search function, many such groups remain obscure and small while select others receive a lot of attention.

=== Illegal pornography ===
Telegram has been used to distribute illegal pornography, including child pornography. Telegram's internal reporting system has an option to report content that contains child abuse, including specific messages in groups and channels. The company has a verified channel called "Stop Child Abuse", where daily statistics on the number of groups and channels banned for sharing illegal materials are posted. It also provides an email address dedicated to reports of content related to child abuse.

In January 2021, North Macedonian media outlets reported that a now-banned Telegram group, "Public Room" ("Јавна соба"), with more than 7,000 members, was used to share nude photos of women and young teenage girls. Along with the shared photographs, anonymous accounts shared the women's private information, including phone numbers and social media profiles, encouraging members of the group to contact the women and ask for sexual favors. This was done without the women's agreement or knowledge, causing intense public backlash and demand that the group be shut down. North Macedonia President Stevo Pendarovski and Prime Minister Zoran Zaev demanded an immediate response from Telegram and threatened to completely restrict access to the app in the country if no action was taken. The group was banned, but no public statement was made.

An August 2024 BBC investigation found that Telegram had not responded to requests to join the US–based National Center for Missing & Exploited Children (NCMEC) or the UK–based Internet Watch Foundation, both nonprofit NGOs. In response, Telegram said that it "proactively moderates harmful content on its platform including child abuse material" and that its moderation is "within industry standards and constantly improving".

In August 2024, journalist Ko Narin of the Hankyoreh exposed Telegram chats of teenagers who used generative AI to deepfake images of their classmates and teachers for porn.

A February 2026 BBC investigation by journalist Wanqing Zhang found that Telegram was widely used to advertise and distribute non-consensual hidden camera pornography, including footage secretly filmed in hotel rooms across China, and that requests to remove such content often went unanswered. In response, Telegram said that sharing non-consensual pornography is forbidden under its terms of service and that it "proactively moderates" harmful content on the platform.

=== Bot abuse ===
Volodymyr Flents, the chairman of the public organization "Electronic Democracy", announced on 11 May 2020 that a Telegram bot appeared on the Web, which sold the personal data of Ukrainian citizens. It is estimated that the bot contains data from 26 million Ukrainians registered in the Diia application. But deputy prime minister and minister of digital transformation Mykhailo Fedorov denied that any data from the app had leaked. The criminal activity of 25 people was confirmed and copies of 30 databases were seized.

In 2020, Apple blocked a Telegram bot after it posted deepfake pornography. The same year, Telegram reportedly banned more than 350,000 bots and channels, including those that contained child abuse and terrorism-related content.

In 2021, a bot was found selling leaked phone numbers from Facebook.

=== Fraudulent jobs ===
Telegram has received criticism for its failure to curb fraud. The most common mode of fraud involves scammers sending messages to unsuspecting users, offering part-time online jobs that comprise a series of tasks. Scammers employ a variety of confidence tricks to entice users into completing "prepaid tasks" in which users deposit money into scammers' accounts with the expectation of receiving high returns.

In July 2023, Hyderabad Police uncovered a fraud wherein 15,000 Indian citizens were duped out of ₹712 crore (US$76 million) in less than a year, all related to "prepaid tasks" on Telegram. A cybercrime police investigation of the money trail revealed that the fraud originated in China and the money was laundered by mules through cryptocurrency wallets.

In September 2023, the Singapore Police Force stated that more than 6,600 Singaporeans had lost over S$96.8 million (US$72.24 million) to prepaid job scams on Telegram and WhatsApp since the start of the year.

=== Copyright infringement ===
In March 2024, a judge of Spain's Audiencia Nacional ordered the temporary blocking of Telegram in Spain. The order came following a complaint from media organizations —Mediaset, Atresmedia and Movistar Plus+— saying the app allowed users to share copyrighted content without their consent. A few days later, following repeated criticism, the same judge suspended his order until the police issue a report on the consequences this measure would have for users. Finally, the judge annulled the order, considering it "disproportionate".

=== Drug trade ===
In recent years, Telegram has become more popular for the purpose of buying and selling illicit drugs. In 2024, Sociology Compass released a paper exploring this trend in drug trade.

=== User numbers ===
In August 2024, an EU probe was launched into Telegram to determine whether the platform breached EU digital rules by failing to provide accurate user numbers. Telegram said in February 2024 that it had 41mn users in the EU. Under the EU's Digital Services Act (DSA), Telegram was supposed to provide an updated number in August but failed to do so, only declaring it had "significantly fewer than 45mn average monthly active recipients in the EU".

=== Advertisements ===
As part of the monetization model, Telegram can display advertisement banners for non-premium users in public channels with more than 1000 subscribers. The revenue of these advertisements is shared with the channel owner in form of Telegram's Toncoin crypto currency. As of August 2025, there was no option for channel owners to opt out of this mechanism. This is seen as an issue for non-profit organizations and similar entities who want to operate a Telegram channel.

In August 2025, the German public media broadcaster NDR closed its tagesschau Telegram channel, which published summaries of news stories from the German television news service by the same name. The TV program and news stories are produced for the joint organization ARD to be simulcast by its members. The editorial staff was made aware of the advertisement by a Telegram user and the online magazine Übermedien. They argued the advertisements could be seen as a violation of the Rundfunkstaatsvertrag (Interstate Broadcasting Agreement), which places strict rules on how German public media broadcasters may generate revenue from advertisements, including an advertisement ban for online media apart from product placement. Additional criticism was expressed as some advertisements were described as "shady" or "fraudulent" offerings on sports bets. The NDR said it had not noticed these ads before, but closed the channel, saying that an advertisement-based accumulation of Toncoin, albeit unsolicited and not withdrawn, was unacceptable for a German public media broadcaster.

=== Use by scam syndicates ===
In 2025, Telegram said it blocked Huione Guarantee, which Elliptic described as an escrow-style marketplace operating across thousands of Telegram channels and widely used by online scammers based in scam centers in Cambodia. Huione lists businessman Hun To, cousin of Cambodian Prime Minister Hun Manet, as a director.

=== Use for sexual violence ===
In 2024, German law enforcement uncovered an international criminal network operating on Telegram under the name "Fahrschule für Experten in Deutschland" (lit. 'German Old Driver Driving School'). Composed primarily of Chinese nationals residing in Europe and North America, the group used encrypted Telegram chats to coordinate, instruct, and share recorded media of drug-facilitated sexual assaults. Members used specialized automotive terminology as coded language to refer to victims. The group also facilitated the illegal sale and distribution of prescription sedatives and medical anesthetics. International law enforcement cooperation led to multiple arrests and convictions across several jurisdictions, including Germany, the United Kingdom, and the United States.

=== Aggregation of leaked data ===
Telegram has been criticized for a vulnerability that makes it possible to connect a user's numerical ID with other personal information. The ID itself does not reveal one's phone number or full name, but it can be used to trace a Telegram account through public profiles, previous usernames, group activity, and data stored in third-party databases.

OSINT services such as "Glaz Boga" can start with a Telegram ID and retrieve information from multiple sources. Some of this data comes from Russian leaks, including the Yandex Food and Gemotest breaches. As a result, a Telegram ID can yield a much broader range of personal information than a person has publicly shared on their Telegram profile.

Leak aggregators have also obtained datasets sourced directly from Telegram. Media reports have described databases maintained by services that collect and sell personal information, including users' requests to Telegram Support. These records contained Telegram IDs, usernames, and messages sent to support. In some cases, they also included names, phone numbers, device information, and details showing whether a user had a Telegram Premium subscription.

== Reception ==
Channels have been used by celebrities such as Arnold Schwarzenegger and Snoop Dogg and politicians: President of France Emmanuel Macron, former President of Brazil Jair Bolsonaro, Turkish President Recep Tayyip Erdoğan, President of Moldova Maia Sandu, President of Ukraine Volodymyr Zelenskyy, former President of Mexico Andrés Manuel López Obrador, former Singaporean Prime Minister Lee Hsien Loong, President of Uzbekistan Shavkat Mirziyoyev, former Taiwan President Tsai Ing-wen, Ethiopian Prime Minister Abiy Ahmed, Israeli Prime Minister Benjamin Netanyahu and others.

=== Security ===
In 2016, cryptography experts criticized how, unless modified, Telegram's default general security model stores all contacts, messages and media together with their decryption keys on its servers continuously and does not enable end-to-end encryption for messages. Durov has argued that this is because it helps to avoid third-party unsecured backups, and to allow users to access messages and files from any device. Criticisms were also aimed at Telegram's use of a custom-designed encryption protocol.

In December 2020, a study titled "Automated Symbolic Verification of Telegram's MTProto 2.0" was published, confirming the security of the updated MTProto 2.0 and reviewing it while pointing out several theoretical vulnerabilities. The paper provides "fully automated proof of the soundness of MTProto 2.0's authentication, normal chat, end-to-end encrypted chat, and re-keying mechanisms with respect to several security properties, including authentication, integrity, confidentiality and perfect forward secrecy" and "proves the formal correctness of MTProto 2.0". This partially addresses the concern about the lack of scrutiny while confirming the formal security of the protocol's latest version.

As of 2014, the desktop clients, excluding the macOS client, do not feature options for end-to-end encrypted messages. When the user assigns a local password in the desktop application, data is also locally encrypted. Telegram has defended the lack of ubiquitous end-to-end encryption by saying that online-backups that do not use client-side encryption are "the most secure solution currently possible".

Security researcher Moxie Marlinspike, founder of the competing Signal messenger, and commenters on Hacker News criticized a 2013 contest to break its cryptography for being rigged or framed in Telegram's favor and said that Telegram's statements on the value of these contests as proof of the cryptography's quality are misleading. This was because the cryptography contest could not be won even with completely broken algorithms such as MD2 (hash function) used as key stream extractor, and primitives such as the Dual EC DRBG that is known to be backdoored.

=== Censorship ===
Map showing the countries that are either currently blocking or have blocked Telegram in the past. Currently blocked Formerly blocked

Telegram has been blocked temporarily or permanently by some governments including Iran, China, Brazil, and Pakistan. The Russian government blocked Telegram for several years before lifting the ban in 2020. The company's founder has said he wants the app to have an anti-censorship tool for Iran and China similar to the app's role in fighting censorship in Russia. On 19 April 2024, Apple removed Telegram from the App Store in China.

In September 2024, Ukraine banned the usage of Telegram by government officials, military personnel, and key workers on official devices, citing fears of Russian espionage. The National Security and Defense Council of Ukraine enforced the restrictions following evidence reported to them by Kyrylo Budanov, showing Russia's ability to access messages and user data on the platform. Andriy Kovalenko, head of the security council's centre on countering disinformation, clarified that the ban was limited to official devices and did not extend to personal phones.

In February 2026, Russia restricted Telegram, as officials said the platform failed to protect personal data and curb criminal content. Durov responded that Telegram remained committed to protecting freedom of speech and user privacy, and accused Russian authorities of directing users toward a state-backed platform, presumably Max. Over the summer of 2026, the share of active Russian-language channels posting links to Max doubled, reaching about one in fifty by August.

==== 2019 Puerto Rico "Telegramgate" ====
Telegram was the main subject surrounding the 2019 Puerto Rico riots that ended up in the resignation of then-Governor Ricardo Rosselló. Hundreds of pages of a group chat between Rosselló and members of his staff were leaked. The messages were considered vulgar, racist, and homophobic, with members of the chat discussing how they would use the media to target potential political opponents.

==== 2021 shutdown of Russian political bots ====
In September 2021, prior to the regional elections in Russia, Telegram suspended several bots spreading information about the election, including a bot run by the opposition party and critics of incumbent president Vladimir Putin's government, citing election silence as the reason, though a blog post by the company's CEO implied the company was following Apple and Google, which "dictate the rules of the game to developers". The blocking of the main Smart Voting bot was criticized by allies of Alexei Navalny, a Kremlin critic and former opposition leader. Navalny's spokeswoman Kira Yarmysh called the block and the deletion of the tactical voting app from app stores "censorship [...] imposed by private companies".

In a later blog post, Durov directly stated that the block was a result of pressure from Google and Apple as refusal to comply with their policies would result "in an immediate shutdown of Telegram for millions of users". The post included a screenshot showing an internal email sent by the App Store to developers, demanding the takedown of content related to Navalny.

==== 2022 Delhi High Court ruling ====
On 24 November 2022, Telegram disclosed the admin names, phone numbers and IP addresses of channels accused of unauthorised sharing of national exam study materials following an order by the Delhi High Court which rejected Telegram's argument that its regional servers were located in Singapore and thus no data could be disclosed as the local laws prohibit it.

==== 2024 arrest of Pavel Durov ====
On 24 August 2024, Pavel Durov, who is both a French and UAE citizen, was arrested in France by French authorities. On 28 August he was charged with a wide array of crimes, including complicity in managing an online platform to enable illegal transactions; complicity in crimes such as enabling the distribution of child sexual abuse material; drug trafficking and fraud; and refusal to cooperate with law enforcement authorities. Durov posted bail of five million Euros, was barred from leaving France, and was released on condition he report to a French police station twice weekly. The case would be handled by a special magistrate with investigative and prosecutorial powers.

==== 2026 India ban ====
In June 2026, the Government of India temporarily blocked access to Telegram ahead of a re-conducted National Eligibility-cum-Entrance Test (NEET) examination, citing concerns that the platform had been used to distribute leaked examination papers. Telegram challenged the restriction before the Delhi High Court, arguing that the ban would affect millions of legitimate users while doing little to prevent examination fraud. Telegram CEO Pavel Durov criticized the decision, saying that the company had removed hundreds of channels associated with leaked examination materials and scams in India. At the time of the restriction, Telegram reported having more than 150 million active users in India.

In October 2026, 404 Media reported that a letter included in US federal court records showed Telegram had provided US authorities with a user's account ID, phone number and IP address, along with the time of the account's last login. The letter, dated 4 September 2026, described the disclosure as voluntary and stated that Telegram was not conceding that it was subject to US jurisdiction or that the request had been properly served. The filing containing the letter was submitted to the court on 15 October 2026.

==== 2026 Jordan and Iraq ban ====
On November 16 2026, Jordan's Public Security Directorate announced the blocking of Telegram in Jordan, citing the app being used as a tool for spreading illegal content. Simultaneously the same day, Iraq also announced it had banned Telegram for similar reasons. Iraq had previously banned the app in August 2023 and April 2026.

Durov expressed regret over the ban on the app in Iraq, but stressed that his app refuses to censor freedom of political expression.

== See also ==
- Alt-tech – Internet platforms favored by the alt-right
- Censorship of Telegram
- Comparison of cross-platform instant messaging clients
- Internet privacy
- List of social platforms with at least 100 million active users
- Secure instant messaging

== Sources ==
- Espinoza, Antonio; Tolley, William (August 2017). "Alice and Bob, who the FOCI are they?: Analysis of end-to-end encryption in the LINE messaging application" (PDF). Usenix. USENIX Association. Archived (PDF) from the original on 11 May 2021.
- Rottermanner, Christoph; Kieseberg, Peter; Huber, Markus; Schmiedecker, Martin; Schrittwieser, Sebastian (December 2015). Privacy and Data Protection in Smartphone Messengers (PDF). Proceedings of the 17th International Conference on Information Integration and Web-based Applications & Services (iiWAS2015). ACM International Conference Proceedings Series. ISBN 978-1-4503-3491-4. Archived (PDF) from the original on 27 March 2016.
