= Nikolai Durov =

Russian programmer and mathematician (born 1980)

- Николай Дуров
- Born: 21 November 1980 (age 45); Leningrad, Soviet Union
- Citizenship: Russia; Saint Kitts and Nevis; Latvia
- Education: Saint Petersburg State University, University of Bonn
- Occupations: Programmer, mathematician
- Known for: Founding VK; Founding Telegram Messenger
- Father: Valery Durov
- Relatives: Pavel Durov (brother)
- Awards: St. Petersburg Mathematical Society Young Mathematician Prize (2006)
- Website: www.pdmi.ras.ru/eng/perso/durov.php

Nikolai Valeryevich Durov (Note: In this name that follows East Slavic naming customs, the patronymic is Valeryevich and the family name is Durov.) (Russian: Николай Валерьевич Дуров; born 21 November 1980) is a Russian-Latvian programmer and mathematician. He is the elder brother of Pavel Durov, with whom he founded the social networking site VK and later Telegram Messenger. He is considered to be reserved and rarely appears in public.

== Early life and education ==
Durov was born into a Russian family. His father is Valery Durov, a Doctor of Philological Sciences and a professor of philology during Nikolai's time at Saint Petersburg State University. As a youth, he reportedly could read at an adult level by age three and solve cubic equations by age eight.

Competing as "Nikolai Dourov", he won gold at the International Mathematical Olympiad in the three years he participated of 1996, 1997, and 1998. Furthermore, participating in each yearly contest from 1995 through 1998, he accrued three silver medals and one gold medal in the International Olympiad in Informatics. With his friend Andrey Lopatin, Durov was a member of the Saint Petersburg State University ACM team, which won the gold at the ACM International Collegiate Programming Contest World Finals in 2000 and 2001.

He received his first PhD from Saint Petersburg State University in 2005 with his thesis "New Approach to Arakelov Geometry". Continuing at the University of Bonn, he obtained in 2007 a second PhD under the supervision of Gerd Faltings with his thesis on singular Arakelov geometry.

== Career ==
=== Research ===
Durov introduced commutative algebraic monads as a generalization of local objects in a generalized algebraic geometry. Versions of a tropical geometry, of an absolute geometry over a field with one element and an algebraic analogue of Arakelov theory were realized in this setup.

He held the position of senior research fellow at the Laboratory of Algebra and Number Theory at the St. Petersburg Department of Steklov Mathematical Institute of the Russian Academy of Sciences.

=== Other work ===
- Durov worked as a lead developer of the VK team until 2013.
- Together with his brother Pavel, he founded the instant messenger service Telegram and developed the MTProto protocol for Telegram in 2013.
- Durov is believed to be the author of the original TON (Telegram Open Network) whitepaper.
