= Udokan Copper =

Russian copper mining company

- Company type: Private
- Industry: copper mining
- Founded: 2008
- Key people: Alisher Usmanov, Valery Kazikaev, Alexey Yashchuk
- Website: https://udokancopper.ru/en

Udokan Copper (Russian: Удоканская медь) is a Russian private mining and metallurgical company established in 2008 to develop the Udokan copper deposit located in the Udokan Range in Zabaikalsky Krai of Russia's Far East. The company is part of the USM Group. Its major beneficiary is Alisher Usmanov.

As of 2021, Udokan Copper holds over 26 million tonnes of copper.

Udokan is the largest untapped copper deposit in Russia and is ranked the third largest in the world.

== History ==
According to the JORC Code (Joint Ore Reserves Committee), the resources of the Udokan deposit are about 26.7 million tons of copper.

In 2008, the Mikhailovsky GOK, which is part of the USM Holdings' Metalloinvest, got a licence to develop the Udokan mine. Later, the license was reissued for a separate Baikal Mining Company, which was created the same year. In 2009, the Bateman engineering company made a preliminary feasibility study for the Udokan project. In 2010, more than 13 thousand meters of wells were drilled, a core storage facility was built, a three-dimensional model of the field was created, and an assessment of the project's environmental and social impact in the Kalarsky district began.

In 2011, the Baikal Mining Company bought out the Udokan pilot production unit, built in 2003 by the National University of Science and Technology (MISiS), to test the technology for producing copper from Udokan ore. In September 2018, the Federal Agency for Mineral Resources (Rosnedra) approved the technical project for the development of the Udokan mine. In December 2018, all the design and engineering documents for Udokan got state expert appraisal and the construction of the Udokan mining and metallurgical plant (MMP) Stage-1 was launched in 2019.

In January 2019, the design documentation for the reconstruction of the airport in the village of Chara near the Udokan mine was developed by the company and handed over to the regional authorities. In 2020, Udokan Copper initiated a comprehensive infrastructure renovation at the village of Novaya Chara.

On July 10, 2019, Gazprombank, VEB.RF and Sberbank of Russia signed a syndicated loan agreement with the Baikal Mining Company for the development of the Udokan mine amounting to $1.79 billion.

On December 30, 2020, the Baikal Mining Company was renamed Udokan Copper.

In May 2021, the company started working on a climate program that will help to estimate its greenhouse gas emissions of all scopes (Scope 1, 2 and 3) and identify the opportunities to reduce them.

In June 2021, during the St. Petersburg International Economic Forum, Gazprombank, VEB.RF and Sberbank, together with Udokan Copper, signed an agreement on the financing of the Udokan MMP Stage-2 with investments assessed at about $4 billion. In 2021, during the coronavirus pandemic, Udokan Copper financed the construction of a separate hospital module for infectious diseases at the Municipal Hospital in the Kalarsky district.

== Location ==
Udokan mine is located 30 km from the Baikal-Amur Mainline which makes the markets of China, Korea and Japan easily reachable for the company.

== Impact ==
In September 2018, the Baikal Mining Company, the Government of Zabaykalsky Krai and the local Association of Indigenous Peoples signed a cooperation agreement. The company supports activities that contribute to the preservation of the traditional lifestyle and culture of evenks – an indigenous people of the Kalarsky district.

In January 2019, the design documentation for the reconstruction of the airport in the village of Chara near the Udokan mine was developed by the company and handed over to the regional authorities.

In 2020, Udokan Copper initiated a comprehensive infrastructure renovation at the village of Novaya Chara. The project includes the construction of new cultural, sports and medical centers, as well as new housing and the village’s central streets landscaping.

In May 2021, the company started working on a climate program that will help to estimate its greenhouse gas emissions of all scopes (Scope 1, 2 and 3) and identify the opportunities to reduce them.
