= My World@Mail.Ru =

Social network

- Website type: Social media
- Available in: Russian
- Owner: VK Company Limited
- Website: my.mail.ru
- Registration: Required
- Launched: May 2007; 19 years ago

My World@Mail.Ru (Russian: Мой мир@Mail.Ru) is a social networking service which is a part of Mail.ru portal.

My World is the third most popular Russian social networking site, after VK.com and Odnoklassniki. All three networks belong to VK Group.

== History ==
Beta testing of My World began in May, 2007. Initially the site was intended for creating one interface for other Mail.ru portal services (initially – Blogi@Mail.ru, Video@Mail.ru, Photo@Mail.Ru and Otveti@Mail.ru). Service’s release from beta was announced by CEO of Mail.ru Dmitry Grishin via personal messages to the users of the social networking site. After the release My World introduced search of classmates, course mates, colleagues and soul mates by filling relevant fields in a user profile.

In 2007, the social networking site introduced mobile version, in 2008 instant messaging and music playback was presented.

In 2010 My World released microblogs and in 2011 the social networking site added a "like" button and commenting functionality for other user’s news.

My World's design was cardinally revised in 2012.

In 2015 My World changed its positioning: instead of mates search portal, the social networking service acquired a new image as a service that provides communication for people with similar interests. The social networking site revised three main content columns: music, video and games. In 2015 the site re-launched its music service.

== Functionality ==
My World unites blogging service and video/photo storage functionality. Instant messaging service is provided by web version of Mail.Ru Agent.

=== Integration with other Mail.Ru services ===
Data of My World is used by other services of Mail.ru. In 2008 users of the social networking site received a new function: creating job CVs in Rabota@Mail.Ru site via utilizing filled profile of My World. Go@Mail.Ru suggests My World user accounts while providing search results. Up to 2010 search engine results included only the profiles of Mail.ru social networking service. Later the service was disabled, and in 2013 profiles of other popular services were added to search results. Since 2011, activity of social networking site user influences his personified search results.

After acquisition of Odnoklassniki by Mail.Ru Group, both services profiles can be linked.

=== Video ===
First application with legal video content in My World was Videolyubitel that was launches in 2010 and operated with legal video library of Video.ru portal. Soon after, portal ivi.ru introduced its own My World application with access to online cinema collection while channel STS launched its own social networking app with series collection.

In 2014, Mail.ru organized My World-based online cinema with movies available for a certain amount of time. In order to realize this project the company received settlements from copyright owners. Moreover, the social networking site launched theme channels that unified archived series or music videos.

=== Applications ===
After releasing API for third party developers in 2010, My World focused on the growth of its app (especially games). Statistics of that same year showed that around 40% of social networking service users play video games. In 2012, the number of game installations to users’ pages reached 280 millions. Games remain the main source of income for My World.

If social network site teams consider a game promising, developers can count for ad support. Moreover, Mail.ru does not require commission from in-game purchases. As a means of payment on the social networking site, Money@Mail.Ru is utilized.

My World applications include not only games. For example, antivirus developer Agnitum used a social networking app for managing subscriptions to its SaaS-service for PC.

=== Mobile version ===
According to Mail.ru Group, by the December, 2013 22% of users used mobile devices as a means of My World usage. The social networking service is available via mobile site version, iOS and Android applications.

My World client is pre-installed to majority of LG Android-based smartphones intended for Russian market (including LG GT540 Optimus and LG Optimus One).

== Audience ==
According to TNS, monthly audience of the social networking service in November 2014 reached 25.2 million. According to polls published by Levada-Center in 2013, My World was used by 21% of Moscow residents and 12% of regions' residents. My World was noted as the only social networking service with the number of female users exceeding male users.

Research of SuperJob.ru recruiting portal in 2011 showed that the most active users of My World are nurses, public officers and accountants while core audience consists of over-40 users.
