= Igor Linshits =

Georgian-British entrepreneur

- Born: December 18, 1963 (age 62); Georgia (country), USSR
- Citizenship: British (since 2009)
- Education: Lomonosov Institute of Fine Chemical Technology
- Occupations: Entrepreneur, businessman
- Children: 3

Igor Linshits is a Georgian-born, London-based entrepreneur, founder of Delin Capital, Delin Property, and Delin Ventures.

== Career in Russia ==
In 1988, Linshits established his first business manufacturing hairbrushes and combs. In 1990, he and his partners started a business in trading and processing oil products that quickly grew into one of the largest businesses of its kind in Russia. In 1993, he spun off from his partners to establish his own business, Neftyanoi. Neftyanoi initially focused on trading commodities, especially oil products such as wheat and cotton, before moving into direct investments. Its most prominent deals involved Lukoil-Neftekhim and mail.ru.

In the late 1990s, Linshits invested in a petrochemical plant. Then, in partnership with Lukoil, he established Lukoil-Neftekhim, previously known in English as Lukoil Chemical. Linshits sold his shares to Lukoil in 2000. Also in 2000, in cooperation with Yuri Milner, he bought a 10% stake in mail.ru, then a largely unknown Russian internet portal. Over the next few years, he increased his ownership stake to more than 30%. Together with Milner, Linshits took an active role in the development of mail.ru, now Russia's second largest internet company by revenue.

While in Moscow, Linshits developed a number of real estate projects. The largest was Silver City; a 60,000 square meter, class A office building located in the centre of Moscow.

== Career in the United Kingdom ==
In 2009, Linshits immigrated to the U.K., where he became a citizen and founded Delin Capital, a private investment company that includes Delin Property and Delin Ventures.

Linshits established Delin Property to capitalize on ecommerce's impact on commercial real estate. Today Delin Property is a leading pan-European investor, developer, and manager of logistics real estate. In 2017, Delin Property concluded a partnership with Blackstone to acquire prime logistics assets in Germany, Benelux, and the U.K. Linshits currently serves as Chairman of the Investment Committee at Delin Property.

Linshits established Delin Ventures as a follow-up to his success with mail.ru. Delin Ventures, an early-stage life sciences and technology investor, supports emerging venture fund managers as well as making direct investments in early-stage companies. At present, Linshits serves as a member of the Investment Committee at Delin Ventures. In 2018, Linshits became the Chairman of the Investment Committee for Stride.VC, a venture capital firm targeting seed-stage startups, founded by Fred Destin and Harry Stebbings.

== Personal life ==
In 2004, Linshits appointed his close friend Boris Nemtsov, a well-known and outspoken member of the Russian opposition, as the Chairman of Neftyanoi. Nemtsov was assassinated in 2015 by unknown parties. Subsequent to Nemtsov's appointment, the Russian authorities accused Linshits and a number of employees of a subsidiary of banking regulation violations. In 2006, Linshits chose to emigrate from Russia. All charges against him were dropped in 2010.
