= Alisher Usmanov =

Uzbek-Russian businessman and investor (born 1953)

- Алишер Усманов
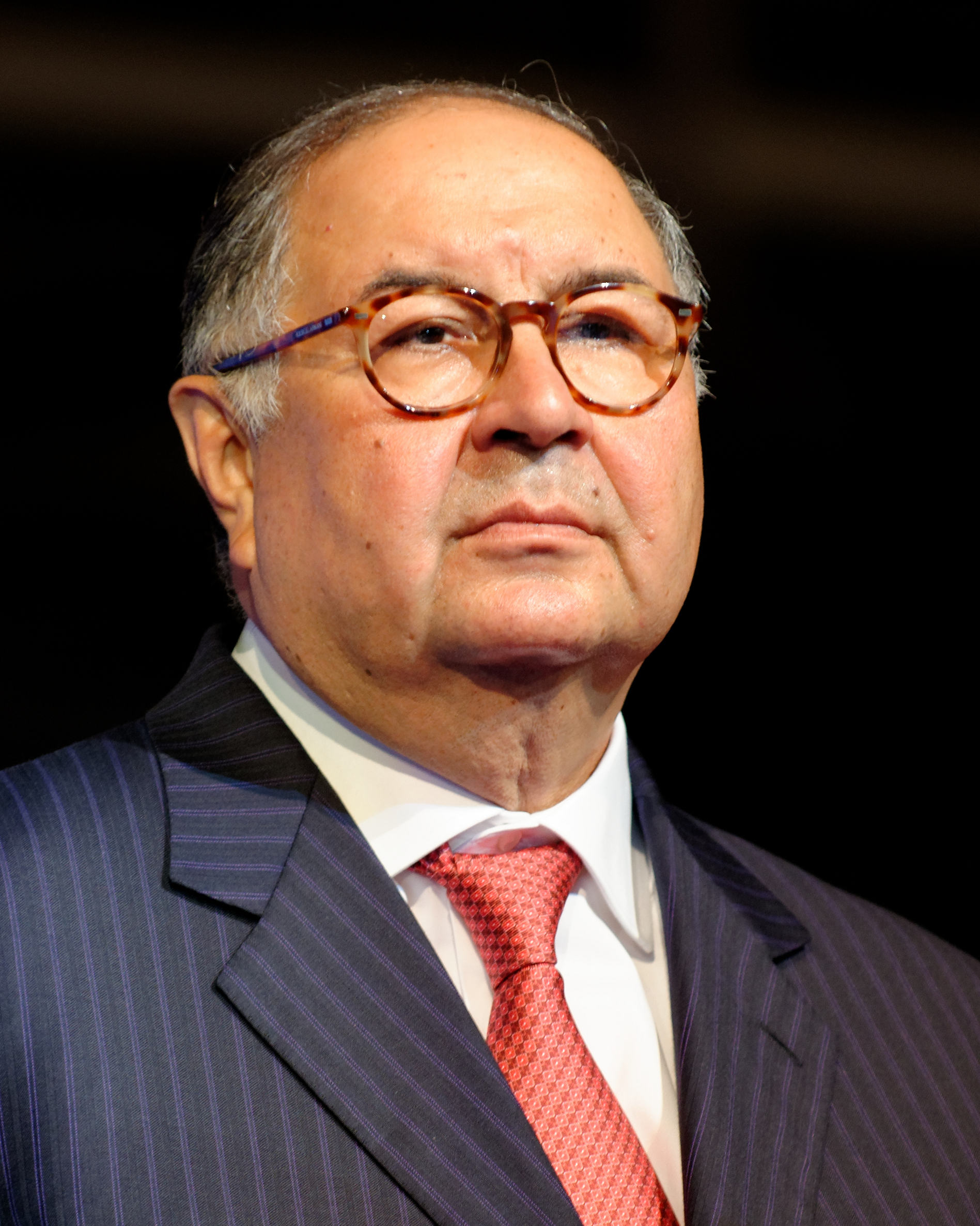
- Usmanov in 2013
- Born: 9 September 1953 (age 73); Chust, Uzbek SSR, Soviet Union
- Education: Moscow Institute of International Relations
- Known for: Shareholder of USM Holdings (49%); President of Fédération Internationale d'Escrime
- Spouse(s): Irina Viner (m. 1992; div. 2022)
- Awards: Order "For Merit to the Fatherland" (4th class); Order of Alexander Nevsky; Order of Honour; Order of Friendship (Kazakhstan); Order of Public Esteem (Uzbekistan)

Alisher Burkhanovich Usmanov (Uzbek: Alisher Burxonovich Usmonov, Russian: Алишер Бурханович Усманов; born 9 September 1953) is a Russian-Uzbek businessman. As of 2026, Usmanov is the 222nd richest person in the world according to Forbes, with a net worth of $14.1 billion, largely due to his stake in USM Holdings, in which Usmanov holds less than 50%.

Usmanov was a successful entrepreneur in the Soviet Union in the 1980s but made substantial wealth after the collapse of the Soviet Union primarily through investments in metal and mining operations as well as large early investments in technology companies such as Facebook, Twitter, VK, and Alibaba Group.

In addition to his stake in Metalloinvest, he owns the Kommersant publishing house, is a co-owner of MegaFon, a mobile telephone operator, and co-owner of the Udokan mine, which develops one of the largest copper deposits in the world.

He has been the president of the Fédération Internationale d'Escrime, the international governing body of the sport of fencing, since 2008. Amid international sanctions, Usmanov temporarily suspended his duties as the FIE President in 2022 and 2024 after his re-election.

From 1980 to 1986 he spent six years in a Soviet prison on charges of fraud and embezzlement, but his conviction was later overturned. In 2000, he underwent political rehabilitation by the Supreme Court of Uzbekistan, which ruled that the case against him was fabricated and no crime had been committed.

Usmanov has been described as having close ties to President of Russia Vladimir Putin, which he denies, and, as a result, he has been sanctioned by the US, UK, and Ukrainian governments since the Russian invasion of Ukraine. On September 22, 2026, the European Union removed Alisher Usmanov from its sanctions list.

== Early life ==
Usmanov was born in Uzbekistan in the provincial town of Chust. He spent his childhood in the capital Tashkent, where his father was a state prosecutor, thus providing for a privileged life, and his mother, Dilbar taught Russian language.

Planning to pursue a career of a diplomat, he later moved to Moscow. After first failing to be accepted, one year later he was accepted to the Moscow State Institute of International Relations, from which he graduated in 1976 with a degree in international law.

Usmanov then returned to Tashkent, where he was appointed director of the Foreign Economic Association of the Soviet Peace Committee.

Usmanov was arrested and convicted on charges of fraud, corruption, and theft of state property, which charges included shaking down an Army officer, in Uzbek SSR in August 1980. From 1980, when he was 26 years old, until 1986, when he was 33 years old, he was imprisoned in a remote Uzbek prison for six years of an eight-year sentence. In July 2000, his conviction was vacated, nine years after the dissolution of the Soviet Union, by the Supreme Court of Uzbekistan, which ruled that "the original conviction was unjust, no crime was ever committed, and that the evidence was fabricated." His version of events has been questioned by Craig Murray, the British Ambassador to Uzbekistan from 2002 to 2004. Years later, Usmanov's public relations firm tried to delete reference to his conviction and imprisonment from Wikipedia.

== Business career ==
=== Early years ===
Usmanov became a dollar millionaire in the years before the Soviet Union collapsed. In the late 1980s, he set up a privately owned for-profit company, cooperative Agroplast which produced plastic bags, at a time when they were very scarce. He enriched himself considerably after the collapse of the USSR, but always stressed that he never participated in the privatization of state property.

Usmanov worked as the Deputy General Director of Intercross JSC from 1990 to 1994, and from 1994 to 1998, he headed Interfin Interbank Investment and Finance Company. He also acted as an Adviser to the General Director of Moscow Aviation Industrial Enterprise from 1994 to 1995, and served as the First Deputy Chairman of MAPO-Bank from 1995 to 1997. From August 1997 to February 2000 he was First Deputy General Director of Gazprom Vestholding LLC. From November 2000 to July 2001, he served as advisor to the chairman of the board of Gazprom. From February 2000 to October 2014, he served as general director of Gazprom Vestholding LLC, a subsidiary of Gazprom that focused on managing non-core assets. In this position, Usmanov had Gazprom acquire Severneftegazprom, which owns the largest South Russian field, controlling stakes in Zapsibgazprom and Sibur, as well as over 50% of Stroytransgaz. Usmanov left the company in 2014.

=== USM Holdings and Metalloinvest ===
In 1999, Usmanov co-founded Metalloinvest with Vasily Anisimov to make acquisitions in the metal industry. Unlike Russia's tycoons who won control of empires through loans-for-share privatization schemes of the 1990s, Usmanov built up Metalloinvest through a series of acquisitions in the secondary market. Metalloinvest owns a wide range of Russian metal and mining businesses including Lebedinsky GOK and Mikhailovsky GOK; Oskol Elektrometallurgical Plant and Ural Steel steel mills and a ferrous scrap enterprise – Ural Scrap Company.

In March 2022, Metalloinvest sold the Ural Steel to Zagorsk Pipe Plant.

Usmanov holds a non-controlling stake less than 50% in USM, a global conglomerate with its main investments in metals and mining industry, telecommunications and technology.

In 2004, Usmanov acquired 13% of Corus Group (later Tata Steel Europe), borrowing $49.5 million from Sevenkey, a trust for the benefit of Igor Shuvalov, the top assistant to Vladimir Putin; funds were provided by Eugene Shvidler. Despite Usmanov's ability to borrow at low rates, Sevenkey received over a 40% annualized return for this investment, in 2006, it received 4.9% of Gallagher's investment income.

Between 2006 and 2008, Usmanov acquired stakes in Australia-based mining companies: Strike Resources (iron ore deposit in Peru), Medusa, Mt Gibson and Aztec Resources through Gallagher Holdings. In 2013, it was remained USM Holdings after a merger with assets from Andrei Skoch and Farhad Moshiri.

In 2009, Metalloinvest Holding sold its 10.37% stake in Australian gold producer Medusa Mining for A$56 million.

As of 2009, Metalloinvest was the second largest shareholder, after Mohammed Al Bawani (MB Holding), in Nautilus Minerals. These two shareholders took control of the company after its filed for bankruptcy in 2019.

In November 2015, USM invested US$100 million in competitive video game esports team Virtus Pro.

In 2021, USM and Metalloinvest announced plans to construct one of the world's largest Hot-briquetted iron eco-plants in Kursk Oblast to supply greener products used to make steel amid a growing focus to clean up the industry.

=== Udokan Copper ===
In 2008, Metalloinvest bought the Udokan licence for $500mn, which was discovered in Soviet times and proved to be one of the world's largest copper deposit. Geologists estimate there are 26.7mn tonnes of copper ore under the JORC classification.

In 2020, Baikal Mining Company (rebranded to Udokan copper) began strip mining at the Udokan mine, which had been untouched since 1949 due to the site's remoteness and extreme weather conditions. The development of Udokan includes the construction of the first stage of a mining and metallurgical plant for the production of cathode copper and copper concentrate, as well as the production of up to 125,000 tpy of copper in addition to 12mn tonnes of ore.

=== Mail.Ru Group / VK ===
In 2008, Usmanov became acquainted with Yuri Milner, and soon became a shareholder of DST Global and VK (VK).

Usmanov had 25.3% of interest in VK, and 60.6% of voting interest until he sold a $530 million stake and reduced his interests to 17.9 and 58.1% in 2013.

In 2014, Ivan Tavrin acquired Pavel Durov's shares in Vk.ru, to help (together with Usmanov) Durov retain control under the Telegram app when UCP attempted to take control of Telegram.

In December 2021, USM Holdings sold its interest in VK to Russian insurance company Sogaz and Gazprombank, thereby fully exiting its shareholding in VK.

=== MegaFon ===
In April 2012, companies affiliated with Alisher Usmanov acquired a majority interest in mobile telephone operator MegaFon. Currently Usmanov holds 49% of USM Holdings, which owns MegaFon shares.

=== Other investments ===
In 2009, Mark Zuckerberg solicited investments in Facebook from Russian investors at a meeting brokered by Goldman Sachs. Usmanov made his first investment to Facebook in 2009 by Mail.ru, investing $200 million for a 1.96% stake that valued Facebook at $10 billion. He accepted Zuckerberg's conditions and did not receive voting rights on those shares. Usmanov netted $1.4 billion from the sale of those shares in 2013.

In 2011, DST Global made a $400 million investment in Twitter for 5% of the company. The investment was sold in 2014.

Through Mail.Ru Group, Usmanov made notable investments in other international technology companies, including Groupon, Zynga, Airbnb, Zocdoc, Xiaomi, Alibaba Group and JD.com.

In 2013, Usmanov invested $100 million in Apple. He disposed of his shares in early 2014.

In September 2018, Mail.ru entered into a $2 billion joint venture with Alibaba to merge the online marketplaces of both companies in the Russian market and was backed by the Kremlin via the Russian Direct Investment Fund.

=== Kommersant and media firms ===
In August 2006, Usmanov began to invest in media. He bought Kommersant, a newspaper formerly owned by Russian oligarch Boris Berezovsky, for US$200 million. Usmanov also made a $25 million purchase of a 50% stake in Russian sports TV channel 7TV in November 2006 and bought 75% of Russian TV music channel Muz-TV for $300 million in June 2007. A stake was sold to Walt Disney Company in 2011 for $300 million.

He sold his TV assets to his business-partner Ivan Tavrin in 2017.

=== Retirement ===
In 2012, Usmanov announced plans to retire once he reached the “age of the prophet” (63 years old). In 2014, his retirement was implemented as he stepped down from active management positions, as well as shifted focus to philanthropic activities, including promoting the development of Uzbekistan, and sports. In 2023, he also resigned from the board of the Russian Union of Industrialists and Entrepreneurs.

In 2020, Usmanov said in an interview with the Financial Times that he will leave his assets to his family and USM management: "Many people have helped me. So I want to help my family and my management by giving them my shares. Fifty per cent to family, fifty per cent to management, who deserve this, in my view".

== Sport-related activities ==
=== Arsenal F.C. ===
Usmanov was a shareholder of the English football team Arsenal from 2007 to 2018. He moved into the football arena in August 2007 by acquiring a 14.58% stake in Arsenal. He and his business partner Farhad Moshiri bought the stake in the club owned by former Arsenal vice-chairman David Dein for £75 million. Dein was appointed head of their investment vehicle, Red and White Holdings, which became the largest shareholder in the club outside of members of the board of directors.

On 28 September 2007, Red and White Holdings increased its shareholding to 23%, making it the second-largest shareholder in the club behind Arsenal non-executive director Danny Fiszman. On 15 February 2008, he increased it to over 24%, just short of Fiszman's 24.11%. He increased it to 25% on 16 February 2009. Red and White Holdings confirmed that it was the club's largest shareholder, and the company said it "has the necessary funding to increase its stake further [but] it has no current intention to make a full takeover bid for Arsenal for six months." If the stake were to reach 30%, Red and White Holdings would have to launch a formal takeover.

Usmanov's interest precipitated a "lock-down" agreement by the Gunners' board, whereby chairman Peter Hill-Wood announced that club directors could sell their stakes only to "permitted persons" before April 2009, and had to give fellow board members "first option" on shares until October 2012.

American businessman Stan Kroenke, already a major Arsenal shareholder, increased his stake in the club to just over 62% in April 2011 after buying out Fiszman and Lady Bracewell-Smith, making him the majority shareholder. As Kroenke's stake had risen above 30%, he was obliged to make an offer to buy out the remainder of Arsenal shares. Usmanov refused to sell, however, and maintained his stake.

Usmanov increased his Arsenal share beyond 29% in June 2011. He then purchased shares held by Scottish football club Rangers in February 2012. As of October 2013, he owned over 30% of the club. Usmanov criticized Arsenal's lack of ambition and financial model in an open letter sent to the board on 5 July 2012. He asserted that he had no intention of selling his shares.

In August 2018, Usmanov accepted a bid of for £550 million for his shares at Arsenal. He sold his stake in 2018 to Stan Kroenke.

=== Everton F.C. ===
In January 2017 USM, entered a five-year, $15 million+ deal with Everton F.C. for the naming rights of the club's training ground, Finch Farm. Usmanov's partner in USM holdings is Farhad Moshiri, the former majority shareholder of Everton and former shareholder of Arsenal through Red and White holdings. In 2019 MegaFon became the sleeve sponsor for the men's training wear of Everton and its official matchday presenting partner. In 2020 MegaFon expanded their commercial agreement with Everton to become the main sponsor of the women's team. Companies with Usmanov's interest continued to provide funding for the club despite the fact that he was barred from entering the UK in 2021.

In March 2022, Everton suspended its sponsorship ties with USM and MegaFon due to the Russian invasion of Ukraine.

=== International Fencing Federation (FIE) ===
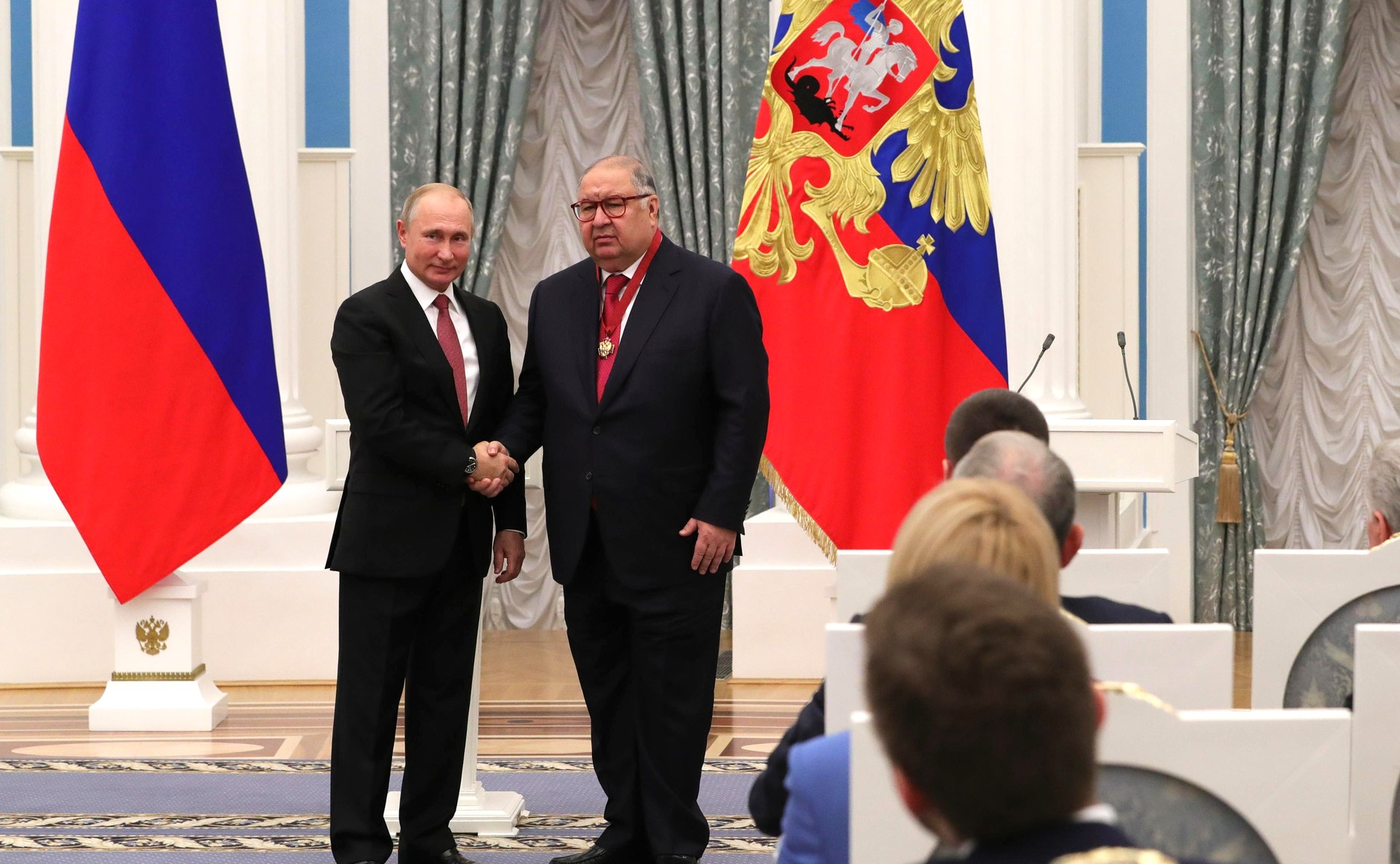
Alisher Usmanov with Vladimir Putin.

A former sabre fencer for the former Uzbek Soviet Socialist Republic, Usmanov supported the promotion of fencing through his charity fund "For the Future of Fencing", created in 2004. According to media estimates, Usmanov's total donations to the FIE during his tenure as President amount to approximately $100 million.

He was president of the Russian Fencing Federation from 2001 to 2009. He was concurrently president of the European Fencing Confederation from 2005 to 2009.

==== Election and Activities of Alisher Usmanov in FIE ====
He was elected president of the International Fencing Federation (FIE) in 2008 with 66 votes to 61 for incumbent president René Roch. He was re-elected in 2012 and 2016. In 2021, Usmanov was re-elected by acclamation to a fourth term. In November 2024, at the congress in Tashkent, Usmanov received 120 votes “for” out of the possible 156, beating his opponent, the president of the Swedish Fencing Federation, Otto Drakenberg.

==== FIE Development and Reforms ====
During Usmanov’s presidency, the FIE implemented measures to reform management, develop international fencing, introduce modern technologies and expand the Olympic program. During this period, the Federation's financial resources increased, while several administrative and technological changes were introduced to support the development of fencing..

Since 2008, the FIE has not been involved in major doping scandals, which is attributed to tightened controls and cooperation with WADA . The Federation’s budget has grown from $5 million in 2007 to more than $20 million a year by 2020. E-voting, uniform audit standards and transparent budgeting were embedded into the management structure. The number of national federations — members of the FIE has reached 156, covering all continents.

==== Olympic Games and TV Broadcasts ====
At the Olympic Games in Tokyo, 12 sets of medals in fencing were awarded for the first time (6 in individual and 6 in team events), whereas previously 10 sets were awarded at the Olympics. The changes to the medal count were agreed with the IOC following years of discussions. The main motive for the International Olympic Committee’s decision was the appearance of fencing in regular television broadcasts. The FIE concluded agreements with TV channels such as NBC and Eurosport.

==== Technological Innovations and Rule Changes ====
At the 2018 FIE congress in Paris, Alisher Usmanov announced that the World Fencing21 Championships in China were the first to use LED platforms displaying the score and names of athletes, and showing informational and entertaining videos. Key changes also included adjusting the rules to boost dynamics and eliminating wired systems, giving athletes greater freedom of movement.

In July 2020, the FIE presented a 1 million franc support plan, which included the cancellation of membership fees and the provision of grants to national federations, organisers, athletes and judges. During that period, offline tournaments were also held in Doha, Budapest and Kazan, with sanitary measures in place.

Usmanov initiated the creation of charitable foundations, the Fencing Veterans Support Endowment and “For the Future of Fencing”. Their activities are aimed at supporting athletes, Paralympic fencing, and providing social assistance to athletes with disabilities.

The “Donate your fencing gear!” program distributes donated fencing equipment.

==== Suspension of duties ====
In February 2022, following Usmanov's inclusion on the European Union sanctions list, he temporarily stepped down as FIE President to eliminate reputational and legal risks for the organisation. Emmanuel Katsiadakis became the Interim President. After being re-elected as head of the Federation in November 2024 in Tashkent, Usmanov again suspended his duties. Since April 30, 2025, Abdel Monem El-Husseini, former President of the Egyptian Fencing Federation, has been the Interim President of the FIE.

=== Other ===
In February 2008, Metalloinvest became sponsor of FC Dynamo Moscow, a football team in Russia's capital. Metalloinvest group's name replaced the Xerox Corporation's on its players' shirts as part of the $7 million deal.

Usmanov was a member of the Councils of the 2014 Sochi XXII Olympic Winter Games and XI Paralympic Winter Games. He is also a member of the Board of Trustees of the Russian Olympic Athletes' Support Fund.

== Controversies ==
=== Legal suppression of Craig Murray's accusations ===
On 2 September 2007, former British Ambassador to Uzbekistan Craig Murray claimed that Usmanov "was in no sense a political prisoner, but a gangster and racketeer who rightly did six years in jail" and his pardon was the work of Uzbekistan President Islam Karimov on the instructions of Uzbekistani power broker and alleged drug trafficker Gafur Rakhimov and that Usmanov paid a bribe of $88 million to the daughter of Karimov, Gulnara Karimova. Murray also stated that "Usmanov is also dogged by the widespread belief in Uzbekistan that he was guilty of a particularly atrocious rape, which was covered up and the victim and others in the know disappeared". Murray also implicated Usmanov in the death of a journalist.

In December 2007, The Mail on Sunday re-published the allegations. Usmanov, represented by Schillings, threatened libel and The Mail on Sunday apologized for publishing the accusations. The article was subsequently removed by Murray's web host, allegedly under pressure from Schillings. Schillings warned owners of independent blogs and websites to remove any references to Murray's allegations, and any reproduction of Murray's blog post.

Indymedia was issued with a take-down notice, on 10 September 2007 and again on 21 September. Unrelated political blogs that were hosted on the same server, such as one by Boris Johnson and Bloggerheads.com suffered from downtime.

=== Censorship in Kommersant of criticism of Putin ===
On 12 December 2011, following the 2011 Russian protests regarding vote-rigging in parliamentary elections, Kommersant Vlast magazine ran an unflattering issue on Vladimir Putin titled "Victory of United ballot-stuffers" – a pun on Putin's United Russia party. Usmanov fired the editor, Maxim Kovalsky, and the head of the publisher's holding company, Andrei Galiyev, saying there had been an "ethical breach" and that the issue "bordered on petty hooliganism". The controversy surrounded an image of a ballot paper from the parliamentary vote with the words "Putin, go fuck yourself" scrawled in red ink. The caption read: "A correctly filled out ballot recognized as invalid." Demyan Kudryavtsev, the head of the Kommersant publishing house, assumed responsibility by resigning, stating in a blog post that the magazine issue had been "in violation of internal procedures, professional journalistic standards and the Russian law".

Nadezhda Azhgihina, executive secretary of the Russian Union of Journalists, was shocked by the incident, calling it "a clear example of censorship from the owner". On 14 December 2011, 60 journalists from the Kommersant newspaper signed an open letter to Usmanov, saying, "We are being compelled to be cowards, which is unworthy and unproductive...We regard [Kovalsky's] dismissal as an act of intimidation aimed at preventing any critical words about Vladimir Putin...We take particular offense at the attempt to present the dismissal of a man for his professional position as a fight for the purity of the Russian language. This is the same kind of fabrication that offended people at the election." Usmanov responded that emotionally, he could "understand the journalists speaking up for sacked top managers" but that "Kommersant Vlast is a respectable, independent, socio-political publication." Mikhail Prokhorov, who had announced his candidacy for the 2012 presidential election, offered to buy Kommersant on the same day, but Usmanov rejected the offer. In 2013, Kovalsky returned to Kommersant, where he worked until his death from cancer in 2019.

=== Sanctions on Kommersant ===
Notwithstanding the imposition of sanctions on Alisher Usmanov by the U.S. Department of Treasury and, therefore, the fact that Kommersant is owned by the SDN, OFAC issued General License No. 64 to authorize any transactions "ordinarily incident and necessary to the operations of the newspaper Kommersant". U.S. officials consider the newspaper as of one of the last independent media outlets in Russia. Despite the official exemption from sanctions, Kommersant was still severely affected by the sanctions regime. Due to vague wording in the license regarding the range of permitted transactions, almost all of Kommersant's international partners chose to simply stop cooperating with the newspaper. As a result, Kommersant lost access to the basic tools used by all major media outlets, such as the Bloomberg Terminal, and was also disconnected from the Google Discover service, which accounted for almost 40% of daily clicks on links to Kommersant's website.

=== Editing of article on English Wikipedia ===
In 2012, Usmanov hired London-based public relations firm RLM Finsbury to edit Usmanov's article on English Wikipedia to remove information on Usmanov's criminal convictions and controversies. The discovery caused significant backlash among the PR professionals in the UK, with the CEO of the Chartered Institute of Public Relations stressing that "public relations professionals should not directly edit Wikipedia for a client or employer". The PR firm said it acted without the authorisation of Usmanov. The information was said to have been removed in expectation of the stock market listing of MegaFon, in which Usmanov indirectly holds a stake.

=== Corruption and bribery allegations ===
In 2018, US Senators Marco Rubio, Roger Wicker, Lindsey Graham, and Cory Gardner called on the Trump administration to sanction Usmanov alleged is his corruption and bribery of Russian government officials.

== Sanctions ==
In February 2022, in reaction to the Russian invasion of Ukraine, the European Union designated Usmanov, imposing an EU-wide travel ban on him and freezing all his assets. In March 2022, the United States imposed similar sanctions on him, with some exceptions for companies in which Usmanov directly or indirectly holds or held stakes. Also in March 2022, he was sanctioned by the British government.

In March 2024, Swedish economist and former government adviser Anders Åslund removed his post on X where he called the billionaire one of "Putin's favourite oligarchs", at the request of Usmanov's lawyers. This post was used by the Council in its justification for sanctions. Usmanov denied these allegations and filed an appeal in the General Court of the EU in an attempt to lift the sanctions. On 7 February 2024, the appeal was dismissed. However, the EU Council dropped the term "oligarch" from Usmanov's sanctions reasoning. It now reads "a leading businessperson".

According to the Index, Usmanov's net worth fell by nearly 25% from February 22 to March 15, 2022, due to sanctions following the Russian invasion of Ukraine.

Usmanov was named in the Official Journal of the European Union, the publication of record of the EU, as a “leading businessperson having interests in iron ore and steel, media, telecommunications and internet companies” It added: "[Usmanov] has been referred to as one of Vladimir Putin's favourite leading businesspersons. He is considered to be one of Russia's businesspersons-officials, who were entrusted with servicing financial flows but whose positions depend on the will of the President." Usmanov claimed that the reasons employed to justify the sanctions were a set of false and defamatory allegations. He filed a lawsuit against the Council in the EU court in order to prove the invalidity of the accusations of the Council and lift the sanctions. Usmanov claims his fame and fortune rather than links to President Vladimir Putin made him a target for sanctions. His lawyers told an EU court hearing he was unfairly targeted as "prey" by officials because he was a "visible symbol" known to the public. In August 2025, German lawyer Joachim Steinhöfel, who represents the interests of Alisher Usmanov, filed a lawsuit against the EU Council, accusing it of defamation due to the introduction of European sanctions based on unfounded allegations by journalists On 3 September 2025, EU General Court dismissed Usmanov's de-listing application, however noting that Usmanov's stake in USM is “non-controlling”.

Usmanov also sued Forbes for an article containing allegations that formed the basis of sanctions. His lawyers successfully proved that the publication's allegations were defamatory and unfounded.

On January 23, 2026, the Hamburg Regional Court ruled in favor of Alisher Usmanov in his lawsuit against the Frankfurter Allgemeine Zeitung. The court prohibited the newspapers from publishing certain allegations that were deemed false. This marks the first time a European court has banned the dissemination of statements by Alexei Navalny concerning Usmanov including allegations that he had "donated" properties to entities associated with Deputy Chairman of the Russian Security Council Dmitry Medvedev as "a return favour for Medvedev covering up Usmanov's deals to the detriment of the interests of Gazprom" and that, in 2002, Usmanov had acquired shares in Gazprom Investholding through his controlled company, thus effectively "selling state-owned assets to himself." Among the prohibited content are also the allegations that Usmanov had used his fortune in the interests or at the direction of the Kremlin, that he informally represented Russian authorities in Uzbekistan, and interfered with the editorial policy of Kommersant newspaper after acquiring it in 2006.

=== Proceedings in Germany due to sanctions ===
In March 2022, the Cabinet of Germany set up a task force to enforce EU sanctions in Germany, including tracking down funds and assets involving the Ministry of Economics and Finance, the financial supervisory authority BaFin, the Federal Criminal Police Office, customs and the Federal Intelligence Service (BND).

The German Federal Criminal Police Office came across 36 offshore companies and 90 suspicious money laundering reports in connection with Usmanov. Usmanov denied all accusations, arguing that under the agreement on avoidance of double taxation between Russia and Germany, he did not have to pay taxes in Germany because all taxes were paid in Russia which has been successfully refuted by Usmanov's representatives in numerous court proceedings.

Usmanov does not own any real estate in Germany; all the properties are kept in irrevocable family trusts long before the imposition of sanctions.

On May 12, 2023, in a victory for Usmanov, the Land Court in Frankfurt am Main invalidated and annulled search orders at properties that German prosecutors linked to Usmanov: villas on Lake Tegernsee, an apartment in the outskirts of Frankfurt and other properties in Germany, as well as the Dilbar yacht in the port of Bremen. The court declared the searches illegal, called the prosecutors' accusations of money laundering groundless, and found numerous formal violations. The judges said the rulings that prompted the searches “do not meet the minimum requirements the definition of the crime being investigated”. German media called the case "the investigators' disgrace”. Another search occurred in early October 2023. On October 26, 2023, the court considered the application of Usmanov's lawyers requesting to stop illegal retention of property seized during the searches and ordered to return it to its owners. Searches with the seizure of documents took place even in the office of the football club "Bavaria" and at the stadium "Allianz Arena". Soon the authorization for the search was withdrawn by the court, and all the documents were returned.

In June 2023, A. Usmanov submitted a complaint to the German Constitutional Court, alleging a violation of his fundamental rights as guaranteed by the Basic Law (Germany's Constitution) and the EU Charter of Fundamental Rights. He was seeking to declare that some provisions of the German Foreign Trade Act (that he allegedly violated) are unconstitutional. The provisions in question stipulate that sanctioned individuals must report their assets to the authorities themselves. This contradicts the constitutional privilege against self-incrimination. Usmanov also wants the searches on the Dilbar yacht to be recognized as a violation of the inviolability of the dwelling and an infringement of personal dignity.

Usmanov's sister, Gulbakhor Ismailova, was the beneficiary of the trust which owns the super-yacht Dilbar, before the EU imposed sanctions on her. In March 2024, Ismailova irrevocably and permanently waived all rights to benefit from family trusts. According to Politico, in March 2025, the EU removed Ismailova from its 2000-person sanctions list within the deal with Hungary, which had threatened to veto the whole sanctions framework. Another sister of Usmanov, Saodat Narzieva, was also on the EU sanctions list. But after investigations were published, proving that the data from "Suisse Secrets", according to which Narzieva was said to have been the beneficial owner of up to 27 accounts at the major Swiss bank Credit Suisse was false, on 14 September 2022, the EU lifted sanctions from her.

In October 2023, the German “Central Office for Sanctions Enforcement" (ZfS) of the Bundeszollverwaltung searched several properties in the greater Munich area and on Lake Tegernsee. According to dpa information, around 30 investigators searched the villa German prosecutors wrongly attributed to Usmanov and confiscated several luxury vehicles, assets and possessions. Meanwhile, his spokesman said that there can be no reasons for suspicion against Usmanov and that the properties are held in a trust, which Usmanov does not own and therefore he cannot control or manage its assets. Later, a German court confirmed that the allegations were false and banned the media from naming Usmanov as the owner of the villa.

In June 2024, Usmanov filed suit against UBS Europe SE in Frankfurt over what his lawyers said were unsubstantiated reports that triggered an illegal criminal probe into his business dealings. Usmanov said that the bank had violated its confidentiality agreements by sharing more than a dozen misleading reports dating from 2018 to 2022 with German police.

In November 2024 the Prosecutor General's Office in Frankfurt am Main has dropped its investigation into Usmanov. Usmanov voluntary donated 4 million euros split between charities and the state. The closure of the case does not constitute an admission of guilt. Usmanov's lawyers said that after more than two-and-a-half years, the investigation had failed to prove the accusations against him.

On May 5, 2025, the Regional Court of Hamburg ruled that the statement that Alisher Usmanov is the owner of the yacht Dilbar is false and prohibited its dissemination.

At the end of 2025, the Munich II Public Prosecutor's Office dropped the case against Usmanov in which it was investigating him on suspicion of two violations of the Foreign Trade Act and possible sanctions violations in exchange for a payment of €10 million. Usmanov agreed to the dismissal by paying the sum.

On November 2, 2026, the Federal Court of Justice of Germany (BGH) issued a landmark ruling declaring the refusal by the President of the Regional Court of Hamburg to arrange for the service of Alisher Usmanov’s statement of claim against the Council of the European Union to be unlawful.

=== Seizure of property in Ukraine ===
In December 2022, a Ukraine Court ordered the seizure of ₴ 2 billion (US$54 million) worth of USM assets, comprising 160,000 tonnes of Ukrainian iron ore. Metalloinvest, in a statement published on 28 December, denied the information, saying that the Ukrainian authorities arrested iron ore raw materials produced by Metalloinvest's enterprises in Russia and intended for its buyers abroad. These were goods blocked for the export shipment by the Ukrainian authorities back in February 2022. Metalloinvest also warned it would take legal action against Ukraine and any potential buyer if Kyiv confiscates the company's iron. On September 25, Ukraine's High Anti-Corruption Court upheld Ukraine's decision to confiscate the iron-ore assets. "The Court's decision is a flagrant example of the unlawful and unfounded "legalization" of the appropriation of private property, which had earlier been blocked and illegally held by Ukrainian law enforcement agencies in typical pirate fashion for a period of more than two years. We will make every effort to ensure that international courts make an appropriate assessment of the unlawful actions of Ukraine's executive and judicial authorities", USM stated.

=== Attempts and success to get EU sanctions lifted ===
In September 2022, Hungary demanded to lift EU sanctions from Usmanov. In November 2022, the Uzbek government lobbied the EU to lift sanctions on Usmanov, stating that the sanctions were restricting his ability to invest in his home nation.

Alisher Usmanov was freed from EU-sanctions in September 2026, after a chain of events, which are believed to be part of an informal deal between the French and Azerbaijani governments. French businessman Martin Ryan, who had been arrested in Azerbaijan in 2023 and subsequently convicted for espionage, was pardoned by Ilham Aliyev in September 2026 as part of the deal which freed Usmanov from EU-sanctions. The French government had aggressively campaigned since 14 September 2026 against other EU members to remove Usmanov from the list of sanctioned individuals by threatening to block a renewal of a EU sanctions list with some 2,600 individuals on it.

On November 4, following the EU’s lead, Switzerland lifted sanctions against Alisher Usmanov.

== Personal life ==
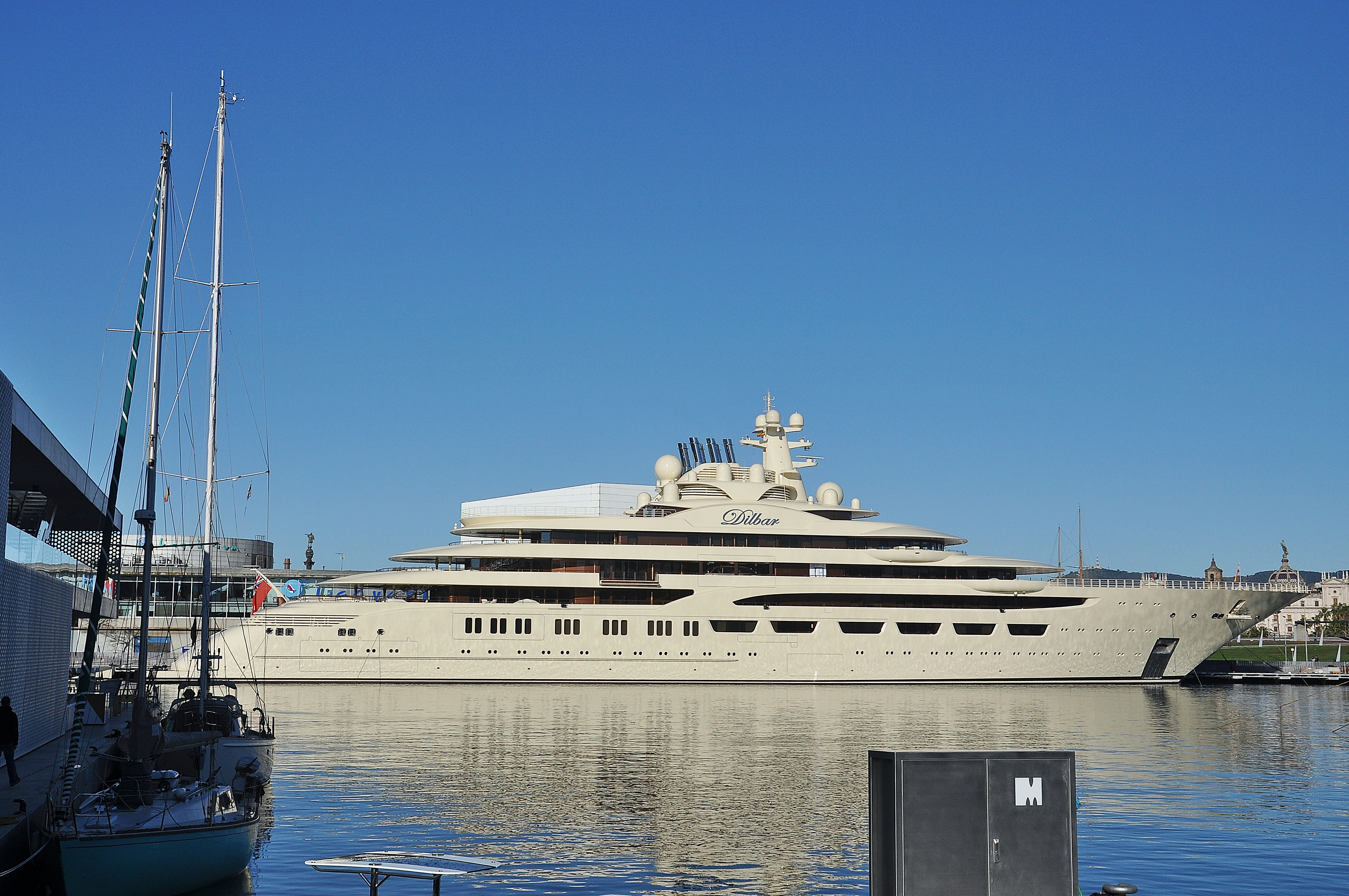
Yacht Dilbar in Barcelona

Usmanov is estimated to be among the world's 200 wealthiest individuals.

Usmanov, of Muslim heritage, married Jewish rhythmic gymnastics coach Irina Viner in 1992. Viner is considered to be close to Putin, having introduced him to former rhythmic gymnast Alina Kabaeva. On July 4, 2022, Usmanov and Viner divorced.

Usmanov has no biological children. He has a stepson, Anton Viner, with his former wife Irina Viner. The stepson is a real-estate investor, co-owner of Rodina development group.

Usmanov, who now lives in Tashkent, is related by marriage to President of Uzbekistan Shavkat Mirziyoyev and has been credited for helping him consolidate power.

=== Wealth ===
Usmanov is estimated to be among the world's 100 125 wealthiest individuals. In December 2012, Forbes ranked Usmanov 67th on its annual list of the World's Most Powerful People, and in September 2013, Bloomberg Markets included him in its "50 Most Influential" ranking under the Corporate Power Brokers category.

==== Trusts settled by Usmanov ====
In 2007 and 2016 Usmanov settled two trusts for the estate planning purposes. The spokesperson said Usmanov was not the owner of the trusts he founded and had no right to control or manage its assets.

The assets of the trust include:

• Grade I listed Tudor mansion Sutton Place set in 120 hectares (300 acres) in Surrey that by some estimates is worth £10 million;

• Beechwood House, a Grade II listed Regency property in 4.5 ha (11 acres) of grounds in the London suburb of Highgate that by some estimates is worth £48 million;

• Aircraft A340-313X named Bourkhan;

• Yacht Dilbar, the current largest yacht in the world by gross tonnage (15,917 gt) and the 6th largest yacht by length measuring 156.0 m (512 ft). It is reported to have cost $800 million, employ 84 full-time crew members, and contain the largest indoor swimming pool installed on a superyacht at 180 cubic metres.

In 2016, the German shipyard Lürssen built the Dilbar yacht. The yacht was included in the irrevocable discretionary trust The Sister Trust, which Alisher Usmanov established for estate planning. Since then, the yacht has been owned and controlled by an independent trustee of this trust.

In 2017, Alisher Usmanov left The Sister Trust. His sister, Gulbakhor Ismailova, remained the only beneficiary of the trust.

At the start of hostilities in Ukraine, the Dilbar yacht was undergoing maintenance at the Lürssen shipyard in Hamburg. On March 2, 2022, Forbes reported that German authorities allegedly "seized" Dilbar as a yacht belonging to Alisher Usmanov.

On April 8, 2022, the EU included Gulbakhor Ismailova in the sanctions list, citing an investigation by the Federal Criminal Police Office of Germany, which allegedly established that Usmanov "transferred assets", including the Dilbar yacht, to Ismailova. The following was stated in the EU sanctions rationale: "Since 2017, Usmanov has no longer been a shareholder of this trust company. As a result, his sister, Ms. Gulbakhor Ismailova, has remained the sole beneficial owner of the Dilbar yacht".

The charter of the trust in which the yacht is held contained a clause on the automatic removal of any person from the list of beneficiaries immediately after being sanctioned. In this regard, after the imposition of sanctions, Ismailova was automatically excluded from the list of beneficiaries of the trust.

In September 2022, German investigatory authorities conducted a search of the Dilbar yacht.

In May 2023, the Regional Court of Frankfurt am Main ruled that the search of the Dilbar yacht conducted by German law enforcement agencies in September 2022 was illegal. The court ruled that the issued search warrants were unlawful. In October 2023, the court of Frankfurt am Main ruled that all items seized during the illegal search in 2022, including that of the Dilbar yacht, must be returned to their owners.

In March 2024, the statement by the Federal Criminal Police Office of Germany including the publications on X in which it was stated that Ismailova was the "owner" of the Dilbar yacht were removed. The agency officially undertook to no longer disseminate those statements.

During the same period Ismailova signed an official waiver of receiving benefits from the trusts. That meant that she would not be able to restore her right to receive benefits from the trusts, including the trust in which the Dilbar yacht is held, even after lifting the sanctions.

In February 2025, Germany's largest news agency Deutsche Presse-Agentur (DPA) officially retracted its piece of news dated 2022, in which Ismailova was referred to as the owner of Dilbar. The agency recommended that all its media partners remove those publications to avoid legal claims.

On March 14, 2025, the EU Council removed Ismailova from the sanctions list.

On June 11, 2026, the court of Frankfurt am Main upheld the claim of the Lürssen shipyard and ruled that the Dilbar yacht could not be considered frozen under the EU sanctions regime, and the authorities failed to prove that Usmanov or his sister have any influence over the trust in which the yacht is held.

=== Philanthropy ===
According to media reports, Usmanov has donated about $7.3 billion to charity.

In March 2026, one of the world's largest cultural and educational complexes dedicated to the history of Islam - the Center for Islamic Civilization - opened in Tashkent, Uzbekistan, with major funding from Alisher Usmanov. President Shavkat Mirziyoyev expressed his official gratitude to Usmanov for his participation in the project.

In 2021, The Sunday Times named Usmanov the most generous philanthropist on its Rich List, donating more than £4.2 billion to charity over the 20-year history of The Sunday Times Giving List. In 2012, Russian Forbes named Usmanov Philanthropist of the Year.

In 2006, Usmanov founded "Art, Science and Sport" Charity Fund. The fund provided financial support for exhibitions at Tate Britain in London including the J. M. W. Turner exhibition in 2008 and the Pre-Raphaelites exhibition in 2013.

Usmanov is a Trustee for the Russian Geographical Society, Moscow State Institute of International Relations, National Research University Higher School of Economics, and the European University at St Petersburg.

In 2015, he donated €1.5 million toward the restoration of the Basilica Ulpia in Rome.

In February 2020, Usmanov purchased Pierre de Coubertin's original 1892 Olympic Manifesto for $8.8 million, which he donated to the Olympic Museum. The manifesto has become the world's most expensive piece of sports memorabilia.

Two years in a row, in 2020 and 2021, Usmanov topped the list of contributors to causes related to COVID-19 among the participants of The Sunday Times Rich List with donations Russia, Uzbekistan and Italy of £134.2 m.

On 17 September 2007, Usmanov paid more than £20 million for an art collection owned by the late Russian cellist Mstislav Rostropovich, days before it was to be auctioned by Sotheby's in London. He gave all the artwork to the Russian state, where it is housed in the Konstantinovsky Palace near St. Petersburg. Later that same month he purchased the rights to a large collection of Soviet cartoons, which for fifteen years had been owned by Russian-born actor Oleg Vidov, who emigrated to the United States in 1985. After the deal, valued at $5 to 10 million, Usmanov donated the cartoon collection to a newly formed Russian children's television channel.

According to presidential decree No. 365 of 17 March 2004, Usmanov was awarded with a Medal of Honor of Russia. In 2011, Usmanov received the Order "Dostyk" (Friendship) 2nd degree of the Republic of Kazakhstan. In 2013, he was awarded the Order for Service to the Fatherland IV class in recognition of his services to the state, as well as his community and charitable activities. In the same year, he was awarded a medal 'For contribution to international cooperation' by the Foreign Ministry of Russia. In 2014, Usmanov received the Order of Alexander Nevsky for his community and charitable activities. In 2016 he received The Decoration "For Beneficence" for his contribution to charitable and social activities in Russia. The same year Usmanov received the Al-Fahr Order for his great contribution to the revival of Islam in Russia. In 2017, Mr. Usmanov was awarded the title of Commander "Order of Merit of the Italian Republic" for architectural restoration projects. The award was presented by the President of Italy Sergio Mattarella. In 2018 Usmanov received the Order "For Merit to the Fatherland" 3rd class. In 2018, he was also awarded the Order "Dostyk" 1st degree (Kazakhstan) for his significant contribution to the and cultural development of the country, strengthening friendship and cooperation between peoples. In addition, in 2018, he received the Order of El-Yurt Hurmati "Respected by people and homeland" (Uzbekistan) for the effective implementation of major investment projects in the country, active participation in the creation of unique spiritual and educational complexes in Uzbekistan to revive and preserve the rich historical heritage and national values of our people, sincere love for the country, being an example for young people, and for assistance in developing sports and tourism potential of the country.

On 4 December 2014, Usmanov paid $4.8 million for Dr James Watson's Nobel Prize Medal in Physiology or Medicine, which was auctioned at Christie's in New York City. Watson was selling his prize to raise money to support scientific research. After auctions fees, Watson received $4.1 million. Usmanov subsequently returned the medal to Watson, stating "in my opinion, a situation in which an outstanding scientist sells a medal recognizing his achievements is unacceptable. Watson's work contributed to cancer research, the illness from which my father died. It is important for me that the money that I spent on this medal will go to supporting scientific research, and the medal will stay with the person who deserved it."

== See also ==
- List of Russian billionaires
- List of people and organizations sanctioned during the Russo-Ukrainian War
