= VK (company) =

Russian internet company

VK Company Limited
- Formerly: Digital Sky Technologies; Mail.ru Group
- Type: Public
- Traded as: MCX: VKCO; LSE: VKCO
- Industry: Internet information providers
- Founded: 15 October 1998; 28 years ago
- Headquarters: Moscow, Russia
- Area served: Worldwide
- Key people: Vladimir Kiriyenko (CEO)
- Services: electronic mail, search engine, file hosting service, social networking (VK, OK.ru), instant messaging, e-commerce, communication, transport
- Revenue: $1.88 billion (2025)
- Operating income: −$1.63 billion (2025)
- Net income: −$258 million (2025)
- Total assets: $3.91 billion (2025)
- Total equity: $1.56 billion (2025)
- Number of employees: More than 10 000 (2022)
- Parent: USM Holdings
- Subsidiaries: My.com; My.Games
- Website: vk.company

VK, known as Mail.ru Group until 12 October 2021, is a Russian technology company. It started in 1998 as the parent company of Mail.ru, an e-mail service, and went on to become a major corporate figure in the Russian-speaking segment of the Internet.

VK operates an e-mail service, Internet portal Mail.ru, and Russian social networking services VK, Odnoklassniki and Moi Mir. Additionally, VK manages various e-commerce, transport and communication platforms. It also offers business-oriented products, including a corporate email and communication system.

In 2014, VK's sites reached approximately 86% of Russian Internet users on a monthly basis, and the company was in the top 5 of the largest Internet companies based on the number of total pages viewed.

In October 2021, Mail.ru Group was renamed VK Company Limited, after its most popular product, VKontakte.

== History ==
The business was originally owned by Port.ru, a company founded in 1998 by Eugene Goland, Michael Zaitsev and Alexey Krivenkov as a spin-off from DataArt. It received an initial investment of US$1 million from investor James Melcher.

The Mail.ru business expanded rapidly to reach the No. 1 market position in Russia by 2000. Attempts to fund the company's expansion in 2000–2001 were thwarted by the collapse of the technology bubble and Mail.ru had to seek merger partners.

In 2001 Yuri Milner, at the time managing NetBridge (the owner of several internet brands), persuaded the entrepreneur Igor Linshits to back a merger of the Mail.ru business with NetBridge. Igor Linshits subsequently took an active role in the development of the Mail.ru business. In connection with the merger, Milner became Mail.ru CEO.

The company began to operate as Mail.ru on 16 October 2001 and was headed by Dmitry Grishin. Before that time its brand name was owned by Port.ru.

In 2003 Milner resigned from Mail.ru and subsequently set up another internet venture, Digital Sky Technologies (DST). In 2006 Igor Linshits sold his stake in Mail.ru to Tiger Fund and Milner's DST for more than $100 million. In September 2010, DST changed its name to Mail.ru Group. Dmitry Grishin became one of the Mail.ru Group co-founders.

In February 2010 Mail.ru announced the 100% acquisition of the video game developer Astrum Nival from its former owners. From that point, Astrum Nival acts under the name of Mail.ru. On 29 September 2011, the studio was renamed to Allods Team. The studio is known for developing Allods Online and Skyforge.

In October 2010 Mail.ru Group announced plans for an IPO via the London Stock Exchange listing of a subsidiary – also called Mail.ru – worth more than $5 billion. The IPO offered a stake of about 17% of the subsidiary. The subsidiary included about a quarter of the group's shareholding in Facebook, stakes in Russia's two biggest social networking sites and Mail.ru. The company hired Goldman Sachs, JP Morgan, Morgan Stanley and VTB Capital to run the listing. After the public offering, the global operations of Mail.ru Group continued as the privately held company DST Global. Major shareholders at the time included Alisher Usmanov, Mail.ru Group's corporate sibling Tencent Holdings, Tencent's largest shareholder Prosus, and Tiger Management.

In March 2012 Milner stepped down from the role of Chairman of Mail.ru and from the board of directors. Dmitry Grishin was elected to the board of directors and appointed as chairman of the Board while retaining his CEO position. There were no other changes to management or to the Board. On 11 May 2022, Dmitry Grishin stepped down as chairman of the board of directors and non-executive director of the company.

In November 2012 it was reported that Mail.ru would discontinue using Google search services. Full migration to the use of Mail.ru's own engine occurred in the summer of 2013.

In late 2012 Mail.ru Group's plans for buying two-letter domain My.com became known. This was interpreted as an intention of dominating world markets and of the upcoming re-branding of services under this name. At the end of 2012, Mail.ru Group bought the Ukrainian email service mail.ua and the registration of email addresses using this domain started on 23 April 2013.

On 3 October 2016 Mail.ru announced that they had acquired 100% of the game developer Pixonic's shares.

In January 2018 Mail.ru acquired ESForce, a holding company that owns a number of different esports businesses, including both Virtus.pro and SK Gaming, for US$150 million.

In September 2018 Alibaba announced buying a 10% stake in Mail.ru, which would have a value of $484 million based on Mail.ru's market capitalization on 10 September 2018.

In July 2019 Tencent-backed iDreamSky Technology Holdings and Mail.ru Group announced an alliance in the gaming sector in China and Europe. In December 2019, Mail.ru Group formed a partnership with Sberbank to develop the food and transportation service O2O.

In 2020 the state Russian Direct Investment Fund, China's Tencent, Naspers, and others bought $600 million of GDRs and bonds from Mail.ru. The funds were raised for the development of O2O and AliExpress Russia.

In October 2021 Sberbank of Russia and "Mail.ru Group" invested 6,1 billion roubles each O2O food and transportation service, the total of their investments in equal shares now touching about 43 billion roubles in 2021. On the whole, shares of both investors did not change from 45,01% each. Also in October 2021, Mail.ru Group was renamed VK Company Limited, after its most popular product, VKontakte.

In November 2021 Sberbank of Russia signed binding papers for selling its 36% of shares of "MF Tekhnologii" (controlling entity of VK company) to Gazprombank for 12,8 billion of roubles by the end of the year 2021.

In December 2021 Sogaz Group bought all USM's (owned by Alisher Usmanov and his partners) indirect stake in "MF Tekhnologii" (controlling 57,3% of VK company). The state-run insurance company Sogaz Group is partly owned by Vladimir Putin's close friend Yury Kovalchuk.

On 26 September 2022 the VKontakte social networking app was removed from Apple's App Store, along with VK's Mail.ru, Mail.ru Cloud, VK Music, and VK Clips.

On 7 October 2022 VK's subsidiary "ITR" acquired 87.2% of the interactive video platform developer Movika.

On 19 December 2022 VK announced the signing of a contract to acquire 51% of LLC "Medium Quality Production", one of the leaders in digital video content production in the CIS.

In February 2023, VK acquired 75% of the educational portal Uchi.ru for RUB 8.7bn, consolidating 100% of the company. In turn, in December, Uchi.ru received approval from the Federal Antimonopoly Service to purchase the UFirst chain of English language schools, which is the successor of English First schools.

In early July 2023, one of VK's structures, VK Digital Technologies, was awarded a contract to automate the work of officials. The project includes transferring Russian civil servants from Telegram to domestic communication services.

In December, it was announced that it had bought a 100% stake in YClients Group, Russia's largest online enrolment and business automation platform for an unnamed amount. The company had 37,000 SME customers in 2022.

In February 2024, the company announced that it had developed its own large language model (LLM). In particular, comments from open VKontakte groups were used in its training. The first generative capabilities of the model are being tested on Mail.ru services.

In May 2024, VK closed a deal to buy ticket aggregator Intickets. The company received a 40% stake in the platform, which is a contractor for Moscow museums and theatres.

In July 2025, the company acquired the video service Viqeo to strengthen the advertising direction of VK Video. The acquired platform allows videos to be embedded on other websites and services.

== Services ==
VK Group offers a variety of online communication products and entertainment services for Russian speakers all over the world, such as:

- Email & portal – mailing service, Main portal, content projects
- Social networks – VK, OK.ru, My World
- Instant messaging – Agent, Max
- Online Games via a newly founded brand called My.Games – MMO games, Social games, Mobile games
- News aggregation - Dzen News
- Search & e-commerce – Search, Headhunter, Price comparison
- My.com – integrated communication and entertainment platform.
- Cloud – cloud storage similar to Dropbox, apps available for PC and smartphones
- DST Global – private equity and venture capital investments
- Marusia – voice virtual assistant app for smartphones
- Сapsula – smart speaker
- DonationAlerts – stream monetizing service

=== Defunct ===
- Instant Messaging - ICQ

== Controversies ==
On 15 May 2017 Ukrainian President Petro Poroshenko signed a decree to impose a ban on Mail.ru and its social networking services including VKontakte and Odnoklassniki as part of Ukraine's continued sanctions on Russia for its annexation of Crimea and involvement in the war in Donbas. The move was widely criticised as censorship, and Reporters Without Borders condemned the ban, calling it a "disproportionate measure that seriously undermines the Ukrainian people's right to information and freedom of expression." Mail.ru itself estimated (in August 2017) that the ban had cost them around 1.5% of total revenues in 2017.

On 5 November 2017 the Paradise Papers, a set of confidential electronic documents relating to offshore investment, revealed that Russian state organizations with ties to Vladimir Putin pursued between 2009 and 2011 large investments in Facebook and Twitter via an intermediary—Russian-American billionaire and entrepreneur Yuri Milner, founder of Mail.ru and DST Global, who had befriended Facebook founder Mark Zuckerberg and was a business associate of Jared Kushner, President Donald Trump's son-in-law.

In 2023, a Moscow magistrate court fined VK 60,000 roubles (US$900) for leaking the data of 3.5 million Mail.ru users.

In July 2026, the European Union has imposed sanctions against VK over surveillance of MAX users.
