= Sunday Times Rich List 2020 =

The Sunday Times Rich List 2020 is the 32nd annual survey of the wealthiest people resident in the United Kingdom, published by The Sunday Times on 17 May 2020.

The list was edited by Robert Watts who succeeded long-term compiler Philip Beresford in 2017.

The list was previewed in the previous week's Sunday Times and widely reported by other media.

== Top 20 fortunes ==
2020		Name	Citizenship	Source of wealth	2019	
Rank	Net worth £ bn	Name	Citizenship	Source of wealth	Rank	Net worth £ bn
01 ▲	£16.20 ▲	Sir James Dyson and family	United Kingdom	Industry (Dyson)	5	£12.50
02= ▼	£16.00 ▼	Sri and Gopi Hinduja	India	Industry and finance	1	£22.00
02= ▼	£16.00 ▼	David and Simon Reuben	United Kingdom	Property and Internet	3	£18.66
04	£15.781 ▲	Sir Len Blavatnik	United States & United Kingdom	Investment, music and media	4	£14.37
05 ▼	£12.15 ▼	Sir Jim Ratcliffe	United Kingdom	Industry (Ineos)	3	£18.15
06	£12.10 ▼	Kirsten Rausing and Jörn Rausing	Sweden	Inheritance and investment (Tetra Pak)	6	£12.26
07 ▲	£11.68 ▲	Alisher Usmanov	Russia	Mining and investment	8	£11.34
08 ▲	£10.53 ▲	Guy Weston, Galen Weston Jr., George G. Weston and Weston family	Canada & United Kingdom	Retailing	13	£10.05
09 ▼	£10.30 ▼	Charlene de Carvalho-Heineken and Michel de Carvalho	Netherlands	Inheritance, banking, brewing (Heineken)	7	£12.00
10 ▲	£10.295 ▲	The 7th Duke of Westminster and Grosvenor family	United Kingdom	Inheritance and property	14	£10.10
11 ▼	£10.234 ▼	Mikhail Fridman	Russia & Israel	Banking	10	£10.90
12 ▼	10.156 ▼	Roman Abramovich	Russia & Israel	Oil and industry	9	£11.221
13 ▲	£9.59 ▼	Marit Rausing and family	Sweden	Inheritance and investment (Tetra Pak)	16	£9.606
14 ▲	£9.2 ▼	Ernesto and Kirsty Bertarelli	Switzerland & United Kingdom	Pharmaceuticals	15	£9.711
15 ▼	£8.5 ▼	Anil Agarwal	India	Mining	12	£10.57
16 ▲	£7.166 ▲	Denise Coates and Peter Coates	United Kingdom	Gambling	19	£6.856
17	£7.00 ▼	Sir David Barclay and Sir Frederick Barclay	United Kingdom	Property, media, internet retailing	17	£7.20
18 ▲	£6.817 ▼	Charles Cadogan, 8th Earl Cadogan and family	United Kingdom	Property	20	£6.85
19 ▼	£6.781 ▼	Lakshmi Mittal and family	India	Steel	11	£10.669
20 ▼	£6.625 ▼	John Fredriksen and family	Cyprus & Norway	Shipping and oil services	18	£7.543

== See also ==
- Forbes list of billionaires
