= DST Global =

Venture capital firm

- Company type: Private
- Industry: Investment management
- Founded: 2009; 17 years ago
- Founders: Yuri Milner; Saurabh Gupta; John Lindfors; Rahul Mehta; Tom Stafford
- Headquarters: Cayman Islands
- Products: Venture capital Private equity
- AUM: US$50 billion
- Website: www.dst-global.com

DST Global is a venture capital and private equity firm that primarily invests in late-stage internet companies. DST Global's founder is Yuri Milner and its co-founders are Saurabh Gupta, John Lindfors, Rahul Mehta and Tom Stafford. The company was founded in 2009 as a spinoff from Russian company Digital Sky Technologies, which became Mail.ru Group (later the VK company). In the early 2010s, DST Global international investments were focused on emerging markets such as China.

== Background ==
Yuri Milner founded Digital Sky Technologies (now known as VK) in 1999 that through acquisitions has become a leading Russian language website in terms of users. In 2010, Digital Sky Technologies changed its name to Mail.ru Group and successfully completed an initial public offering on the London Stock Exchange. Although initial investments in American Internet companies were done by Mail.ru, it became clear that a dedicated fund management operation was required to continue investing at scale. As a result, DST Global was set up in 2009 by Yuri Milner as a separate fund management company for international investments. In 2012, Milner stepped down from his role as Mail.ru Chairman to fully focus on DST Global. In the capital of the third fund, Milner and Usmanov, as in the case of the second fund, contributed $50 million worth of Facebook shares. Special conditions were offered for investors of the first two funds. They could buy Facebook shares at a 12% discount to the "internal valuation" calculated using the DST method: at that time, the entire Facebook company was valued at $74 billion, for investors - $9 billion less. In addition, these investors paid fund managers 25% less than everyone else.

In July 2015, the formation of the DST Global V fund began; by August, it had raised $1.7 billion. The composition of shareholders, as well as the final size of the fund, are unknown. The main capital was attracted from private sovereign funds and private individual investors.

Since the Mail.ru Group's IPO, DST Global is the sole vehicle for further international investments. The company is now fully independent of Mail.ru Group.

DST Global has offices in Menlo Park, New York, London, and Hong Kong. The registered office of the DST Global funds is in the Cayman Islands.

Notable investments of the DST Global include Facebook, Twitter, WhatsApp, Snapchat, Spotify, Alibaba, Toutiao/ByteDance and Xiaohongshu.

== Funds ==
Funds	Vintage Year	Committed Capital (US$m)
DST Global I	2008	N/A
DST Global II	2011	1,000
DST Global III	2012	N/A
DST Global IV	2014	1,000
DST Global V	2015	1,700
DST Global VI	2018	N/A
DST Global VII	2019	N/A
DST Global VIII	2021	N/A
DST Global IX	2021	4,000

== Relationship with Russia ==
A Kremlin-owned firm, VTB Bank, put $191 million into DST Global, which used it to buy a large share of Twitter in 2011. A subsidiary of the Kremlin-controlled Gazprom funded an investment company that partnered with DST Global to buy shares in Facebook, reaping millions when the social media giant went public in 2012. Twitter similarly went public in 2013. The US government sanctioned VTB in 2014 because of the Russian military intervention in Crimea, but DST Global had sold its stake in Twitter by then. Four days after the Facebook IPO, a DST Global subsidiary sold more than 27 million shares of Facebook for roughly $1 billion. In November 2017, DST Global issued the statement in response to this accusation: “Since 2009, DST Global has invested $7 billion in the consumer internet sector, with a majority being invested in non-U.S. companies — and with less than 5% coming from VTB Bank. VTB Bank was the only Russian government institution that invested in any DST Global funds... Moreover, there were dozens of DST Global investors making up the funds that invested in Facebook and Twitter — ....50 passive investors that invested in Facebook..., and VTB Bank was one of 40 passive investors... that invested in Twitter” Yuri Milner published his own open letter in ReCode magazine stated that "DST Global's investments in Silicon Valley were motivated by pure business logic, based on a decade of experience in Internet technology... when we negotiated the Facebook and Twitter deals we asked for no board seats, and assigned all our votes to their founders, figuring they knew best how to run their companies. At the time, this structure was unusual, but it is core to DST Global's philosophy." DST Global funds have invested in over 80 companies, none of which are based in Russia.

In 2022, due to additional sanctions being placed on Russia resulting from the 2022 Russian invasion of Ukraine, DST Global became a subject of scrutiny due to its ties to Russia. A DST Global representative stated that the firm had not raised capital from Russian limited partners since 2011. Less than 3% of capital it had raised from inception was from VTB Bank and all such capital was returned by 2014. On DST Global's website, the firm announced it condemned Russia's war against Ukraine. In addition the firm donated $3 million to Stand With Ukraine, a GoFundMe initiative launched by Mila Kunis and Ashton Kutcher to help the refugee and humanitarian relief efforts.

Milner said, "The great irony is that we are the least Russian fund right now and have been because we made a consistent effort." He told Bloomberg News that DST hasn't taken money from Russia since a $900 million fund in 2011, and most Western banks were in business with Russia until years after he stopped.
