= Yuri Milner =

Israeli entrepreneur and physicist (born 1961)

- יורי מילנר
- Milner in 2017
- Born: 11 November 1961 (age 65); Moscow, Russian SFSR, Soviet Union
- Citizenship: Soviet Union (until 1991); Russia (1991–2022); Israel (since 1999)
- Education: Moscow State University (BS); University of Pennsylvania (MBA)
- Occupations: Businessman: venture capitalist, founder of Digital Sky Technologies and DST Global
- Spouse: Julia Bochkova (m. 2004)
- Children: 3
- Parents: Bentsion Milner (father); Betty Milner (mother)
- Website: Official website

Yuri Borisovich (Bentsionovich) Milner (Hebrew: יורי מילנר, Russian: Юрий Борисович (Бенционович) Мильнер; born 11 November 1961) is an Israeli entrepreneur, investor, physicist and scientist. He is a co-founder and former chairperson of internet company Mail.Ru Group (later VK), and a founder of investment firm DST Global.

== Early life ==
Born into a Jewish family on 11 November 1961, in Moscow, Yuri Milner was the second child of Soviet intellectuals. His father, Bentsion Zakharovitch Milner, was Chief Deputy Director at the Institute of Economics of the Russian Academy of Sciences and was active in management and organization. Betty Iosifovna Milner, Yuri's mother, worked at Moscow's state-run virological laboratory for disease control. His older sister, eight years his senior, is an architect. In 1985, he graduated from the Faculty of Physics of Lomonosov University. He then worked at the Lebedev Physical Institute in the field of theoretical physics under the supervision of future Nobel laureate Vitaly Ginzburg.

Milner became an Israeli citizen in 1999. In 2005, he moved to Israel with his family. They relocated to California in 2014. Milner has stated he has not been to Russia since the 2014 Russian annexation of Crimea. In August 2022, he renounced his Russian citizenship, reportedly in response to the Russian Invasion of Ukraine.

== Education ==
Milner studied theoretical physics at Moscow State University, graduating in 1985. He went on to work at Lebedev Physical Institute, one of the institutes of the Russian Academy of Sciences. As a doctoral candidate in particle physics, Milner befriended Soviet nuclear physicist and human rights activist Andrei Sakharov. Sakharov's co-founder would later influence Milner's venture investment strategy.

In 1990, Milner became the first non-émigré from the Soviet Union to travel to the United States to receive a Master of Business Administration (MBA) at the Wharton School of the University of Pennsylvania. The press quoted him as saying that he made this decision after "being disappointed in myself as a physicist." Milner was a commencement speaker for the Wharton Business School's 2017 class.

== Business career ==
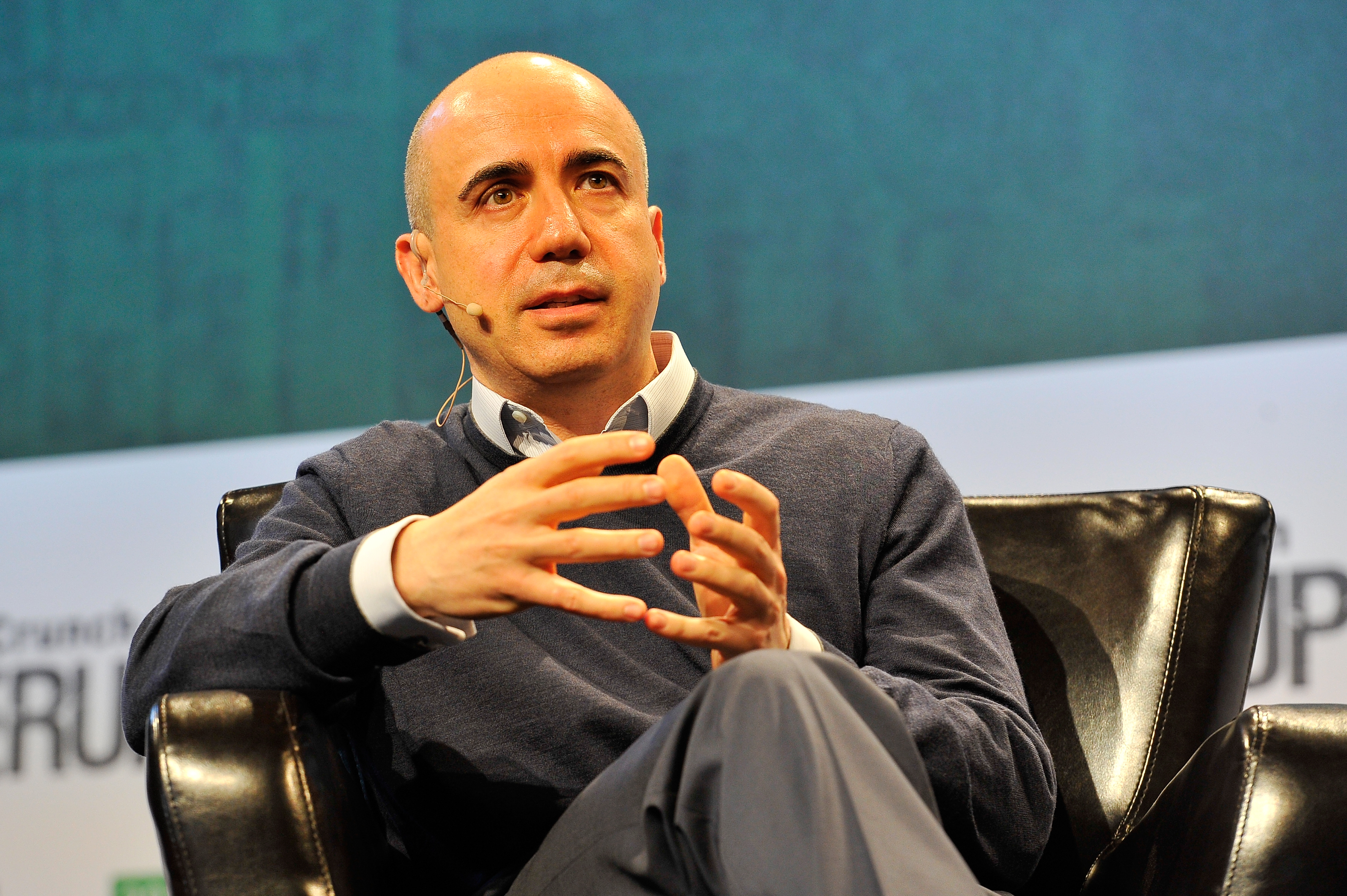
Yuri Milner

Milner started his business career selling gray market DOS computers in the Soviet Union, which displeased his father. When the USSR collapsed, he stopped selling computers in order to enroll at the Wharton School to earn an MBA.

After graduating, Milner spent the first half of the 1990s at the World Bank in Washington, D.C., as a Russian banking specialist focused on the development of private sector banking. He has described his time at the World Bank as his "lost years", due to the privatization of government holdings during the presidency of Boris Yeltsin. In the spring of 1995, Milner was appointed CEO of Alliance-Menatep, a stock brokerage company belonging to then oligarch Mikhail Khodorkovsky.

In December 1996, Milner worked as vice president and Head of Investment Management of Menatep Bank. In February 1997 Milner was appointed the deputy chairperson and the head of the investment division of Menatep Bank but left this position in early 1998. At the time, the market makers described him as "a well-known professional, who will bring the bank valuable experience in international financial institutions and transactions in the Russian investment market".

=== Russian Internet investments ===
In 1999, after reading a review by Morgan Stanley analyst Mary Meeker on the prospects for online businesses, Milner decided to create an Internet company. He sought funding from his friend from Menatep days Gregory Finger, who at the time led the Russian branch of the US investment fund New Century Holding. The fund agreed to invest $4.5 million with the proviso that Milner and Finger each personally invest $750,000. Milner, Finger, and NCH created a new company, NetBridge. In 2000, Milner became the president of Netbridge Services Ltd. (netBridge) – the company that was, "created as an Internet incubator and investment fund". Netbridge succeeded in transferring a variety of U.S.-pioneered Internet business models to Russia, creating companies including the portal List.ru, online auction site Molotok.ru (based on eBay), free web-hosting Boom.ru (based on GeoCities), and online shop 24×7, using the formula of Amazon.com.

In February 2001, netBridge and Port.ru (which owned Mail.ru) announced a merger. Milner became CEO of the new company named Mail.Ru (though the legal name Port.ru was also retained).

In 2005, NCH shifted its focus from Russian Internet projects and Milner founded the investment fund Digital Sky Technologies (DST), becoming its chairperson in 2006. A meeting through mutual friends resulted in Alisher Usmanov becoming a shareholder of Digital Sky Technologies (DST) in 2008. On 16 September 2010, Digital Sky Technologies (DST) changed its name to "Mail.ru Group".

In 2010, Mail.ru Group completed successful initial public offering on the London Stock Exchange with market valuation of $5.6 billion.

In March 2012, Milner stepped down from the role of chairperson of Mail.ru and from the board of directors. Dmitry Grishin was elected to the board and appointed as chairperson while retaining his CEO position. There were no other changes to management or to the board.

Post Mail.ru Group's IPO, DST is the sole vehicle for further international investments. The company is now fully independent of Mail.ru Group.

From May 2009 to January 2012, Milner was a member of the Commission on Modernization established by Dmitry Medvedev, the Russian President from 2008 to 2012.

=== Technology investments ===
In January 2009, while in Palo Alto, Milner became acquainted with Facebook founder Mark Zuckerberg. The meeting led to an agreement on 26 May 2009 under which DST bought a 1.96% stake in Facebook for $200 million.

On 16 September 2010, Digital Sky Technologies (DST) changed its name to "Mail.ru Group". The group's portfolio included Mail.ru, Odnoklassniki.ru, ICQ, a minority stake in the social network VKontakte (Russian Facebook equivalent), online payments service OSMP.ru, e‑Port, as well as some other Russian assets. Milner's commercial interests in Facebook, Zynga, and Groupon were transferred to DST Global. Milner became the CEO of DST Global and the chairperson of the board of directors of Mail.ru Group. In November 2010, Mail.ru Group held its offering on the London Stock Exchange. In March 2012, Milner stepped down from the role of chairperson of Mail.ru and from the board of directors.

On 5 November 2017, The New York Times reported that Milner had strong Kremlin backing for his investments in Facebook (over 8%) and Twitter (5%). His companies sold these holdings two years before that report was made public however, Milner denied any allegation he was working with Russia to turn social media against US Democracy in his open letter published in ReCode.

=== Altos Labs ===
In September 2021, an investment vehicle held for the benefit of the Breakthrough Foundation, co-founded by Yuri and Julia Milner, which supports existing and future philanthropic projects in fundamental sciences, invested in Altos Labs together with Amazon.com founder Jeff Bezos. Altos Labs is a funded biotechnology company dedicated to harnessing cellular reprogramming to develop longevity therapeutics. The company has recruited prominent scientists such as Juan Carlos Izpisúa Belmonte (known for work on rejuvenation through reprogramming), Steve Horvath (known for work in epigenetic aging clocks), and Shinya Yamanaka (the Nobel Prize-winning inventor of cellular reprogramming in mammalian cells). Milner reportedly originally considered pursuing reprogramming philanthropically, having already awarded three-year grants of $1 million a year to several geroscience researchers, but was convinced by former National Cancer Institute head Richard Klausner that a well-funded biotech company would lead to faster progress.

=== Selected investments ===
- On 29 January 2011, Milner announced that he would invest $150,000 into each of the start‑up program participants selected by the incubator Y Combinator.
- In February 2014, it was announced that Milner had led a round of funding for cloud-graphics company, Otoy.
- In April 2016, online mortgage broker platform Habito launched with backing from Milner, amongst other fintech investors.

=== Forbes list controversy ===
On 29 January 2018, Milner's name was included in the United States Treasury Department's "Report to Congress Pursuant to Section 241 of the Countering America's Adversaries Through Sanctions Act of 2017 Regarding Senior Foreign Political Figures and Oligarchs in the Russian Federation and Russian Parastatal Entities" (CAATSA), a list of 96 individuals of Russian heritage who "have an estimated net worth of $1 billion or more".

Although it was widely reported in the media that those on the list "may be subject to sanctions", the CAATSA Report itself made clear that it "in no way should be interpreted to impose sanctions on those individuals or entities". It also specified that inclusion in the report "does not constitute the determination by any agency that any of those individuals or entities meet the criteria for designation under any sanctions program", and in no way indicates that "the U.S. Government has information about the individual's involvement in malign activities". Shortly after the list was released, it was reported that the Treasury Department had simply copied it from the Forbes' 2017 The World's Billionaires list: people on the Forbes list who had Russian heritage and a net worth of $1 billion or more had been indiscriminately included in the CAATSA Report.

In its response to a lawsuit asserting that the compilation of the list was "arbitrary, capricious, and contrary to law", the Treasury Department has confirmed that it is "not challenging" the allegation that it had "simply republished" the Forbes billionaires list. In April 2020, in its annual Billionaire List Forbes magazine re-classified Yuri Milner from the Russian list to the Israeli list of billionaires, confirming his Israeli citizenship and close ties to the country.

== Philanthropy ==
=== Breakthrough Prize ===
In July 2012, Yuri and Julia Milner established the Breakthrough Prize, joined the following year by Sergey Brin, Priscilla Chan, Anne Wojcicki, and Mark Zuckerberg. The Prize is a set of international awards recognizing three fields of endeavor: Breakthrough Prize in Fundamental Physics, Breakthrough Prize in Life Sciences, and Breakthrough Prize in Mathematics. Laureates receive $3 million each in prize money, making the Breakthrough Prize the largest scientific award in the world.

=== Breakthrough Initiatives ===
In July 2015, Milner launched Breakthrough Initiatives, a scientific program to investigate the question of life in the Universe. He announced the initiatives at the Royal Society in London, alongside Stephen Hawking, Martin Rees, Frank Drake, Geoff Marcy and Ann Druyan.

=== COVID-19 response ===
On 25 March 2020, the Milner Foundation, a non-profit foundation co-founded by Yuri and Julia Milner, announced $3 million donation to three Israeli institutions: Magen David Adom, the national emergency medical response organization; Tel Aviv University Faculty of Medicine and Life Sciences; and Tel Aviv Sourasky Medical Center, Ichilov Hospital.

A few weeks later, Milner Foundation announced a donation of 3 million face masks for the people of Israel. Yuri Milner in his open letter published by Calcalist wrote that "a significant fraction of these masks will go to organizations providing essential services, whose frontline workers are still required to do their jobs during the lockdown". The masks arrived to Ben Gurion Airport on 16 April 2020, on board of dedicated charted El Al "Jerusalem of Gold" Dreamliner plane and were distributed by Magen David Adom to its emergency services staff, as well as to a range of hospitals, government offices, and national institutions providing essential services to the public.

=== Response to Russia's invasion of Ukraine ===
Milner's companies have denounced the invasion on multiple occasions, and Milner has personally condemned Russia's war against Ukraine on his Twitter account. Milner has not visited Russia since the 2014 Russian occupation of Crimea, and renounced his Russian citizenship in response to the Russian invasion of Ukraine. He has also donated tens of millions of dollars on several occasions in support of Ukrainian refugees.

Milner said, "The great irony is that we are the least Russian fund right now and have been because we made a consistent effort." He told Bloomberg News that DST hasn't taken money from Russia since a $900 million fund in 2011, and most Western banks were in business with Russia until years after he stopped.

==== Tech for Refugees ====
In April 2022, the foundation co-founded by Yuri and Julia Milner pledged $100 million to Tech for Refugees, a philanthropic initiative launched with Airbnb.org, Flexport.org, and Spotify. The initiative is focused on using technology to help refugees from Ukraine to find provisions, shelter, and comfort, and it plans to expand the program to address other refugee crises around the world.

==== Other donations ====
In March 2022, the non-profit foundation co-founded by Yuri and Julia Milner as well as DST Global, and the Breakthrough Prize Foundation all donated funds to support humanitarian relief for refugees fleeing the Russian invasion of Ukraine. The Breakthrough Prize Foundation donated $3 million to international relief organizations to help the victims of the conflict, and pledged a further $3 million to support scientists forced to flee from Ukraine. Pledged $3 million were distributed to:

- $1 million to the National Academy of Sciences's initiative to help scientists maintain their livelihoods and dignity after fleeing Ukraine, remaining employed and connected to the global scientific community.
- $1.5 Million to ALLEA, the European Federation of Academies of Sciences and Humanities, for Distribution Via European Academic Institutions.
- $500,000 to consortium of leading Israeli universities led by Tel Aviv University.
- A $2.1 million challenge grant to the U.S. National Academy of Sciences to fund scientific research led by Ukrainian scientists.
- A $800,000 to the Australian Academy of Science to support research collaborations and access to Australian infrastructure and facilities for researchers forced to leave Ukraine.

DST Global committed $3.5 million to Mila Kunis and Ashton Kutcher's Stand With Ukraine initiative to help the refugee relief efforts. The foundation co-founded by Yuri and Julia Milner gave a further $2 million to Stand With Ukraine, as well as donating $3m to the Conference of European Rabbis to support efforts to help Jewish refugees from Ukraine.

=== Giving Pledge ===
On 10 December 2013, Yuri and Julia Milner joined the Giving Pledge, the initiative created by Warren Buffett, Melinda French Gates, and Bill Gates in which signatories pledge to donate the majority of their wealth to philanthropic causes. The Milners announced that their donations would go to predominantly scientific causes and programs, with Yuri Milner stating: "In my opinion, scientific brilliance is currently under-capitalized. If the market dictates that a top banker can earn a thousand times more than a great scientist, then this is an area where philanthropy can make a world of difference—and so make a difference to the world."

== Personal life ==
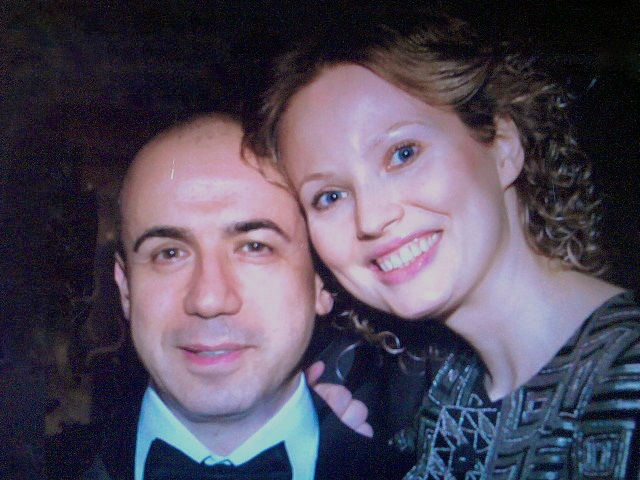
Yuri and Julia

In an interview with Vedomosti in 2010, Milner said:

In the past few years I simply do not have time for hobbies. I am even starting to forget what I was fond of. Such as in the past it was reading of literature not related to work.

Milner is married to former high fashion model and contemporary artist Julia Milner (née Bochkova). She is interested in photography: during the 52nd Venice Biennale of Contemporary Art she produced a contribution entitled Click I Hope.

=== Assets ===
In 2011, Milner bought a $100 million home in Los Altos Hills, California. The compound spans three plots totaling seven hectares and includes a roughly 25,500-square-foot (2,370 m^{2}) main house and a 5,500-square-foot (510 m^{2}) guest house. The Wall Street Journal reported the price as $100 million, saying it was the most ever paid for a single-family home in the United States. The property is appraised by the Santa Clara County assessor at $50 million. Milner attends synagogue, but is only minimally religiously observant.

Milner believes that the Internet will eventually develop into a "global brain" – which is often described as an intelligent network of individuals and machines – functioning as a nervous system for the planet Earth. He also envisages that the advent of the Internet of things and ever increasing use of social media will increase humans' collective intelligence.

He published some of his ideas on humanity's place in the Universe in a book, Eureka Manifesto: the Mission for Our Civilization.

Milner is among a list of people named in the Paradise Papers.

On 24 March 2020, Milner published a fact sheet setting out his and DST Global's relations with Russia. It included statements that he is an Israeli citizen, has never met Vladimir Putin, made 97% of his capital outside Russia, has no assets in Russia and has not visited the country since 2014. Also, DST Global has no investments in Russia and has received no investments from a Russian institution since 2011. In addition, in 2018 the Wall Street Journal confirmed that it had incorrectly named DST Global a Russian firm and it has corrected 13 additional articles containing the same error.

=== Russian citizenship ===
In August 2022, Yuri Milner officially completed the process of renouncing his Russian citizenship.

== Awards and recognitions ==
In September 2017, Forbes included Milner to the list of 100 greatest living business minds. Milner was named one of the World's Greatest Leaders by Fortune magazine in March 2017, was listed in the "Titans" category of Time magazine's 2016 Time 100. Foreign Policy magazine included Milner on its "Power List" – an inaugural list of the 500 most powerful people on the planet in May 2013. Milner was included in Bloomberg Markets' 2012 50 Most Influential list. In Fortune's 2010 list of the world's fifty most prominent businessmen, Milner was ranked 46th. That same year Russian business magazine Vedomosti recognized him as "Businessman of the Year".

- "The World's 50 Greatest Leaders" – Fortune, April 2018.
- "100 Greatest Living Business Minds" – Forbes, September 2017.
- "The World's 50 Greatest Leaders" – Fortune, March 2017.
- "The Midas List 2017" – Forbes, April 2017.
- "The Wired 100 - 2016" – Wired, August 2016.
- "The 100 Richest Tech Billionaires in the World in 2016" – Forbes, August 2016.
- "Time 100 Most Influential People 2016" – Time, April 2016.
- "The Midas List 2016" – Forbes, April 2016.
- "The Midas China List 2016" – Forbes, April 2016.
- "New Establishment List 2015" – Vanity Fair, September 2015.
- "Wired 100" – Wired, August 2015.
- "The Midas List 2014" – Forbes, April 2015.
- "New Establishment List 2014" – Vanity Fair, September 2014.
- "The Midas List 2013" – Forbes, May 2013.
- "Power Map: 500 most powerful people on the planet" – Foreign Policy, May 2013.
- "Most Influential 50" – Bloomberg Markets, September 2012.
- "The Silicon Valley 100" – Business Insider, February 2012.
- "Top 50 Digital Power Players" – The Hollywood Reporter, January 2012.
- "Businessperson of the Year – Top 50" – Fortune, November 2011.
- "Man of the Year" – GQ (Russian), October 2011.
- "Vanity Fair's New Establishment List 2011" – Vanity Fair, September 2011.
- "Kommersant of the Year" – Kommersant, June 2011.
- "The 100 Most Creative People" – Fast Company, May 2011.
- "The Midas List of Tech's Top Investors" - Forbes, April 2011.
- "World's Billionaires" – Forbes, March 2011.
- "Owners of Virtual Reality List" – Forbes (Russian), February 2011.
- "Businessman of the Year" – Vedomosti, December 2010.
- "The Smartest People in Tech" – Fortune, July 2010.
