= Novaya Chara =

Novaya Chara Новая Чара
- Urban-type settlement
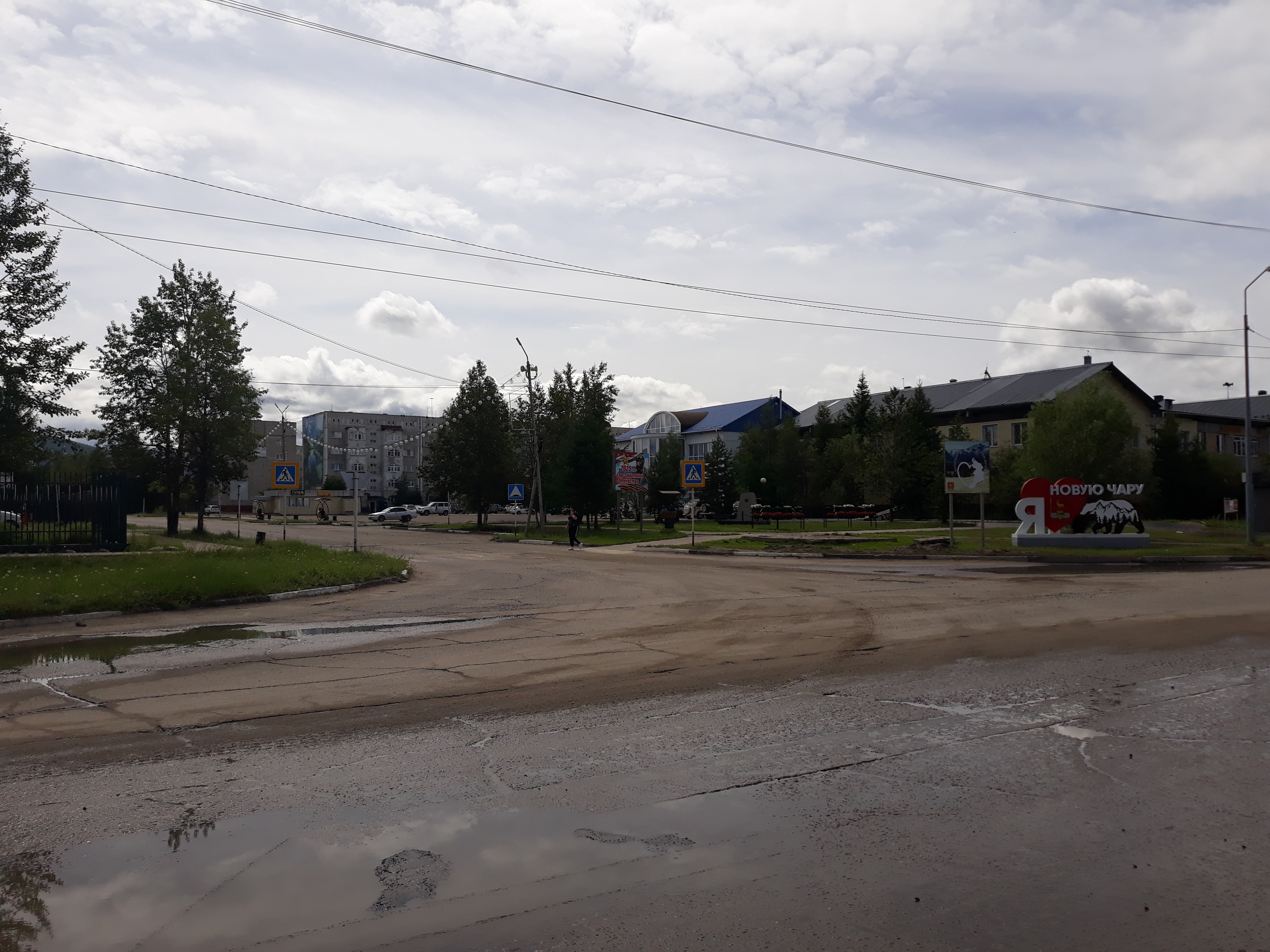
- Novaya Chara in 2025
- Interactive map of Novaya Chara
- Location of Novaya Chara Novaya Chara (Zabaykalsky Krai)
- Coordinates: 56°49′N 118°18′E
- Country: Russia
- Federal subject: Zabaykalsky Krai
- Administrative district: Kalarsky District
- Founded: 1979
- Elevation: 725 m (2,379 ft)

Population (2010 Census)
  - Total: 4,315
  - Estimate (1 January 2018): 3,949 (−8.5%)
- Time zone: UTC+9 (MSK+6)
- Postal code: 674159
- OKTMO ID: 76615156051

Novaya Chara (Russian: Новая Чара) is an urban locality (an urban-type settlement) in Kalarsky District of Zabaykalsky Krai, Russia, located in the basin of the Chara River, in the eastern parts of Stanovoy Range, approximately 600 kilometers (370 mi) in a straight line northeast of the krai's administrative center of Chita, and 16 kilometers (9.9 mi) from the district's administrative center of Chara. Population: 4,315 (2010 census); 4,693 (2002 census); 8,787 (1989 Soviet census).

== History ==
It was founded in connection to the construction of the Baikal-Amur Mainline in the 1980s, near the older village of Chara, named for the river on which it stood. The station and settlement were built by workers from the Kazakh SSR; as part of the BAM project, sections of the route were placed under the patronage of Komsomol brigades from different parts of the Soviet Union.

Regular rail traffic from Tynda in Amur Oblast to Novaya Chara began in 1988; traffic from the west of the settlement on the section from Severobaykalsk started in 1989. The completion of the BAM did not bring the expected economic development to the area, and with the economic crisis of the late 1980s, around half the population left. Nearby are the Udokan copper deposit, Chineysky vanadium deposit and Unkur silver-copper deposit.

== Tourism ==
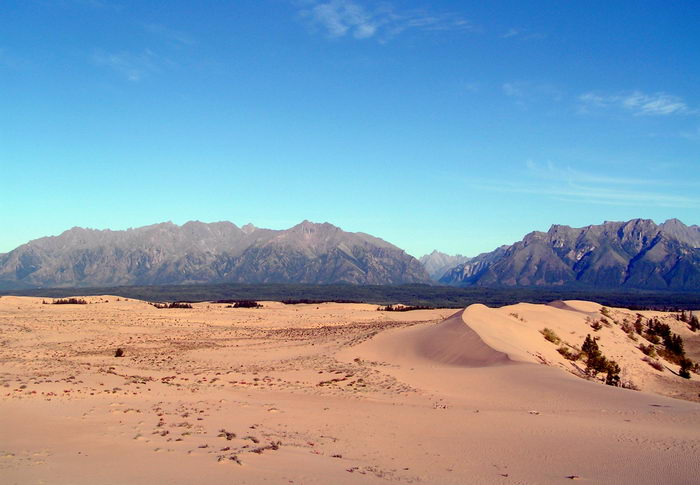
The Chara Sands, a "desert" in the middle of Siberia, near Novaya Chara. The Kodar Mountains lie in the background.

Novaya Chara is the starting point for trekking tours in the Kodar Mountains, as well as the Chara Sands, a 37 square kilometers (14 sq mi) area of sand dunes northwest of the settlement, across the river.

== Economy ==
Novaya Chara's only real economic activity centers on its situation as an important station on the BAM. However, there is potential for the settlement to become the center for a mining region currently under development, with a 66-kilometer (41 mi) branch line built between 1998 and 2002 from Novaya Chara to the titanium, vanadium, and iron ore mine Chineyskoye.

The Chineyskoye mine contains both Russia's largest titanium deposit, and the world's largest recorded vanadium deposit. Due to financing problems with the mines, located at an altitude of over 2,000 meters (6,600 ft), the branch line has been poorly maintained and damaged by landslides, meaning that in 2008 only 26 kilometers (16 mi) were in use; with trucks being used to transport ore to the railhead. Repair and reconstruction of the line is currently being undertaken.

Also on this branch line are the rare-earth metal mine Katuginskoye, iron ore mine Sulumatskoye, and large anthracite deposits at Chitkanda.

Around 30 km (19 mi) south of Novaya Chara is the Udokan copper deposit, which is planned to be mined in future.

Around 15 km (9.3 mi) to the south west of Novaya Chara is the Unkur silver and copper deposit, which is currently under exploration.

The settlement is also served by a small airport.
