= Dmitry Grishin =

Russian businessman (born 1978)

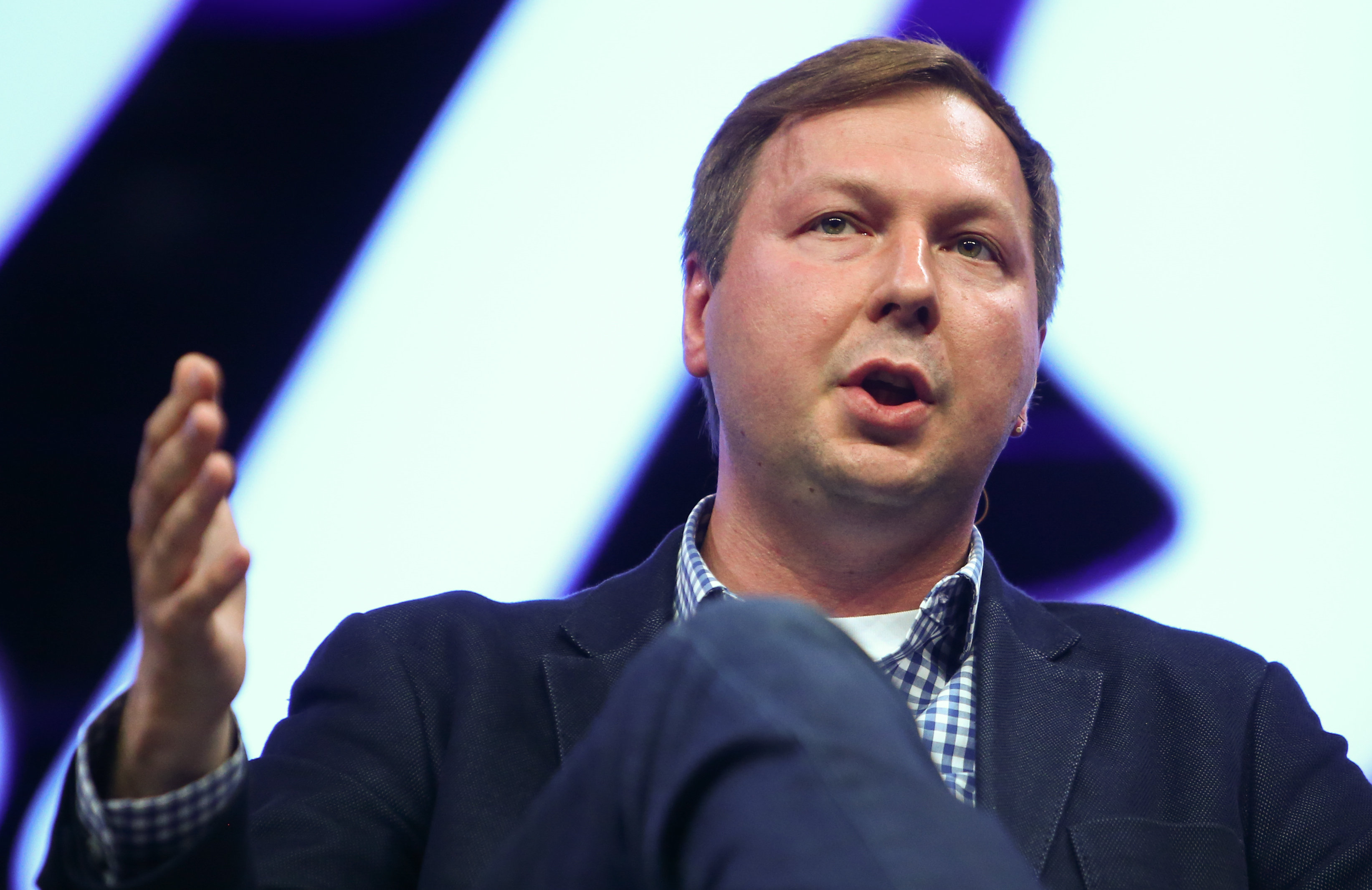
- Born: 15 October 1978 (age 47); Kapustin Yar, Russian SFSR, Soviet Union
- Occupations: Businessman, investor and Internet entrepreneur

Dmitry Sergeevich Grishin (Russian: Дмитрий Сергеевич Гришин; born 15 October 1978) is a businessman, investor and Internet entrepreneur. He is best known as the co-founder and former chairman and CEO of Mail.ru Group. Grishin also made significant contributions to Russia's internet presence, Runet, in its early days.

== Early life ==
Grishin was born in 1978 in Kapustin Yar, a Russian rocket launch and development site in Astrakhan Oblast. His father was a designer of radar systems for the MiG-29 jet fighter. At the age of 12, Grishin saw a VCR for the first time and the mechanics of the machine sparked his lifelong interest in robotics.

== Technology career and Mail.ru ==
While attending Bauman Moscow State Technical University, Grishin started working for the U.S. software company Axiom Int, overseeing programmers in Florida from his student hostel in Moscow. He worked as Design Engineer, Senior Software Developer, and IT consultant while with Axiom. In March 2000 he began to work for netBridge as head of the project development division of the online auction site Molotok.ru; a year later, he was promoted to CTO. After the dot-com bubble burst in the U.S., the company's funding disappeared, so netBridge and Port.ru — another struggling company that included the project Mail.ru — merged in 2001. By December 2001, he was the company's technical director. He became executive director in June 2002 and succeeded Yuri Milner as CEO in April 2003.

Under Grishin, Mail.ru expanded to become Russia's second largest web company by revenue. It provides a suite of consumer products including chat services, e-mail, and a social network, Odnoklassniki. In 2010, Mail.ru held the first large IPO by a Russian internet firm, raising $912 million. In addition to chat, email, social, and search services, Mail.ru earns revenue from games and ads. 90% of Russian internet users regularly use Mail.ru's services.

In November 2013, Grishin launched Mail.ru's U.S. subsidiary, My.com. My.com is based in the Netherlands with operations in California. Since launching, My.com has released a suite of mobile messaging, e-mail and gaming applications for iOS and Android devices and has announced upcoming MMORPG PC games.

In 2013, Grishin was named to MIT Technology Review's annual "35 Innovators Under 35" list. Outside of Mail.ru, he serves on the Board of Directors in Haslop Company Ltd. (Search for «Mamba» in the Internet) and Molotok Holdings Ltd. (Links on the Internet: "Molotok.ru"). Grishin resides in Moscow, and is married with one child. He speaks Russian, English and Chinese.

In October 2016, Grishin stepped down as CEO of Mail.ru, but remained as a Chairman until May 2022.

== Education ==
- 1995 - Graduated from physics and mathematics school No. 4, Saratov(Russia)
- 2001 - Finished MSTU with red diploma with a degree CAD

== Career ==
- 1998 - 2001 - Axiom Int. (United States, Florida, Clear Water)
- Since December 1998 - software engineer
- Since October, 1999 - senior software engineer
- From March 2000 to May 2001 - IT-consultant

netBridge Services (further Mail.Ru):

- From March 2000 - Head of project development Molotok.ru
- Since May, 2001 - Head Service Center
- Since December 2001 - Technical Director Mail.Ru
- Since June 2002 - Executive Director Mail.Ru
- From April 2003 - CEO Mail.Ru
- In 2005 - one of the founders of Mail.Ru Group
- In 2010 - CEO Mail.Ru Group
- In 2012 - Chairman of the Board of Directors Mail.Ru Group
- November 2013 - Launched U.S. subsidiary, My.com
- June 2012 - Founded Grishin Robotics
