= Udokan mine =

Copper mine in Russia

- Location in Transbaikalia
- Location: Udokan Range, Zabaykalsky Krai, Russia; 56°34′43″N 118°29′35″E
- Products: Copper

The Udokan mine is a large copper mine located in the south of Russia in Zabaykalsky Krai, around 30 km south of the town of Novaya Chara on the Baikal Amur Mainline.

The mine is part of the Udokan Ore Region that includes the Udokan, Kalar and Kodar ranges. The Udokan Ore Region represents the largest copper deposit in Russia and third largest in the world, having estimated reserves of 1.2 billion tonnes of ore grading 2% copper.

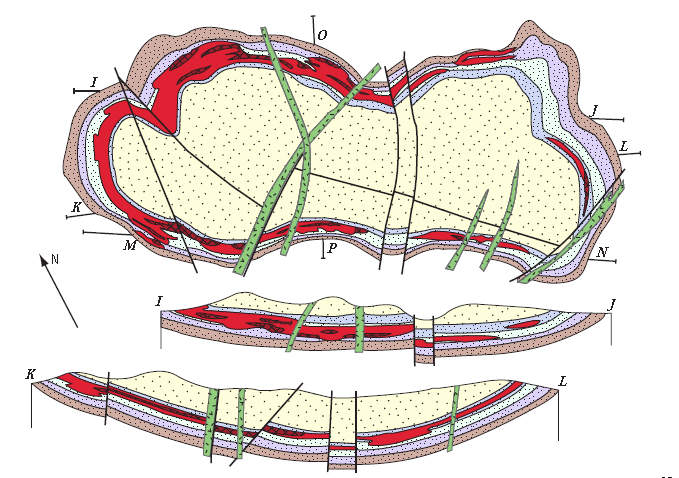
Udokan deposit geologic map and cross sections, where red denotes a bornite-chalcocite ore body, dark red denotes a pyrite-chalcopyrite ore body, green is a gabbro diabase, lamprophyre and quartz porphyry dike, and light tan is the Supraore sequence of the Upper Sakukan subformation and Naminga Formation.
