= Bitget =

Cryptocurrency exchange founded in 2018

- Type: Private
- Industry: Cryptocurrency
- Founded: 2018; 8 years ago
- Area served: Worldwide
- Key people: Gracy Chen (CEO)
- Products: Cryptocurrency exchange, cryptocurrencies
- Subsidiaries: Bitget Wallet
- Website: bitget.com

Bitget is a cryptocurrency exchange founded in 2018.

In September 2026, the exchange was hacked, with losses estimated at US$387.5 million.

== History ==
Bitget was founded in 2018. It initially specialized in cryptocurrency derivatives and copy trading.

In April 2023, Bitget raised US$10 million from venture capital firm, Dragonfly. Also, in April 2023, Bitget began testing the chatbot ChatGPT to answer customer inquiries, but ended the test after two weeks, saying that the tool had given users false information. In 2024, amid the growing popularity of Telegram-based games such as Hamster Kombat, Bitget and Foresight Ventures invested US$30 million in the TON ecosystem.

In 2024, Bitget appointed Gracy Chen as its chief executive. Later this year, Bitget obtained a bitcoin service provider license from the Central Reserve Bank of El Salvador.

In June 2026, it applied to Austria's Financial Market Authority for a license under the EU's Markets in Crypto-Assets regulation.

=== 2026 hack ===
On September 24, 2026, attackers stole cryptocurrency from Bitget's exchange wallet infrastructure. The losses were initially estimated at US$351.6 million and were later revised to US$387.5 million after additional transfers were identified.

The attackers compromised Bitget's wallet infrastructure and manipulated transaction data so that unauthorized withdrawals passed through the exchange's authorization process. Private keys and cold wallets were not compromised. Independent investigations by Mandiant and SlowMist subsequently found that the attackers had exploited zero-day vulnerabilities in third-party security products to gain access to Bitget's wallet environment. Blockchain analytics firm Elliptic assessed the attack as highly likely to be linked to North Korea, including the 2025 Bybit hack.

Bitget said that the financial impact of the breach would be covered by its User Protection Fund, which was launched in 2022 and expanded to US$300 million following the collapse of FTX; it was valued at more than US$464 million at the time of the attack. As the attackers attempted to move the stolen assets, cryptocurrency issuers Circle and Tether and the cross-chain service NEAR Intents froze approximately US$632 thousand linked to the stolen funds.

== Products ==
=== Bitget Wallet ===
Bitget Wallet, formerly known as BitKeep, is a cryptocurrency wallet of Bitget. In October 2022, BitKeep's swap feature was exploited, resulting in losses of about US$1 million. Following a separate December 2022 hack linked to a counterfeit version of its app, BitKeep promised to reimburse affected users in USDT, paying back in split schedule. Blockchain security firm PeckShield estimated total losses from the December incident at about US$8 million. In March 2023, Bitget acquired BitKeep, a non-custodial wallet, and renamed it as Bitget Wallet following a $30 million investment.

=== Bitget Token ===
Bitget Token (BGB) is a utility token associated with the Bitget ecosystem. In December 2024, Bitget merged the Bitget Wallet Token (BWB) into BGB, making BGB the common token of the exchange and wallet ecosystems.

== Sponsorships ==
In 2021, the company was first sleeve sponsor of the Italian football club Juventus.

In 2022, Bitget entered into a sponsorship deal with Lionel Messi after which he became a global brand ambassador of Bitget. Bitget's partnership with Messi had ended by December 2025.

In 2024, LaLiga announced a multi-year regional agreement with Bitget.

== Legal status ==
The exchange has faced regulatory warnings or restrictions in several jurisdictions, including Australia, Indonesia, and the Philippines.

=== France ===
The Autorité des marchés financiers (AMF) placed Bitget on its blacklist in 2023 for non-compliance with French regulations. Bitget withdrew its services from France in March 2026, describing the move as part of its efforts to comply with French regulatory requirements and following discussions with the AMF. Remaining assets were subsequently scheduled to be transferred to a licensed crypto-asset service provider. On July 9, 2026, the AMF removed bitget.com from its crypto asset blacklist.

=== Hong Kong ===
In 2023, BitgetX withdrew from Hong Kong after deciding not to seek a local virtual-asset trading licence. BGX, which shared a chief executive with BitgetX but denied being affiliated with Bitget, subsequently acquired a substantial stake in the parent company of the licensed exchange OSL.

=== Japan ===
Japan's Financial Services Agency (FSA) warned Bitget Limited in 2023 and 2024 for conducting crypto asset exchange business with Japanese residents without registration. In February 2025, upon the agency's request, Apple removed the apps of Bitget from its Japanese App Store. Later in 2025, the FSA also added BTG Technology Holdings Limited, which provides the Bitget service, to its list of unregistered operators that had been sent warning letters, for soliciting over-the-counter derivatives trading over the internet.

=== Singapore ===
In 2021, Singapore's financial regulator suspended Bitget's operations in the country over allegations of misleading promotion of the token named after the BTS fanbase. BTS's management company Hybe threatened legal action over its promotion. Bitget subsequently announced that it would delist ''ARMY'', while allowing withdrawals for a limited period.

=== Turkey ===
Bitget entered the Turkish market through its local subsidiary Bitget Teknoloji in 2023. In 2024, the subsidiary entered liquidation and Bitget withdrew its local operations; its shares were subsequently acquired by METX Dijital, the owner of the CoinTR exchange.

=== United Kingdom ===
In 2024, Bitget ceased serving users in the United Kingdom (UK) in response to the Financial Conduct Authority's (FCA) ban on retail cryptocurrency derivatives. Later this year, the exchange relaunched its UK website after obtaining approval for its financial promotions from Archax.
