= Hamster Kombat =

Telegram-based tap-to-earn game on TON

- Developers: Eduard Gurinovich, Nikita Anufriev, and Aleksandr Pasechnik
- Platform: Telegram (software) (mini app)
- Release: March 2024
- Genres: Incremental game (clicker), tap-to-earn
- Mode: Single-player

Hamster Kombat is a Telegram-based play-to-earn idle game. It uses The Open Network (TON) blockchain platform. The player takes the role of a CEO running a fictional crypto exchange and earns in-game currency through tapping and completing tasks.

== History ==
Prior to launch, the game's developers were anonymous. In June 2024, independent Russian news outlet The Bell reported that Eduard Gurinovich, Aleksandr Zelenshchikov, Aleksandr Pasechnik were involved in the project's creation.

In August 2024, Nikita Anufriev, whom Lenta.ru described as a project partner serving as its marketing director, announced that he had left Hamster Kombat amid a dispute over compensation. Anufriev alleged that Eduard Gurinovich had promised him 25% of the project's revenue, equity, or team token allocation in return for promoting the game and arranging partnerships, but that the agreement had not been fulfilled.

In September 2024, according to the Vedomosti, investors in Arenum company alleged that the game project had been developed using the company's personnel and technical resources and demanded a share of the game's profits. Gurinovich maintained that the game was separate from Arenum.

The $HMSTR cryptocurrency began trading on 26 September 2024 following the conclusion of the game's first season. The number of tokens allocated through airdrop to each player was determined by several measures of participation rather than by directly converting the in-game coins accumulated through tapping. The distribution disappointed many players, as the market value of typical allocations was substantially lower than some users had expected after several months of participation.

== Gameplay ==
Hamster Kombat is a clicker game played on mobile devices in which players accumulate in-game currency by tapping and completing in-app tasks. Progression includes upgrades that increase the rate at which in-game currency is acquired, and change the game's appearance.

The game purports that in-game currency will eventually be paid to users as a cryptocurrency. In a June 2024 email to reporters with the Associated Press, the game's developers claim that cryptocurrency was not directly available via the game itself. In July 2024, Kaspersky reported that cybercriminals had used the false promise of allowing users to convert in-game currency to cash to steal Telegram accounts from some Russian users. The game's cryptocurrency token, HMSTR, was listed for trading by Bybit in July 2024, OKX in September 2024, and Binance in December 2024.

== Users ==
The game has been popular among Telegram users, especially in Iran, Russia, Ukraine, and Uzbekistan. Government officials in all of these countries have advised against playing the game for various reasons. Russian government officials have described the game as a potential pyramid scheme. Uzbekistan, which tightly regulates cryptocurrency, has threatened to fine or imprison players who attempt to convert the game's cryptocurrency into cash. Ukraine's Centre for Strategic Communication and Information Security has cautioned that any personal information from players of the game could be passed to Russian military forces.

Coverage of the game frequently framed it as a viral “tap-to-earn” phenomenon linked to expectations of a token distribution. In June 2024, Iranian military officials and state-linked media criticized the app, and international outlets reported claims that it was part of a Western “soft war” narrative in Iran ahead of elections.

On 18 July 2024, Anatoly Aksakov, chair of the Russian State Duma's Committee on the Financial Market, proposed banning the game in Russia, stating that it manipulates gullible players hoping to make easy money.

== See also ==
- Telegram in Iran
