= Airdrop (disambiguation) =

Airdrop is an aerial re-supply tactic created during World War II.

Airdrop may also refer to:

- Airdrop (cryptocurrency), a procedure of distributing tokens
- AirDrop, an Apple service to wirelessly share files
- Airdrop Peak, a mountain in Antarctica
