= Blocking of Telegram in Russia =

Blocking access to Telegram in Russia

Map showing the countries that are either currently blocking or have blocked Telegram in the past: Currently blocked Formerly blocked

On April 16, 2018, the Russian government began blocking access to Telegram, an instant messaging service. The blocking led to interruptions in the operation of many third-party services, but practically did not affect the availability of Telegram in Russia. It was officially unblocked on June 19, 2020.

On February 10, 2026, Roskomnadzor officially confirmed that it had begun a new round of slowing down Telegram's service for users across the country, citing violations of Russian law. Russian media reported that authorities plan to completely block the messaging app in early April.

== Background ==
The Yarovaya law, which requires telecom operators to keep all voice and messaging traffic of their customers for half a year, and their internet traffic for 30 days, went into effect in the Russian Federation on July 1, 2018.

The position of Moscow's Meschansky district court is that, in accordance with the Yarovaya law, Telegram is required to store encryption keys from all user correspondence and provide them to Russia's Federal Security Service, the FSB, upon request. Telegram management insists that this requirement is technically impracticable, since keys of opt-in secret chats are stored on users' devices and are not in Telegram's possession. Pavel Durov, Telegram's co-founder, said that the FSB's demands violated the constitutional rights of Russian citizens to the privacy of correspondence.

On 13 April 2018 Moscow's Tagansky District Court ruled, with immediate effect, on restricting access to Telegram in Russia. Telegram's appeal to the Russian Supreme Court was rejected.

In April 2020, the Government of Russia started using the blocked Telegram platform to spread information related to the COVID-19 outbreak.

On 18 June 2020 Roskomnadzor lifted its ban on Telegram after it 'agrees to help with extremism investigations'. The court ruling which was the basis of original ban is still in force, and hence the lifting is illegal.

== Courts and legal position of the parties ==
Conflict between the FSB and Telegram began earlier than the Yarovaya law came into effect. In September 2017, the FSB filed a lawsuit on the non-fulfillment of the Yarovaya law by Telegram. In October 2017, a judgment was delivered in favor of the FSB, imposing a fine on Telegram of 800 thousand rubles. The reason cited was the lack of encryption keys for 6 persons accused of terrorism. According to a statement issued by one of the founders of Telegram, Pavel Durov, even if the request of the FSB was solely intended to help in capturing six terrorists, Telegram could not comply, as the mobile numbers that the FSB was concerned with either never had accounts in Telegram, or their accounts were deleted due to inactivity. At the same time, the FSB had demanded the creation of a technology that would enable them to access the correspondence of any users.

According to Pavel Durov, the FSB's requirements were not feasible:

In addition to the fact that the requirements of the FSB are not technically feasible, they contradict Article 23 of the Constitution of the Russian Federation : "Everyone has the right to privacy of correspondence, telephone conversations, postal, telegraphic and other communications".

If the FSB had confined itself to requesting information about several terrorists, its demand would fit in with the Constitution. However, we are talking about the transfer of universal encryption keys for the purpose of subsequent uncontrolled access to the correspondence of an unlimited circle of persons.

Pavel Durov put out a call on October 16, 2017, for lawyers who are willing to represent Telegram in a court to appeal the decision. Two days later Durov said that he received 200 proposals from lawyers, and chosen Inter-regional Association of Human Rights Organizations "Agora" to represent Telegram in the court battles.

Russia's Supreme Court rejected Telegram's lawsuit to FSB on March 20, 2018. After the court ruling, the Russian watchdog Roskomnadzor said the messaging service had 15 days to provide the required information to the country's security agencies. The FSB defended its position, saying that providing the FSB with the technical ability to decode messages does not annul legal procedures such as obtaining court rules in order to perlustrate specific messages.

On April 13, 2018, Moscow's Tagansky district court ruled to block access to Telegram in Russia over its failure to provide encryption keys to the FSB.

== Blocks ==
Enforcement of the ban was attempted by blocking over 19 million IP addresses associated with the service. However they included those used by Amazon Web Services and Google Cloud Platform, due to Telegram's use of the providers to route messages using domain fronting. This led to unintended collateral damage due to usage of the platforms by other services in the country, including retail, Mastercard SecureCode, and Mail.ru's Tamtam messaging service. Users used VPNs to bypass the ban as a result. While many unrelated web services (such as banking websites and mobile apps) that used content from the Google and Amazon clouds were blocked, the government did not succeed in blocking Telegram.

On 17 April 2018, Russian authorities asked Apple and Google to pull the service from their stores as well as APKMirror, however Apple and Google refused the request. On 28 March 2018, Roskomnadzor reportedly sent a legally binding letter to Apple asking it to remove the app from the Russian version of its App Store and block it from sending push notifications to local users who have already downloaded the app. On 27 December 2018, the largest search engine in Russia, Yandex, removed telegram.org from their search results. On 18 June 2020, the Russian government lifted its ban on Telegram after it agreed to "help with extremism investigations".

=== Blocking in 2026 ===
In August 2025, Roskomnadzor imposed the first restrictive measures by blocking voice messages and video calls on Telegram, ostensibly as a “measure to combat fraud”. And in February 2026, Roskomnadzor began limiting download speeds, which made it difficult for users to access media content such as voice notes, videos, and images.

Reports of widespread disruptions to the Telegram messaging app began circulating as early as mid-January 2026. At the time, several media outlets reported that the issue was linked to Roskomnadzor's actions against the app. However, the agency denied reports of a partial block. On February 10, Roskomnadzor officially confirmed that it had begun slowing down Telegram for users across the country, citing violations of Russian law[5][6]. The restrictions made it difficult for users to access media content such as voice messages, videos, and images. At the same time, it was reported that the authorities planned to completely restrict the messenger in early April. On March 14, according to user reports on outage tracking sites, there were nearly 6,000 complaints about the messenger's malfunctioning. The number of complaints increased over the weekend. Users report that the messenger is not working “at all”: the app won't open, messages won't send, and photos and videos won't upload. Reports of problems came from various regions of the country. On March 16, a Russian court fined the messaging app 35 million rubles for failing to remove prohibited content. On March 17, the CEO of TASS stated that the blocking of Telegram in Russia had entered its final stage.

== Protest actions ==
On April 22, 2018, "an action in support of free Internet" was held in multiple cities around Russia, timed to the seventh day of Telegram's being blocked. Residents of Russia launched paper airplanes (the symbol of Telegram) from the roofs of various buildings. The protest was planned on Telegram on the morning of April 22. Pavel Durov, one of the founders of Telegram, supported the action, but asked that the participants gather up the paper airplanes within an hour after the launch.

On April 30, 2018, in the center of Moscow, an action was held in support of Telegram in Russia as a result of its blocking. More than 12,000 people participated.

Protests on April 30, 2018

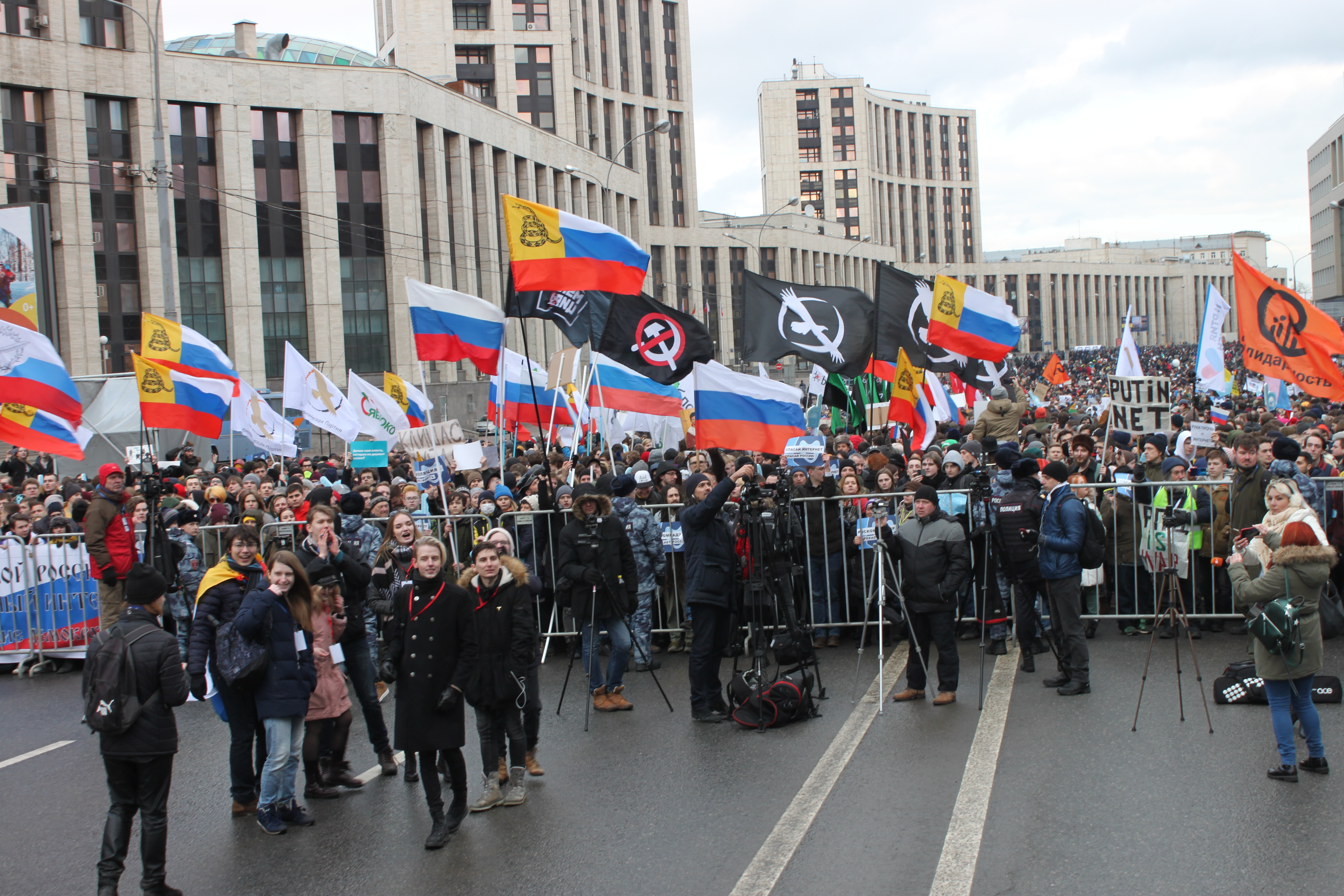

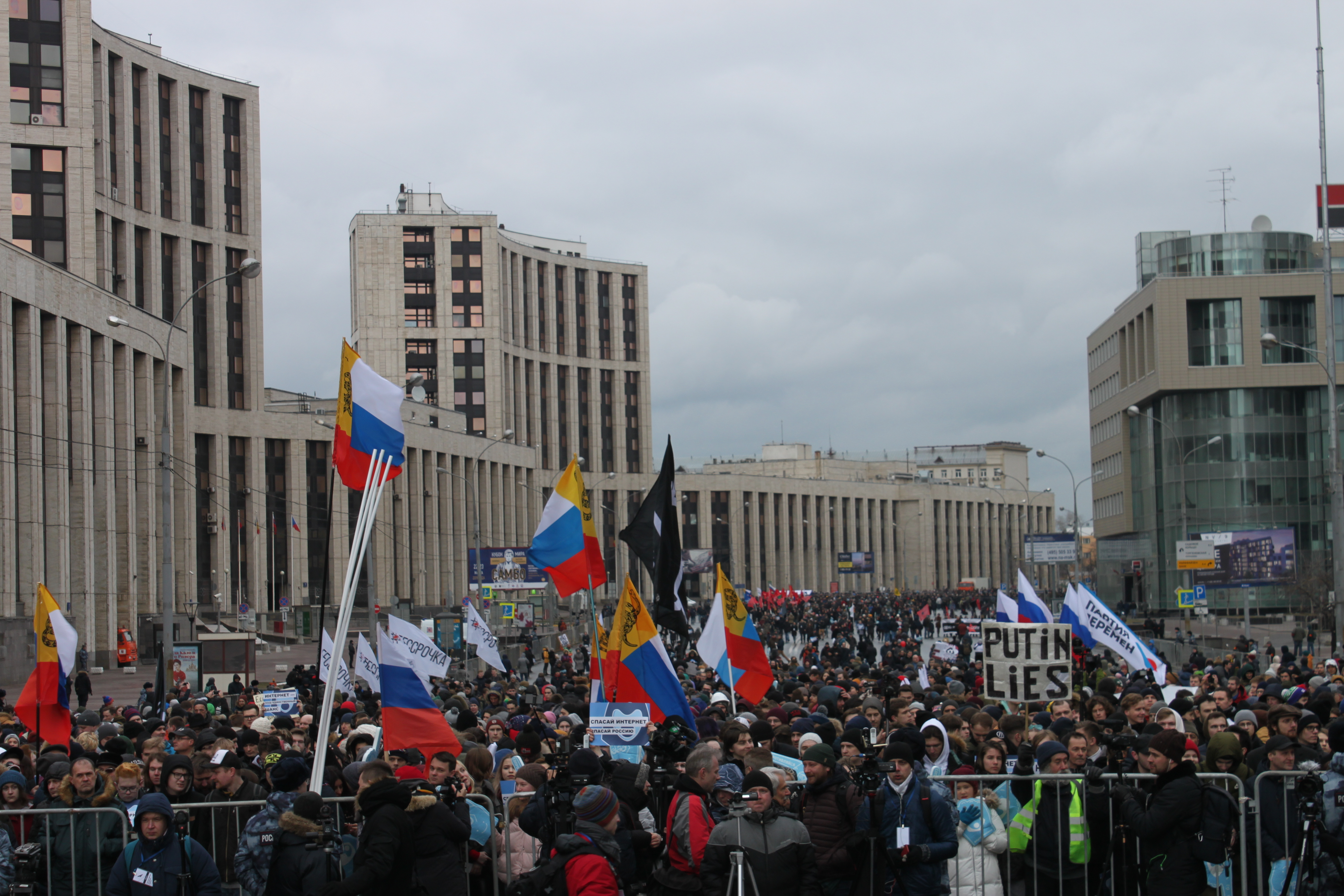

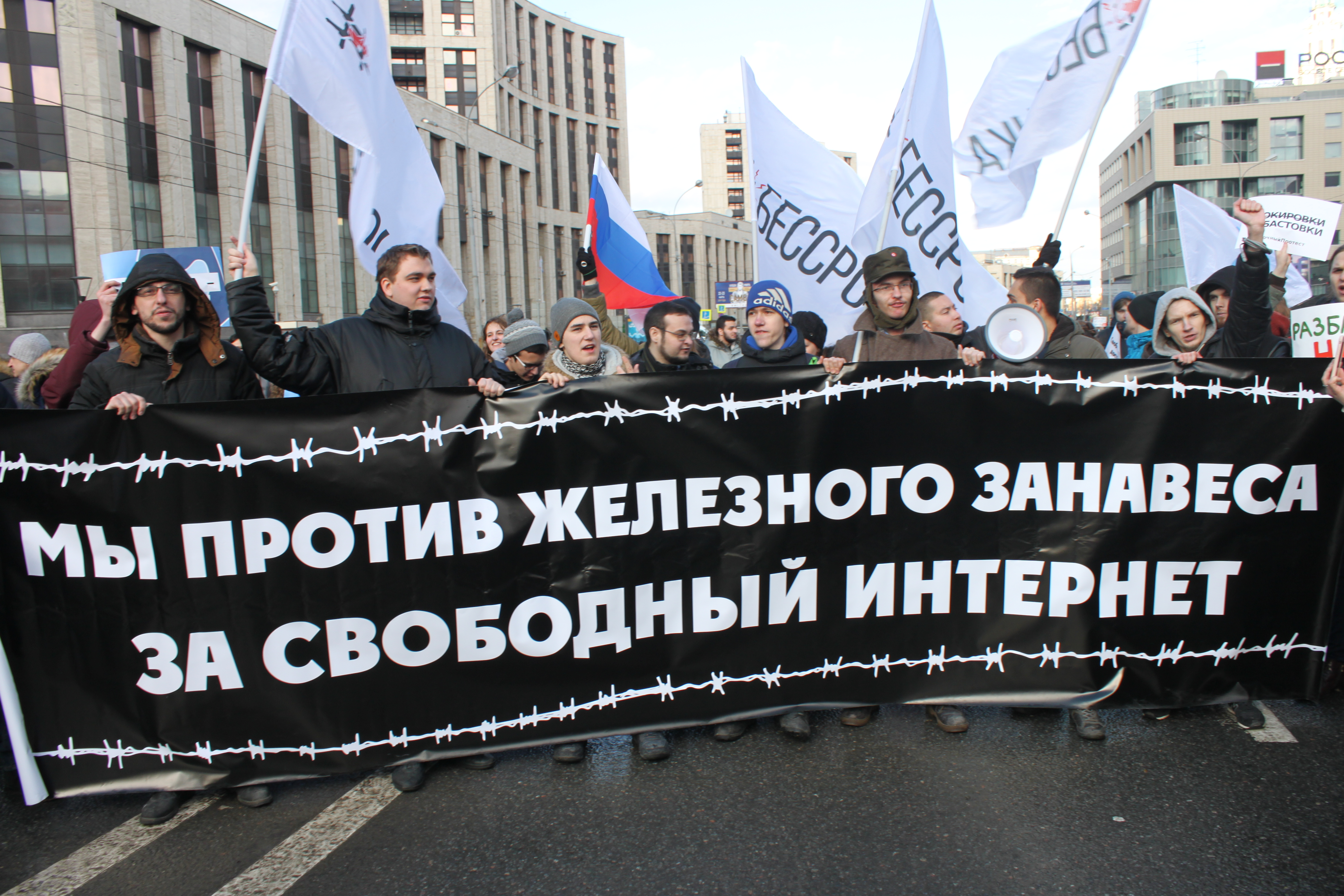

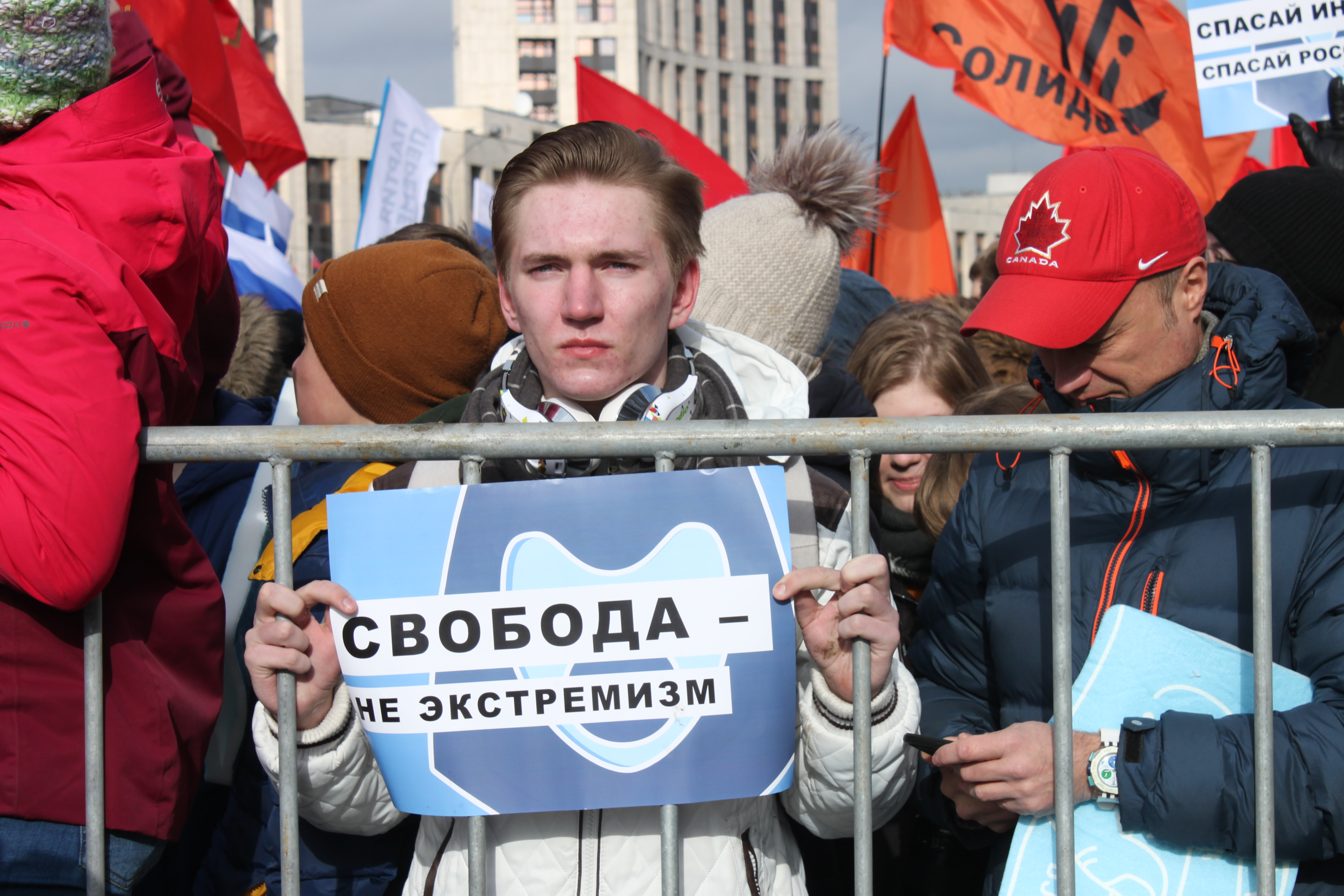

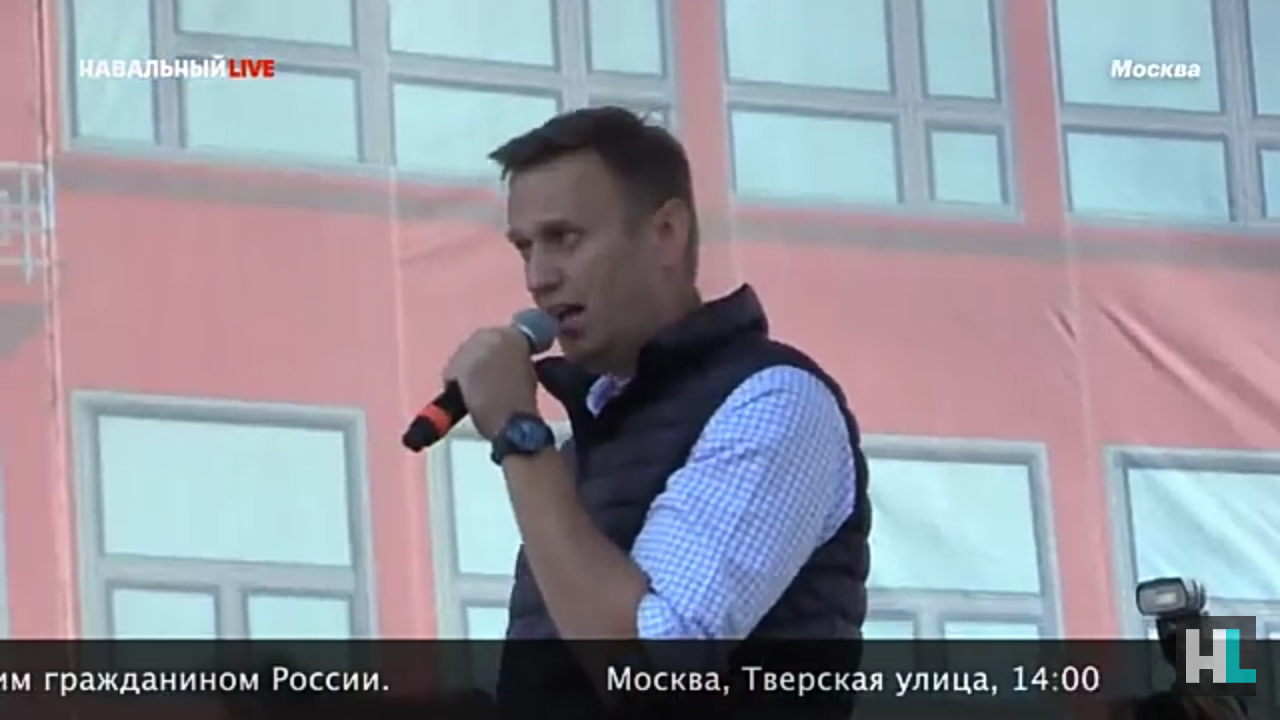

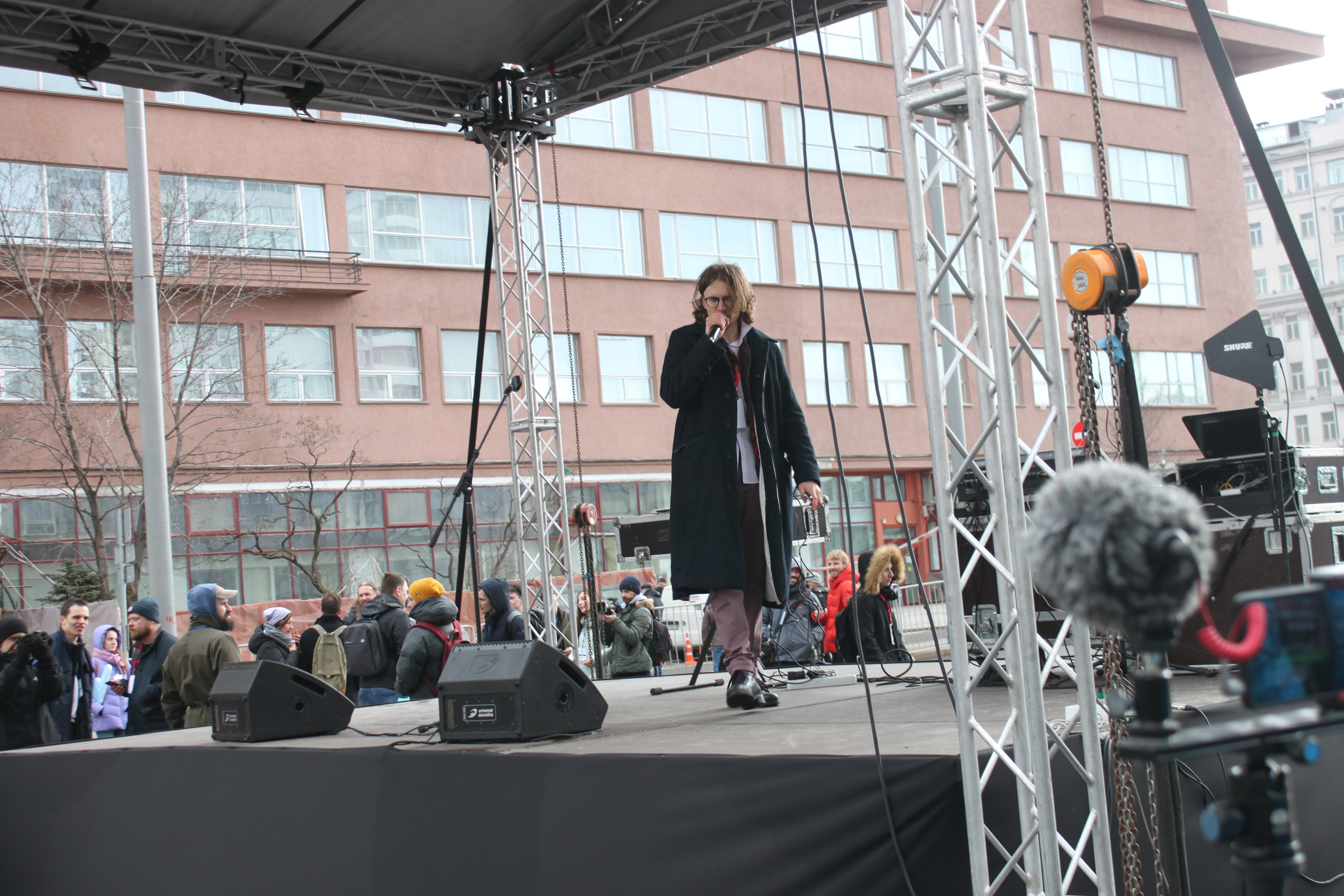

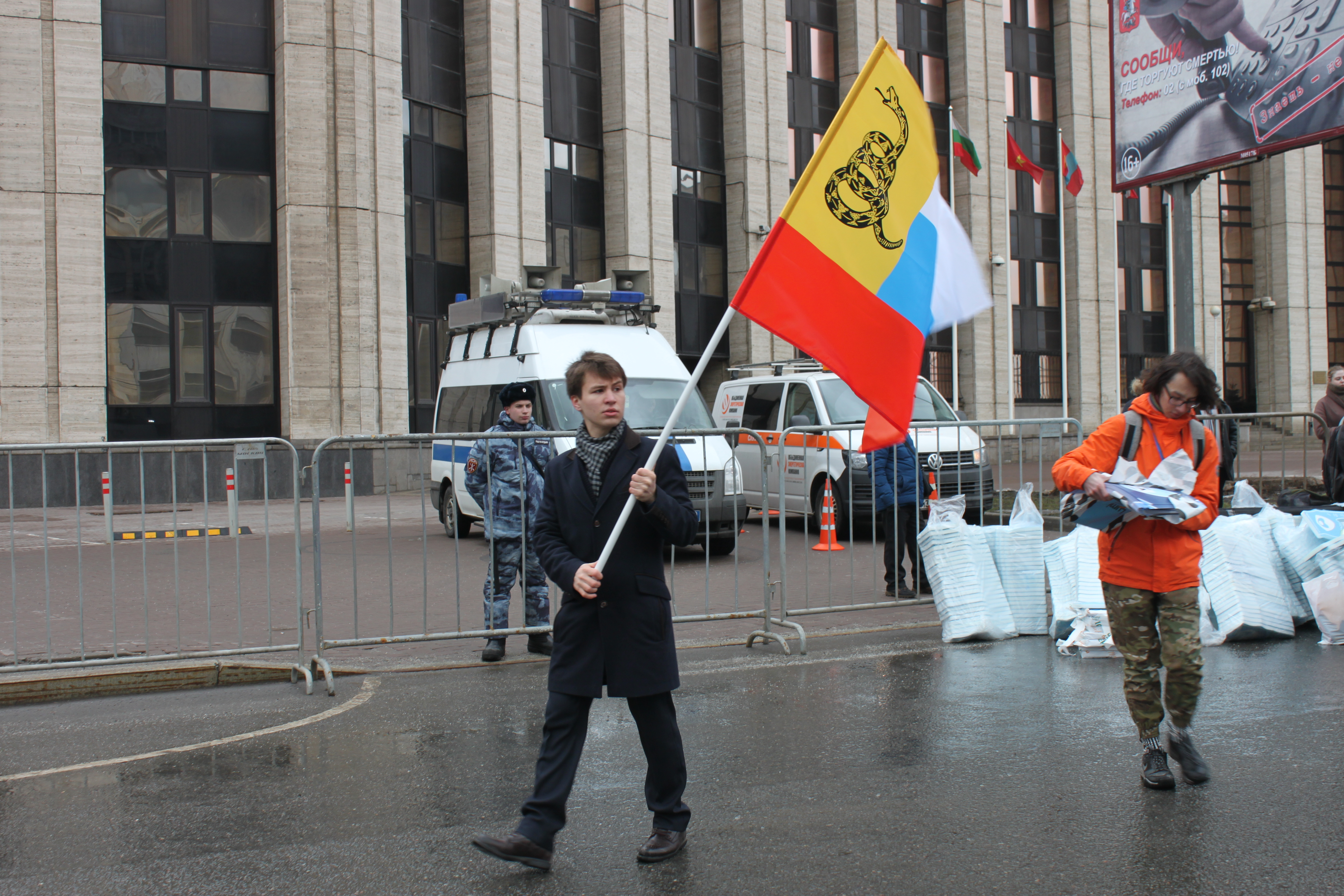

On 1 May 2018, about 1,000 people joined a march against the blocking of Telegram in Saint Petersburg. Organised by Open Russia, it formed part of the city's May Day demonstrations.

== See also ==
- Blocking of Wikipedia in Russia
- Internet censorship
- Telegram in Iran
