= Telegram in Iran =

Overview of the role of the instant messaging software Telegram in Iran

The Telegram instant messaging service has had more than 50 million users in Iran.

Following the disruptions caused by the Iranian government in the Viber and Line services, the Iranian people were attracted to Telegram. Security was the most important reason that led to its popularity. Additionally, this service permitted exchanging files up to 2 gigabytes.

The Iranian Government has repeatedly considered the topic of blocking access to Telegram and has always imposed limitations on users' access. During the protests on 8 December 2017, Telegram was blocked for more than a week and finally became available again on 23 December 2017. It was re-blocked on April 30, 2018, by judicial authorities. In the judicial order of the Tehran Prosecutor's Office, it was said that Telegram must be blocked by ISPs in such a way that it could not be achieved even with tools similar to VPNs.

The two-time experience of blocking Telegram in Iran shows that Iranian users did not migrate to alternative services, such as the foreign WhatsApp, or the domestic Soroush messenger, but resorted to Internet censorship circumvention.

== CDN ==
On April 27, 2018, Telecoms officials said that Telegram's license to site its CDN servers in Iran had been revoked, thereby it should move it servers outside the country.

== Spying request ==
On 20 October 2015, Pavel Durov, CEO of Telegram LLC said, after denying the request of Iranian authorities for private information about citizens of the country, Telegram was blocked for hours in Iran, but it was unblocked afterwards. Pavel Durov wrote an answer letter and announced that "Iranian authorities want to use Telegram to spy on their citizens. We cannot help them in this regard."

== Content moderation request ==
Telegram messenger played a major role in spreading the news about the protests and served as the primary platform to unify the protesters. On 30 December, the Iranian government requested the closing of a Telegram channel called "Amad News" (AMAD standing for Agaahi, awareness, Mobaareze, combat & Democracy) operated by Roohollah Zam which called for use of handmade explosives against the security forces. The request was accepted by Telegram since it also violated their terms of service and policies, and its CEO Pavel Durov received criticism for complying with the request. The channel was reinstated on the next day with a different title (Sedaye Mardom, lit. Voice of People) after the admin who published the post calling for violence was dismissed. On 31 December, the Iranian government blocked access to Telegram after it had refused to ban another channel. Telegram CEO Pavel Durov tweeted that "Iranian authorities are blocking access to Telegram for the majority of Iranians after our public refusal to shut down telegram.me/sedaiemardom and other peacefully protesting channels."

The government lifted restrictions on Telegram on 13 January 2018. but again applied permanent restrictions after late April 2018. Iranian government created another version of the app that works beside telegram called Talagram or Telegram Golden and one more clone called Hotgram with overhauled censorship and features.

== Blocking Telegram free voice calls feature ==
Only one day after Telegram introduced the voice call feature in the messenger, the voice call functionality was completely blocked in Iran. Paul Durov wrote in response to users who had asked about voice calls problems in Iran: "Internet service providers in Iran have blocked it again." The low cost of calling using this feature and the subsequent financial losses incurred by the telecommunication network operators, including the stated-owned Mobile Telecommunication Company of Iran, may have motivated the block, Although public relations of MTN Irancell announced that the operator has played no role in the disruption of the service. Mahmoud Vaezi Chief of Staff of the President of Iran said reason for blocking Telegram free voice calls is so Iranian corporations keep revenue from voice calls.

== Full blocking ==
Map of countries in which Telegram is completely blocked or partially Completely blocked Blocked partially (some ISPs or audio traffic)

Following the Iranian government policy to censor every social network and instant messaging service in Iran, they have continued to disrupt access to Telegram. On Saturday 16 May 2015, the telecommunication company of Iran blocked Telegram access in some parts of the Tehran province and some other provinces without prior notice.

These intermittent restrictions demonstrated the government's increasing control over online communications and internet censorship, often citing national security and public order as reasons. Despite these measures, Telegram remained popular, and many Iranians relied on VPNs and other circumvention tools to continue using the service.

Following the nationwide protests in Iran in 2017 and 2018, and to prevent rioting, the Supreme National Security Council of Iran decided to cut off all social networks, including Telegram, although it was said to be temporary. On the night of January 23, 2017, the block was lifted. However, Telegram was banned by the government on May 1, 2018, following street protests. For until one year from the end of the 2017 riots, the Iranian government made available a customized version of Telegram that was under their domain. Now that Telegram has been banned, Instagram has now become the country's primary social media platform. Before the ban, about 80 million people (most of the country's population) used Telegram, although many users still skirt around the government's restrictions by using a Virtual Private Network (VPN).

For up to one year after the end of the 2017 riots, the Iranian government made available a customized version of Telegram that was under their domain. Now that Telegram has been banned, Instagram has become the country's primary social media platform. Before the ban, about 80 million people (most of the country's population) used Telegram, although many users still skirt around the government's restrictions by using a Virtual Private Network (VPN).

== See also ==
- TikTok in Iran
- Internet censorship in Iran
- Internet censorship
- Blocking of Telegram in Russia
