= OSL Group =

Hong Kong-based publicly listed company

- Formerly: BC Technology Group
- Type: Public
- Traded as: SEHK: 863
- Founded: 2003; 23 years ago
- Headquarters: Hong Kong
- Key people: Kevin Cui (CEO)
- Website: group.osl.com

OSL Group is a Hong Kong-based publicly listed company providing services in brokerage, digital assets exchange, over-the-counter trading, and custody of digital assets.

== History ==
OSL Group was founded as BC Technology Group in 2003 by Bin Fang. Since its founding, OSL has received investments from various investors, including Fidelity.

In 2013, OSL was listed on the GEM Board of the Hong Kong Stock Exchange. Two years later, in 2015, it was moved to the main board of the Hong Kong Stock Exchange.

In 2018, OSL expanded its services to include digital assets. On 15 December 2020, OSL became the first asset trading platform licensed by the Securities and Futures Commission of Hong Kong. Subsequently, it hired one of the Big Four accounting firm as its auditor.

In January 2023, Hugh Madden was named as the chief executive officer (CEO) of the company.

In August 2023, OSL and HashKey became the first two companies to receive approval from the Securities and Futures Commission of Hong Kong to operate cryptocurrency exchanges for retail investors.

In November 2023, BGX acquired a 30 percent stake in OSL Group.

== Operations ==
OSL provides services in brokerage, digital asset exchange, over-the-counter (OTC) trading, and digital asset custody. Its brokerage services include OTC and Request for Quote (RFQ) transactions, while the exchange services offer a platform for trading digital assets. In the area of custody, OSL also acts as a sub-custodian for Hong Kong spot Crypto ETFs. Additionally, through Omnibus, OSL is working with Interactive Broker and Victory Securities.

== See also ==
- Bitget
