= Archax =

UK digital asset exchange, founded 2018

- Company type: Private
- Founded: 2018; 8 years ago
- Founder: Graham Rodford, Andrew Flatt, and Matthew Pollard
- Headquarters: London, England
- Website: archax.com

Archax, based in London, is the UK's first FCA-regulated digital asset exchange, brokerage, and custodian, and was also the first entry on the FCA's Cryptoasset Register.

== History ==
Archax was founded by Graham Rodford, Andrew Flatt, and Matthew Pollard in London, in April 2018. In August of the same year, the company partnered with Custom House Global Fund Services (now part of Apex) to enhance its anti–money laundering measures to attract City firms to the digital currency market.

In August 2020, Archax announced becoming the first FCA-regulated digital securities exchange, broker and custodian in the UK.

According to Bloomberg, Archax had asked the UK Financial Conduct Authority to regulate it. In October, Archax closed its seed raise with a total funding of $8 million.

In August 2022, Abrdn bought a stake in the digital assets exchange Archax. In November 2022, Archax completed its Series A funding round, raising $28.5 million.

In June 2023, Archax launched prototypes of digital versions of FTSE100 shares and UK government bonds on the blockchain.

In February 2024, Archax introduced its Stablecoin Yield Service, enabling stablecoin holders to transform their assets into yield-generating options. The service includes access to regulated Money Market Funds (MMFs), which are offered in both traditional and tokenized formats.
