= TikTok in Iran =

Relationship between TikTok and Iran

TikTok in Iran, despite being heavily restricted due to domestic policies (Internet censorship) and international sanctions, holds significant cultural, social, and political importance. Following the lifting of restrictions on Iranian user registration in 2023, Iranians were able to access the platform using VPNs. TikTok has gained a substantial following among Iranian users, particularly teenagers, due to its entertainment value and viral dance challenge videos.

Given the prohibition of dancing by the Islamic Republic, some TikTok posts by Iranian users have had a notable political impact. In 2023, for instance, a video released to mark International Women's Day featured five Iranian girls wearing crop tops and loose pants, with their hair uncovered, performing a popular TikTok dance to the song "Calm Down." According to Iran International, the video was shared on TikTok and Instagram by their dance instructor and quickly became a symbol of resistance against the country's hardline Islamist regime and its suppression of protesters in the digital space. The government's response to these girls and the related crackdown drew criticism from prominent domestic and international political and social figures, making the incident a trending topic on Persian-language social media for a time. Numerous foreign media outlets covered the story, and the girls received widespread global support.

== History ==
=== Early Period ===
TikTok gained significant popularity among Iranian users, particularly teenagers, due to its entertaining content and diverse dance and other challenge videos. However, on October 13, 2019, TikTok unilaterally blocked access for Iranian users, and the platform was subsequently blocked by the Committee for Determining Instances of Criminal Content.

Following October 2019, Iranian users resorted to modified versions of the app to access TikTok. Additionally, TikTok’s Chinese version, Douyin, was available in Iran but only in the Chinese language. On October 13, 2019, TikTok completely cut off access for users inside Iran, and in the years that followed, due to blocked by the Committee for Determining Instances of Criminal Content, the platform saw limited growth in its Persian-language sections. However, starting in September 2023, access to TikTok was restored for Iranian users, external sanctions against them were lifted, and Iranians were able to register and use the global version of the app only with VPN on. During this period, some videos were shared on TikTok to raise awareness about the situation inside Iran during anti-government protests.

=== Potential Benefits for the Iranian Government ===
In July 2023, the Tehran Chamber of Commerce announced that “experts from Douyin’s business service provider, one of China’s leading e-commerce companies, will visit Iran.” Hessamoddin Hallaj, Deputy for International Affairs at the Tehran Chamber of Commerce, stated: “This commercial company produces video content for various products and, using artificial intelligence data, identifies the preferences of Chinese customers, assisting Iranian companies in marketing and selling products through popular platforms in China, including Douyin (TikTok).”

Chen Kefeng, the director of Anext, also announced the establishment of a specialized office within the Anext group for Iran, named Eureka, which would be responsible for operations related to Iran. In this context, some media outlets affiliated with the Iranian government used headlines such as “TikTok executives travel to Iran today to expand cooperation / Producing independent content against Western influence” and welcomed the development. The Iranian Minister of Communications responded to TikTok’s presence in Iran by stating, “There is no issue with the operation of platforms that comply with our regulations.”

== Content ==
Many Gen Z female TikTok users in Iran frequently participated in international dance challenges, often replicating global trends. However, some incorporated traditional Iranian folk dances into various challenges, blending local and global cultural elements. By 2024, techno and Persian pop music by artists such as Arash and Sahar, alongside international artists like Selena Gomez and Kim Petras, were likely among the most popular on TikTok in Iran. Songs by Selena Gomez and Kim Petras were particularly favored for dance challenges, while Persian-language songs were used in a wider variety of content. Although no database exists to confirm the geographic distribution of Iranian TikTok users, it appears that modern dance styles, such as twerking, or dances potentially deemed provocative by the Iranian government, are more commonly performed by Iranian users residing outside the country rather than those within Iran.

== See also ==
- Internet censorship in Iran
