= Airdrop (cryptocurrency) =

Unsolicited token or coin distribution

An airdrop is an unsolicited distribution of a cryptocurrency token or coin, usually for free, to numerous wallet addresses. Airdrops are associated with the launch of a new cryptocurrency or a DeFi protocol, as a way of gaining attention and new followers.

Airdrops aim to take advantage of the network effect by engaging existing holders of a particular blockchain-based currency, such as Bitcoin or Ethereum, in their currency or project.

In the United States, the practice has raised policy issues about tax liability and whether they amount to income or capital gains.

== See also ==
- Helicopter money
